= M4 (Cape Town) =

Metropolitan route in the City of Cape Town, South Africa

Metropolitan route M4
- The M4 highlighted in red

Route information
- Maintained by City of Cape Town and Western Cape Department of Transport and Public Works
- Length: 47.7 km (29.6 mi)

Major junctions
- North end: M59 in Zonnebloem

- M60 in Zonnebloem M163 in Observatory; N2 in Mowbray; M18 in Mowbray M89 in Rondebosch M92 in Rondebosch M63 in Newlands M33 in Newlands; M24 in Claremont M9 / M152 in Kenilworth; M41 in Wynberg M160 in Plumstead M38 in Diep River M39 in Bergvliet; M40 in Kirstenhof M42 in Kirstenhof M75 in Lakeside; R310 in Muizenberg M75 in Kalk Bay M65 in Fish Hoek; M6 in Gencairn M66 near Simon's Town

- South end: M65 near the Cape of Good Hope

Location
- Country: South Africa

Highway system
- Numbered routes of South Africa
← M3	→ M5

The M4 is a long metropolitan route in the City of Cape Town Metropolitan Municipality in South Africa. It connects the Cape Town CBD with the Cape of Good Hope via Wynberg, Muizenberg, Fish Hoek and Simon's Town. Originally, it was the main route connecting the Cape Town CBD with the Southern Suburbs and is thus named Main Road for much of its length. From the CBD to Kirstenhof, it is parallel to the M3 Freeway.

== Route ==
The M4 begins at a junction with the M59 route (Buitenkant Street) in District Six (Zonnebloem; east of the Cape Town City Centre), just north of the District Six Museum and just east of the Cape Town City Hall. It begins by heading eastwards as Sir Lowry Road to fly over the N2 highway (Nelson Mandela Boulevard) and enter the Woodstock suburb. In Woodstock, it slowly turns towards the south and reaches the Cape Town Science Centre and Groote Schuur Hospital in Observatory, where it once again flies over the N2 highway (Settlers Way).

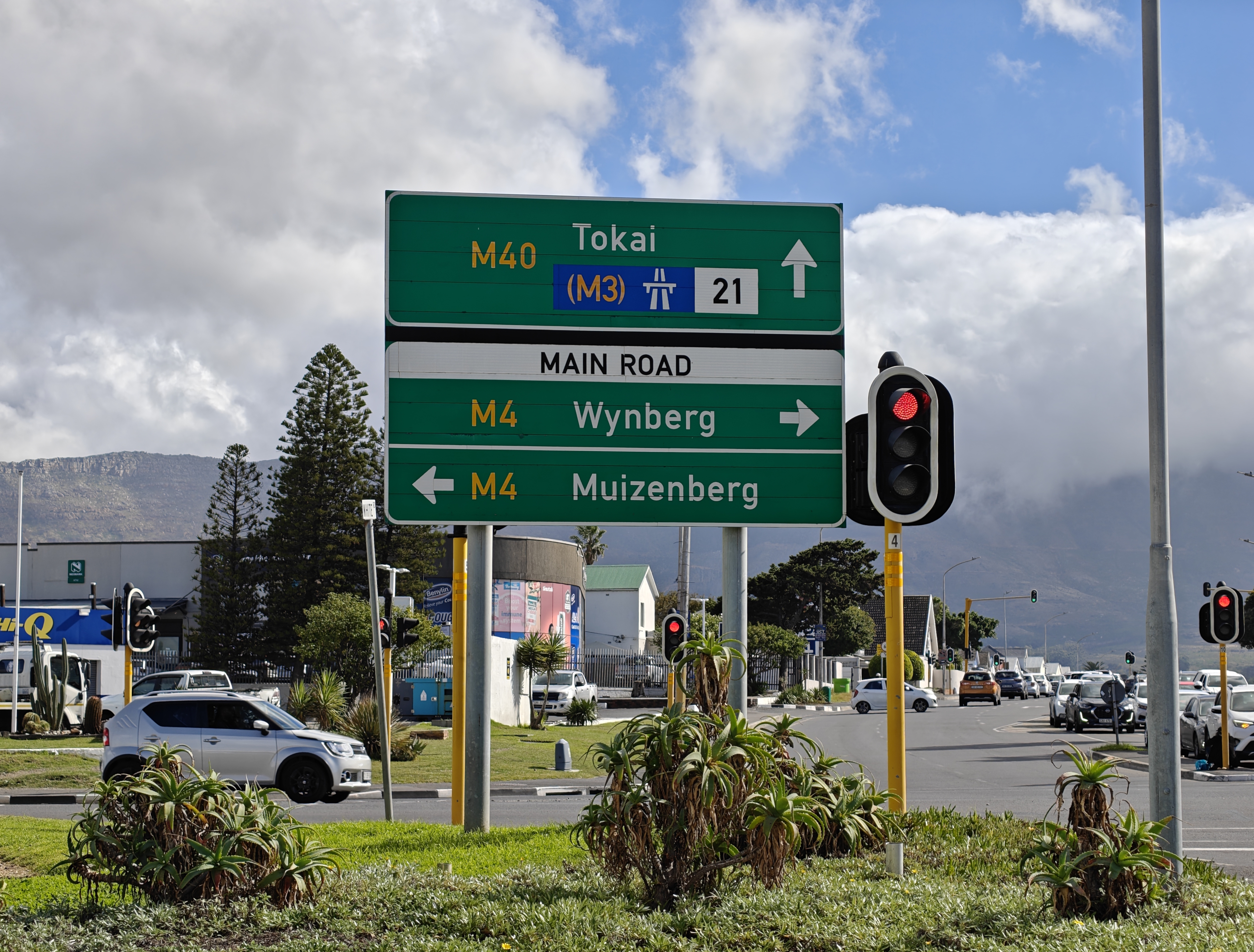
Road sign at the M4 and M40 junction in Dreyersdal, Southern Suburbs.

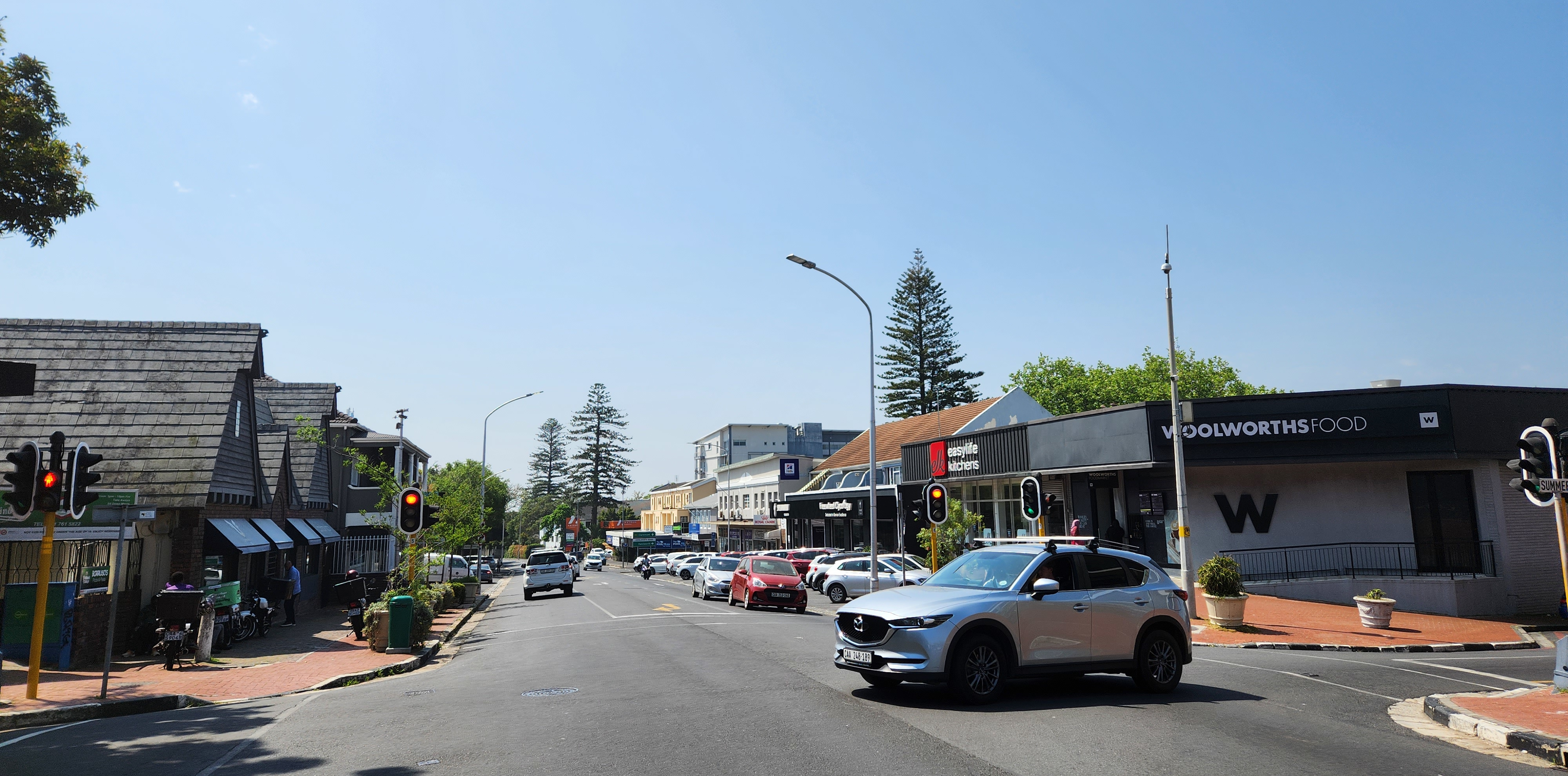
A view down Main Road (M4) as it runs through the suburb of Kenilworth.

It continues southwards as Main Road from the N2 overbridge for 18 kilometres, through Mowbray, Rosebank, Rondebosch, Newlands, Claremont, Kenilworth, Wynberg, Plumstead, Diep River, Bergvliet, Heathfield, Dreyersdal, Retreat and Kirstenhof, to bypass the Muizenberg Mountains and enter Muizenberg, where it meets the south-western terminus of the R310 route (Baden Powell Drive). The M4 continues southwards with the False Bay coast to its east for 6 kilometres (still named Main Road) to reach Fish Hoek, where it meets the M65 route at a roundabout.

The M4 continues following the coast southwards to reach Glencairn, where it meets the southern terminus of the M6 route (an alternative route from the Cape Town CBD). The M4 proceeds southwards for 18 kilometres, through Simon's Town, to reach its end at another junction with the M65 route in the Cape Peninsula, at the entrance of the Cape of Good Hope.
