= Dennendal =

Suburb of Cape Town, South Africa

- Suburb
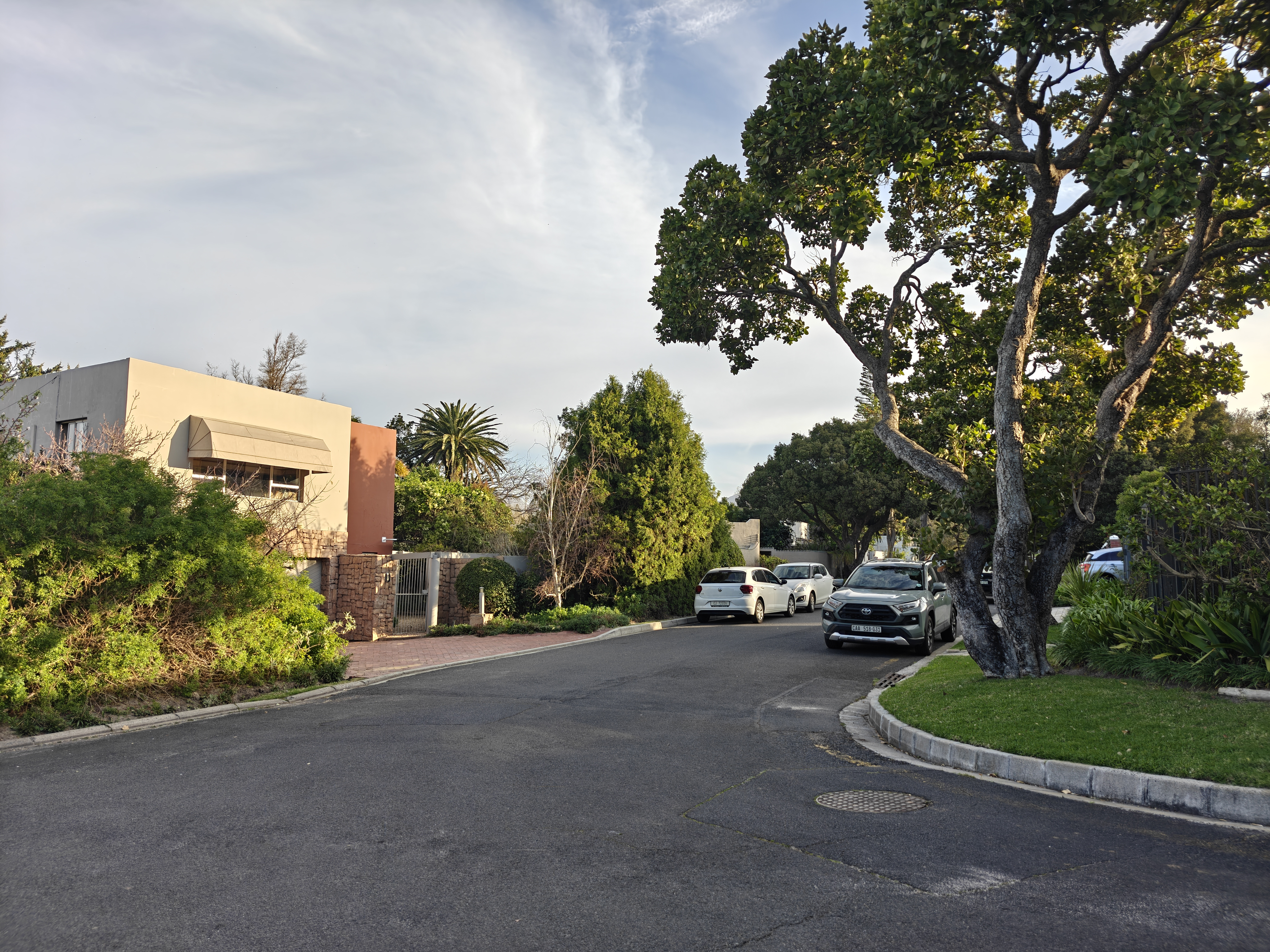
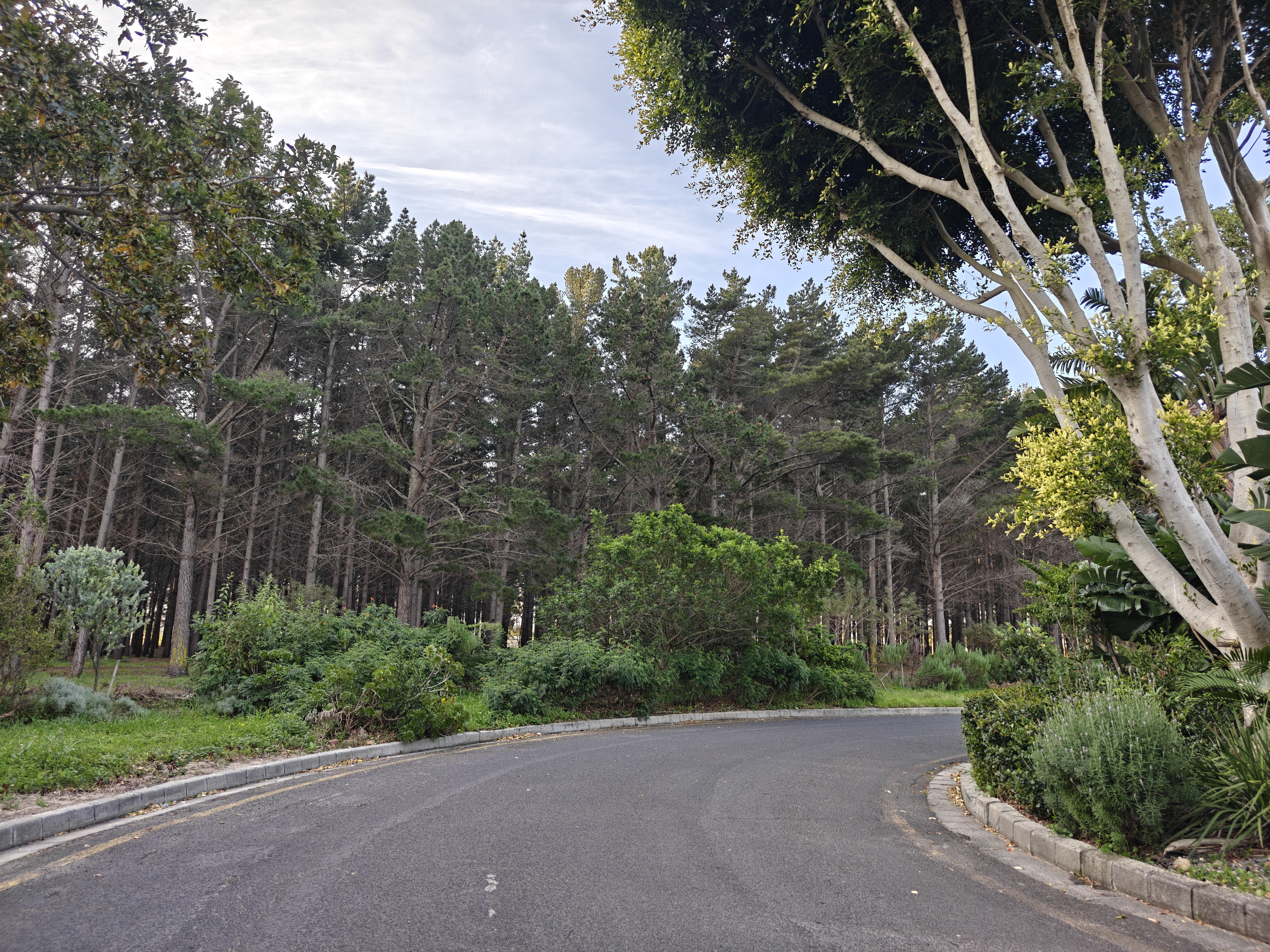
- Interactive map of Dennendal
- Coordinates: 34°3′22.878″S 18°26′6.933″E
- Country: South Africa
- Province: Western Cape
- Municipality: City of Cape Town
- Main place: Cape Town

Government
  - Councilor: Carolynne Franklin (Democratic Alliance)

Area
  - Total: 0.59 km^{2} (0.23 sq mi)
- Elevation: 27.8 m (91 ft)

Population (2011)
  - Total: 878
  - Density: 1,500/km^{2} (3,900/sq mi)
- Time zone: UTC+2 (SAST)
- Postal code: 7945
- Area code: 021

Dennendal is a small, affluent, leafy suburb of Cape Town, South Africa. It is entirely residential, and situated in the city's Southern Suburbs region.

== Geography ==
Dennendal is bordered by Dreyersdal to the east, Tokai to the south (separated by the Klein Bergvliet river), and Tokai Forest to the west and north.

== Housing ==
Dennendal comprises only detached homes, situated on large plots. 2011 census data published by the City of Cape Town combined three suburbs, including Dennendal, into one broader Tokai area. That data showed that just over 85% of the area's homes were owned, while only around 11% were rented.

As of August 2026, the average price of a detached home in the suburb is around R9.2 million, placing it firmly within Cape Town's luxury housing market.

== Transit ==
The suburb is close to the M3, one of Cape Town's two major metropolitan freeways. The M3 runs along the eastern side of the suburb, creating its border with Dreyersdal. The M40 runs below Tokai, which is south of Dennendal, and connects the suburbs to the M4 (Main Road) to the east.

== Education ==
Nearby schools include Sweet Valley Primary, Bergvliet Primary, Kirstenhof Primary, Bergvliet High, Reddam House Constantia, and the American International School of Cape Town.

== Demographics ==
According to 2011 census data, there were 878 residents living across 318 households in Dreyersdal. The average household size was therefore 2.76.

That same data showed that Dennendal residents are 52% female and 48% male. The largest age category for residents is 50 through 54, followed by 40 through 44. A total of 94% of Dreyersdal residents speak English as their first language, followed by Afrikaans at 4%.

== Commerce ==
The suburb is entirely residential, and the closest commercial sites are in nearby Tokai and Constantia. These include Westlake Village, Blue Route Mall, and Constantia Emporium.

== Governance ==
Dennendal is part of Ward 71 in the City of Cape Town metro, which is represented by Councilor Carolynne Franklin of the Democratic Alliance.
