= Dutch Reformed Church, Rondebosch =

Church in Rondebosch, Cape Town, South Africa

Coordinates: 33°54′30″S 18°23′45″E

Dutch Reformed Church
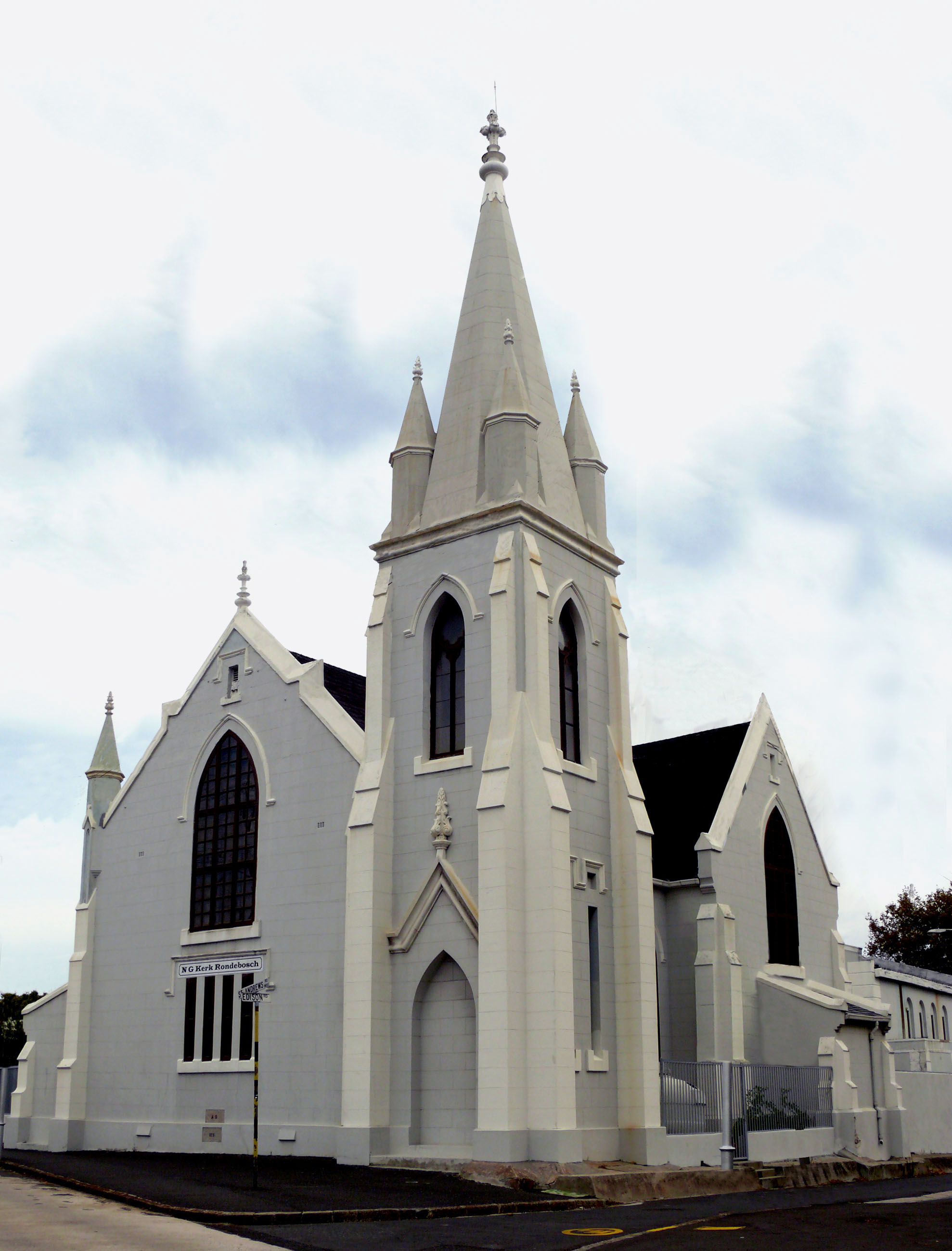
- Dutch Reformed Church
- Location: Cape Town
- Country: South Africa
- Denomination: Nederduits Gereformeerde Kerk

History
- Founded: 1891

Architecture
- Functional status: Church

The Dutch Reformed Church in Rondebosch is a historically important congregation of the Dutch Reformed Church in the eponymous, southern suburb of Cape Town. The congregation boundaries, after the incorporation of part of Die Vlakte in 1989 and of the whole of Keurboom in December 1990, encompass Rondebosch's only two daughter congregations, the suburbs of Rondebosch, Newlands, Rosebank, Claremont, Mowbray and Rondebosch East – a huge area for a suburban congregation.

Rondebosch began in 1891 as a very small and mainly English-speaking congregation, but over the years the membership increased sharply as more and more Afrikaans speakers came to live in the Southern Suburbs. The membership peaked at around 1,700 around 1965 and then, despite the incorporation of both daughter congregations, decreased more than sevenfold until 2015.

Many reasons can be given for this decline. The southern suburbs have always been a non-Afrikaans environment in which Afrikaans speakers have always been a small minority. People who want to live in an Afrikaans environment among Afrikaans speakers will therefore prefer to settle in the northern suburbs. Rondebosch and the surrounding area are also a sought-after residential area with expensive property, which makes it difficult for young families to settle here. This has led to the Anglicization of the two Afrikaans and one bilingual school within the municipality boundaries, which serves as an additional deterrent to younger members who would like to have their children educated in Afrikaans. Also, the small but important source of income from the Groote Schuur estate, where cabinet ministers live, was lost to Rondebosch around 1994 when the composition of parliament changed drastically.

== Ministers ==
- B.P.J. Marchand, 1891–1906 (the father of the labor colony on Kakamas)
- Lourens Matthys Kriel, 1907–1909
- Hercules Enslin du Plessis, 1911 – 26 March 1921 (retired)
- Pieter Gerhardus Jacobus Meiring, 1922–1938 (also editor of the Kerkbode)
- Arnold Meiring, 1932–1938 (son of the above and in 1957 and 1961 moderator of the Transvaal Church)
- Pieter de Vos Grobbelaar, 1938–1941
- Petrus Swart, 1939 (assistant preacher, first pastor of Die Vlakte after secession)
- Willem Stephanus Conradie, 1941–1948
- Adriaan (Attie) Jacobus van Wijk, 1949–1958 (father of the author and retired head of the Nehemia and Huguenot Bible Institute in Wellington with the same name)
- Daniel Johannes Rabie, 1958–1964
- Gysbert Du Toit Muller, 1958 – 7 August 1965
- Prof. Johan Heyns, 1964–1966
- Willem Petrus de Vos, 11 December 1965–1968 (first pastor of NG congregation Keurboom after secession; died on 23 March 2019)
- Kenney O'Kennedy, 7 May 1966–1974
- Prof. Hermanus Adriaan Lombard, 1969–1973
- Dr. Jacobus Adriaan Vorster, 1971–1976 (with assignment of training believers for dialogue with the Jews)
- Marthinus Johannes Jacobus Prinsloo, 1975–1982
- Andries Kinder Batt, 1976
- Dr. Ernst Jacobus van der Walt, 1982 – 2 March 2008
- Pieter Gabriel Thirion, 1989–1993 (chaplain SAP)
- Johannes Petrus Theron, 1990–1995 (last pastor of Keurboom Reformed Church)
- Jan van Schoor Momsen, 2008 – 30 July 2017
- Dr. Johan van den Heever, 4 February 2018 – present

== Sources ==
- (in Afrikaans) Olivier, ds. P.L. (samesteller). 1952. Ons gemeentelike feesalbum. Kaapstad en Pretoria: N.G. Kerk-uitgewers, 1952.
- (in Afrikaans) Symington, Johan (et al.). 1973, 1979, 1990, 1999, 2004, 2007, 2008, 2014. Jaarboek van die NG Kerke, Tydskriftemaatskappy, Kaapstad en Wellington, .
- (in Dutch) Dreyer, eerw. A. 1929. Kerksouvenir van Wynberg, Gemeente-Eeuwfeest 1829–1929, Kaapstad, Stellenbosch en Bloemfontein: Nasionale Pers Beperk.
- (in Dutch) Dreyer, eerw. A. 1907. Historisch Album van de Nederduitsche Gereformeerde Kerk in Zuid Afrika. Kaapstad: Cape Times Beperkt.
- (in Afrikaans) Hopkins, ds. H.C. 1966. Die Nederduitse Gereformeerde Kerk Rondebosch 1891–1966. Kaapstad: Feeskomitee van die N.G. Kerk, Rondebosch.
