= Dreyersdal =

Suburb of Cape Town, South Africa

- Suburb
- A typical residential street in Dreyersdal
- Interactive map of Dreyersdal
- Coordinates: 34°3′9.612″S 18°27′22.391″E
- Country: South Africa
- Province: Western Cape
- Municipality: City of Cape Town
- Main place: Cape Town

Government
  - Councilor: Carolynne Franklin (Democratic Alliance)
  - Councilor: Eddie Andrews (Democratic Alliance)

Area
  - Total: 1.59 km^{2} (0.61 sq mi)
- Elevation: 15.7 m (52 ft)

Population (2011)
  - Total: 2,130
  - Density: 1,340/km^{2} (3,470/sq mi)
- Time zone: UTC+2 (SAST)
- Postal code: 7945
- Area code: 021

Dreyersdal is a suburb of Cape Town, South Africa.

Located in the Southern Suburbs region of the city, Dreyersdal is situated on former farmland. Around a fifth of the suburb is the remainder of Dreyersdal Farm, which is home to a large lake and significant greenspace, and is now a national heritage site.

The area is mixed use, containing a combination of residential and commercial (retail) zoning.

== Geography ==
To its north, Dreyersdal is bordered by Bergvliet, a suburb which was also formed from the old Dreyersdal Farm land. The neighborhood of Tokai is to Dreyersdal's west, with Kirstenhof to its south, and Retreat to its east. It is located approximately 5 km from Westlake Business Park, 20 km from Cape Town CBD, and 30 km from Cape Town International Airport.

The Keysers River runs through the suburb, from northwest to southeast.

The entrance to Dreyersdal Farm

== Housing ==
Dreyersdal comprises a mix of detached homes (along its western border and in a wealthy pocket in its north) and gated communities (in its center and to the east), and also features a few condo buildings (also to the east).

2011 census data showed roughly 55% of the suburb's homes were owned, while approximately 45% were rented. As of April 2026, the price of a semi-detached house inside a Dreyersdal gated community is around R2.8 million. The average price of a detached home in the suburb is around R5.7 million.

== Transit ==
The suburb is close to the M3 freeway - one of Cape Town's two major metropolitan freeways. The M3 runs along the western side of the suburb, creating its border with Tokai. Dreyersdal is also close to the M4 (Main Road), as well as Ou Kaapse Weg.

== Education ==
Dreyersdal is home to Zwaanswyk High School and Zwaanswyk Academy (primary) - both co-educational public schools. Schools nearby include Sweet Valley Primary, Bergvliet Primary, Kirstenhof Primary, Bergvliet High, Reddam House Constantia, and the American International School of Cape Town.

== Demographics ==
According to 2011 census data, there were 2,130 residents living across 1,116 households in Dreyersdal. The average household size was therefore 1.91.

That same data showed that Dreyersdal residents are 57% female and 43% male. The largest age category for residents is 25 through 29, followed by 30 through 34. A total of 87% of Dreyersdal residents speak English as their first language, followed by Afrikaans at 8%.

== Commerce ==
Situated within Dreyersdal is Blue Route Mall - a major shopping mall for the Southern Suburbs region of Cape Town. Also within the suburb's borders is the Tokai on Main shopping center. Just to its south is Tokai Junction shopping center, and further south is the South Palms big box retail center.

== Governance ==
Dreyersdal is part of two municipal divisions. The southern part of the suburb falls within Ward 71, and is represented by Councilor Carolynne Franklin of the Democratic Alliance. The northern part of the suburb forms part of Ward 73, which is represented by Democratic Alliance Councilor Eddie Andrews.
