= M3 (Cape Town) =

Metropolitan route in the City of Cape Town, South Africa

Metropolitan route M3

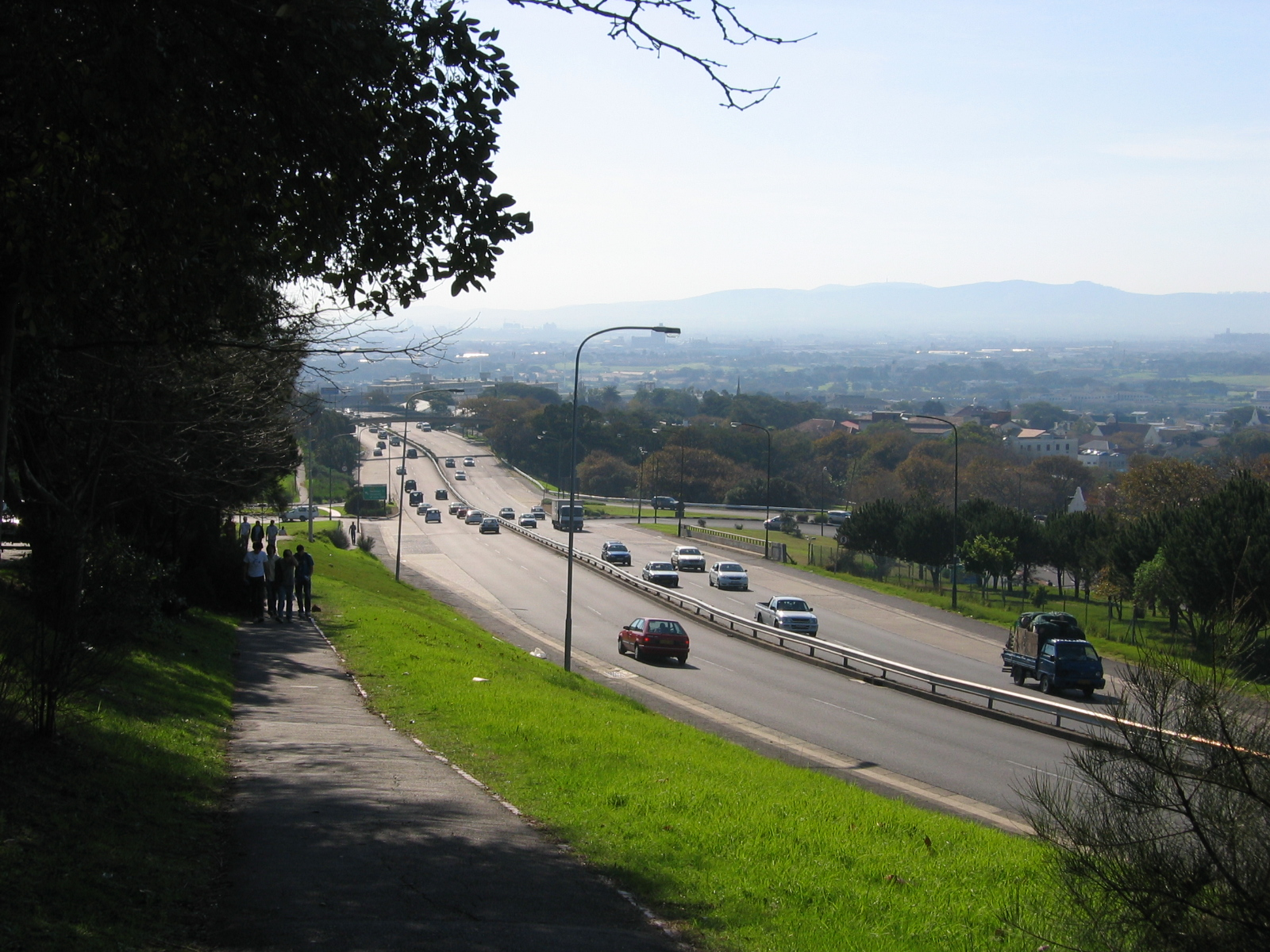
- The M3, as it passes the University of Cape Town

Route information
- Maintained by the City of Cape Town
- Length: 23 km (14 mi)

Major junctions
- North end: M62 Buitengracht Street in the Cape Town CBD

- M96 in Gardens; M59 in Gardens; M60 in Zonnebloem; N2 in Observatory; M89 in Rosebank; M146 in Newlands; M63 in Newlands; M33 in Claremont; M155 in Wynberg; M41 in Constantia; M38 in Meadowridge; M39 in Meadowridge; M40 in Tokai

- South end: M42 Steenberg Road in Westlake

Location
- Country: South Africa

Highway system
- Numbered routes of South Africa
→ M4

The M3 as it enters (left) and exits (second from left) the City Bowl

The M3 is an expressway in Cape Town, South Africa, connecting the upper part of the City Bowl to the Southern Suburbs and ending in Tokai. For most of its route it parallels - though further to the south and west - the M4 (Main Road), which was the original road connecting Cape Town CBD with the settlements to the south.

The M3 is one of two main metropolitan freeways in Cape Town, with the other being the M5, which is located to its east.

== History ==
Prior becoming the M3, a road named De Waal Drive existed and is now part of the current route. It was built as a single carriageway in 1911 for £12,000, stretching from Roeland Street to the Groote Schuur Estate. It was extended later to Rhodes Drive. In 1955, it was upgraded to a double carriageway.

== Route ==
The M3 begins at a traffic light on Buitengracht Street (the M62) and runs south-east as Buitensingel Street, a dual-carriage roadway. For the next three kilometres it runs south and then east through Gardens; it changes names regularly, being named Orange Street, Annandale Road, Mill Street, and Jutland Avenue. At Roeland Street, which is numbered as Exit 1, the M3 becomes a grade separated dual carriageway and takes on the name Philip Kgosana Drive, named after an activist who led a peaceful march along the road in 1960. Prior to 2017, this section was named De Waal Drive, after Sir Frederic de Waal, the first Administrator of the Cape Province, who commissioned the road.

This section of the M3 runs eastwards across the north face of Devil's Peak to Hospital Bend, located immediately next to Groote Schuur Hospital, where it intersects with the N2 Nelson Mandela Boulevard section (formerly Eastern Boulevard).

Around Hospital Bend, the M3 is concurrent with the N2 for approximately a kilometre as a highway (with 4 lanes southbound and 5 lanes northbound); when the N2 branches off to the east as Settlers Way, the M3 runs south as Rhodes Drive past the University of Cape Town. This section of the highway forms the western boundary of the suburbs of Mowbray, Rosebank, Rondebosch, and part of Newlands. It separates these suburbs from the Table Mountain National Park, except where the Upper Campus of the university is located west of the freeway.

In Newlands, the M3 turns away from Table Mountain and the grade separation ends; there are 5 traffic lights along this section. In this area it is named variously Union Avenue, Paradise Road and Edinburgh Drive. As it passes over Wynberg Hill, the M3 attains freeway status again. This section is known officially as the Simon van der Stel Freeway and colloquially as the Blue Route. It proceeds southward through Constantia and Tokai to terminate in Kirstenhof at exit 23, an intersection with Steenberg Road (the M42). Steenberg Road connects the terminus of the M3 with Main Road (the M4) in the east, which continues southwards along the False Bay coast to Muizenberg, Fish Hoek, and Simon's Town; and with Ou Kaapse Weg (the M64) in the west, which crosses the Silvermine mountains to Noordhoek.

The M3 passes through or alongside the following suburbs:

- Cape Town CBD
- Gardens
- Vredehoek
- Zonnebloem
- Woodstock
- Observatory
- Mowbray
- Rosebank
- Rondebosch
- Newlands
- Claremont
- Bishopscourt
- Wynberg
- Constantia
- Meadowridge
- Bergvliet
- Dreyersdal
- Tokai
- Kirstenhof

== Future ==
=== Extension plans ===
As of 2023, the City of Cape Town is considering expanding the M3 from its current southern terminus with the M42 (Steenberg Road) over the Westlake Golf Club up to a junction with the M75 (Boyes Drive).

=== M3 Congestion Relief Project ===
In recent years, traffic on the M3 has increased significantly due to the growth of Cape Town's southern suburbs. In 2023, the City of Cape Town introduced the "M3 Congestion Relief Project," aiming to redesign several at-grade intersections between Newlands and Wynberg. The project will remove two traffic lights and three medians while adding new turn lanes and pedestrian crossings, improving capacity and safety along the M3 corridor. The City expects to start the project in the second half of 2026 and continue construction into 2027.

== Junctions list ==
Municipality	Location	km	mi	Exit	Destinations	Notes
Cape Town	Cape Town CBD	0.0	0.0	—	M62 Buitengracht Street	At-grade intersection
Cape Town	Gardens	0.9	0.6	—	M96 Upper Orange Street	At-grade intersection
Cape Town	Gardens	1.5	0.9	1	M59 Buitenkant Street	
Cape Town	Zonnebloem	2.0	1.2	—	M60 Roeland Street	At-grade intersection
Cape Town	Woodstock	4.8	3.0	4	Upper Roodebloem Road	Southbound exit and entrance
Cape Town	Observatory	5.5	3.4	5A	N2 Nelson Mandela Boulevard west	Northern end of concurrency with N2; Signed as exit 5 northbound
Cape Town	Observatory	5.9	3.7	5B	N2 Settlers Way east, Cape Town International	
Cape Town	Observatory	6.5	4.0	6	N2 Nelson Mandela Boulevard west, Cape Town International, Groote Schuur Hospital	Southern end of concurrency with N2
Cape Town	Mowbray	7.1	4.4	6D	Rhodes Avenue	Southbound exit only
Cape Town	Rosebank	7.4	4.6	7	M89 Woolsack Drive, University of Cape Town	
Cape Town	Rondebosch	8.9	5.5	8	M146 Princess Anne Avenue	
Cape Town	Newlands	10.6	6.6	—	M63 Newlands Avenue	At-grade intersection
Cape Town	Newlands	11.2	7.0	—	M33 Paradise Road, Claremont	At-grade intersection
Cape Town	Bishopscourt	11.9	7.4	—	Upper Bishopscourt Road, Struben Road	At-grade intersection
Cape Town	Wynberg	13.2	8.2	12	M155 Trovato Link	Southbound exit, northbound entrance
Cape Town	Constantia	15.3	9.5	14	M41 Constantia Main Road, Hout Bay	
Cape Town	Meadowridge	16.9	10.5	15	M38 Kendal Road	Southbound exit, northbound entrance
Cape Town	Bergvliet	17.5	10.9	16	M39 Ladies Mile	
Cape Town	Tokai	21.2	13.2	21	M40 Tokai Road	
Cape Town	Westlake	23.0	14.3	23	M42 Steenberg Road, Muizenberg, Noordhoek, Ou Kaapse Weg	
