= Hospital Bend =

Major freeway junction in Cape Town

Coordinates: 33°56′36″S 18°27′42″E

Hospital Bend is a major freeway junction, located to the east of the central business district of Cape Town, South Africa. It is the junction between the N2 national route and the M3 metropolitan expressway. Its unusual design led to notoriety as a traffic bottleneck and a frequent accident location; between March 2008 and early 2010 it underwent major roadworks to address these issues. It takes its name from it curving around the grounds of Groote Schuur Hospital.

== Design ==
Diagram of Hospital Bend before upgrading.

Two highways approach Hospital Bend from the City Bowl: the N2, known as Nelson Mandela Boulevard, from the Foreshore; and the M3, known as Phillip Kgosana Drive, from Gardens. They merge west of the hospital, with the outward-bound lanes of the M3 passing on a bridge over the N2, to form a freeway of five lanes in each direction. This freeway curves around the southern side of the hospital and past the UCT Medical School before dividing again. The N2, now known as Settlers Way, goes east towards Cape Town International Airport and the Cape Flats; the M3, now known as Rhodes Drive, goes south towards the University of Cape Town, the Southern Suburbs and Muizenberg. Ramps allow vehicles to travel between Settlers Way and Rhodes Drive.

The space between the main carriageways on the Bend accommodate ramps connecting Anzio Road (an access road for the hospital) with Rhodes Drive, and a ramp allowing travel from Anzio Road to the city-bound carriageway.

== Upgrade ==
Diagram of Hospital Bend after upgrading.
