= Retreat, Cape Town =

Retreat
- Interactive map of Retreat
- Coordinates: 34°03′18″S 18°28′32″E
- Country: South Africa
- Province: Western Cape
- Municipality: City of Cape Town
- Main Place: Cape Town

Government
  - Councillor: Johannes Burger (DA)

Area
  - Total: 5.27 km^{2} (2.03 sq mi)

Population (2011)
  - Total: 25,745
  - Density: 4,890/km^{2} (12,700/sq mi)

Racial makeup (2011)
  - Black African: 9.1%
  - Coloured: 84.0%
  - Indian/Asian: 0.8%
  - White: 3.1%
  - Other: 2.9%

First languages (2011)
  - English: 59.2%
  - Afrikaans: 34.8%
  - Other: 6.0%
- Time zone: UTC+2 (SAST)
- Postal code (street): 7945, 7965
- PO box: 7965

Retreat is a suburb in Cape Town, South Africa.

== Geography ==
Retreat is bordered by Steenberg and Lavender Hill to the south, Tokai, Bergvliet and Kirstenhof to the West and Heathfield to the north. Retreat railway station is on the main line from Cape Town to Simon's Town. Main Road (which runs from Central Cape Town through to Simon's Town) runs along the west of Retreat.

== History ==
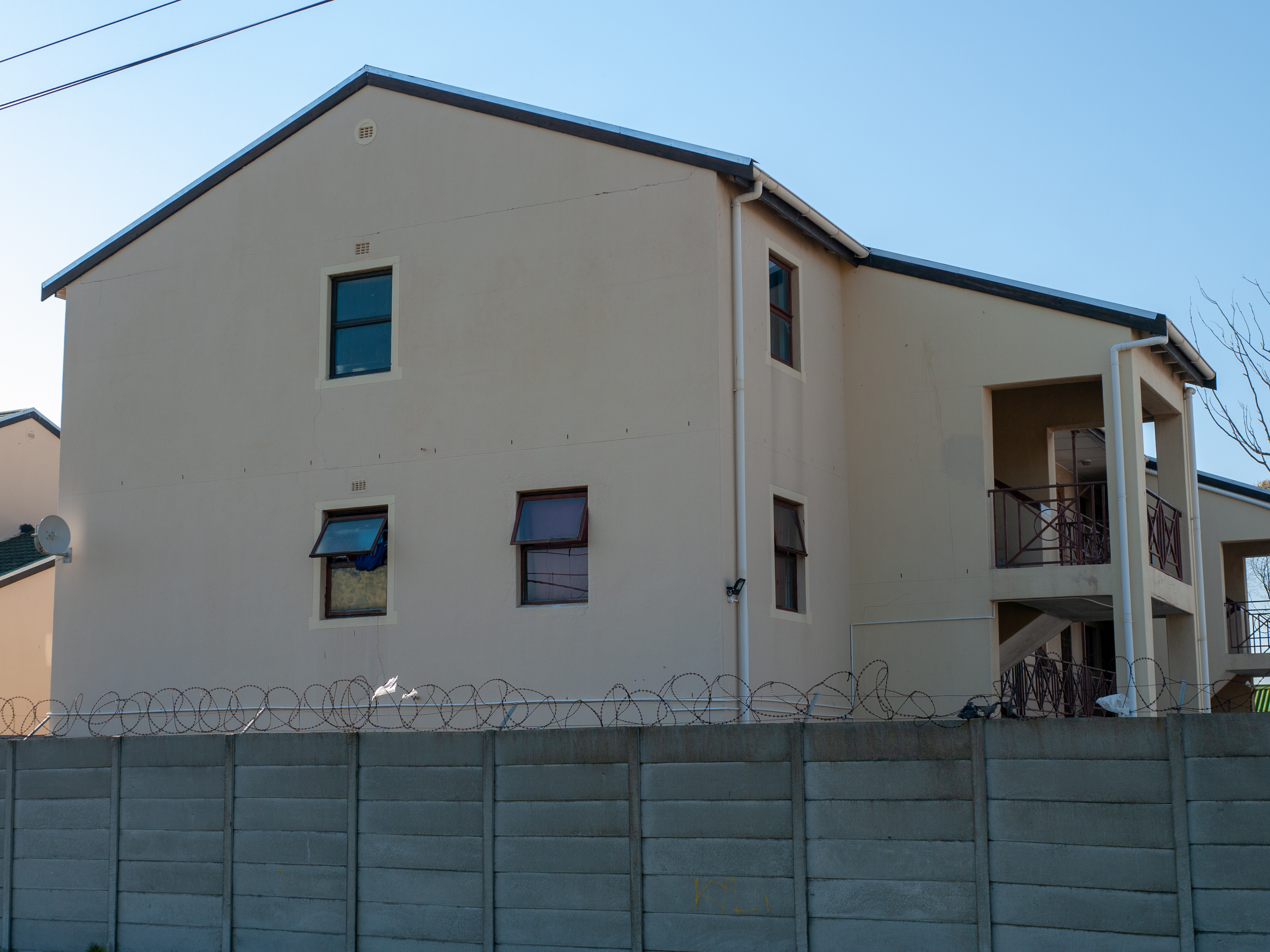
Houses in Retreat

The suburb of Retreat in Cape Town was so named because the Dutch retreated to that area when they were losing the Battle of Muizenberg. The Dutch landed there after the Retreat and declared the area to be 'Terugtrekking van de nederlandse 1795' or in English, Retreat of the Netherlands 1795. The signage with 'Terugtrekking van de nederlandse 1795' written on it can be found at a Museum in Cape Town, South Africa.

== Notable people ==
- Roegchanda Pascoe, activist.
- Jonathan Jansen, academic and former rector of the University of the Free State.
- Winston Mankunku Ngozi
