= Bergvliet =

Southern suburb of Cape Town, South Africa

- Suburb
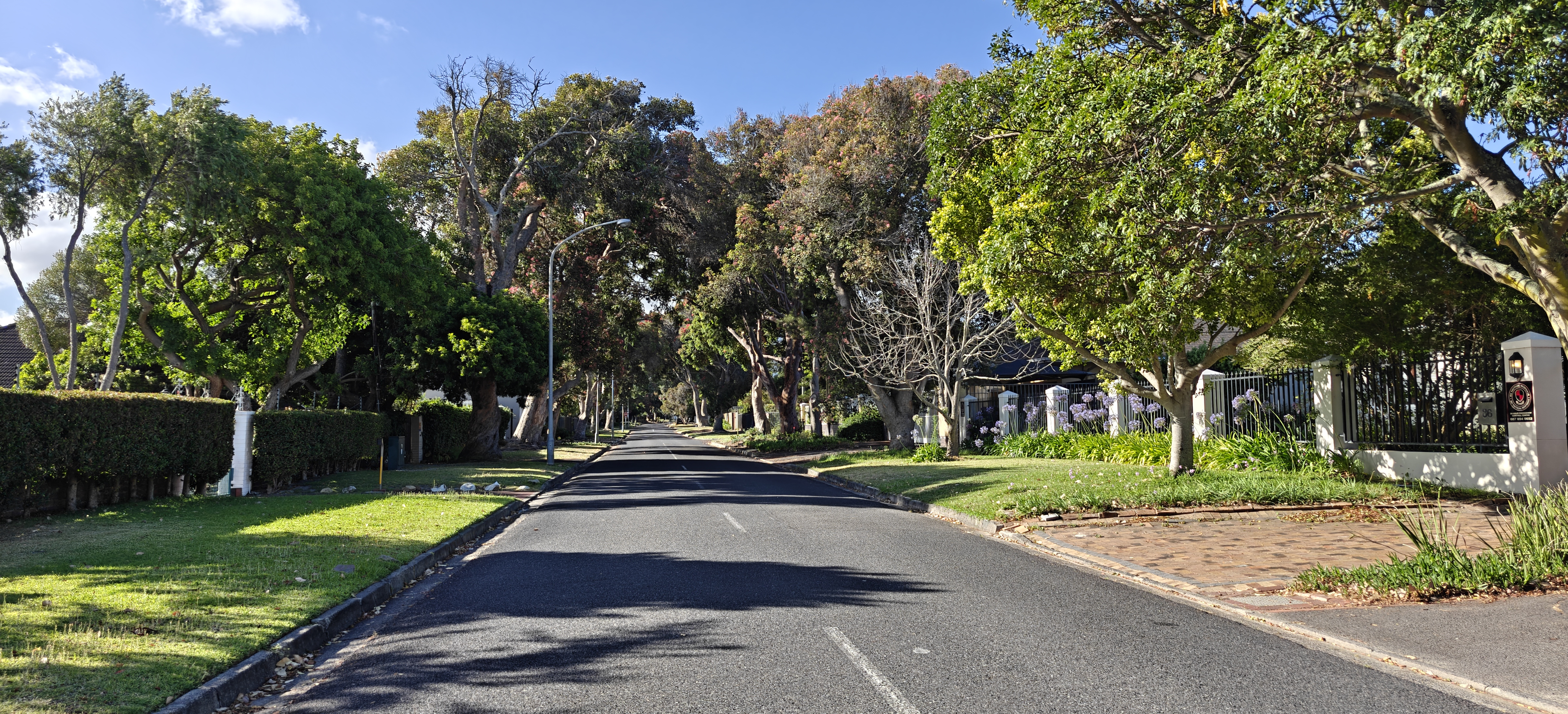
- A typical tree-lined Bergvliet street, with detached houses
- Interactive map of Bergvliet
- Coordinates: 34°2′45″S 18°27′15″E
- Country: South Africa
- Province: Western Cape
- Municipality: City of Cape Town
- Main Place: Cape Town

Government
  - Councilor: Eddie Andrews (Democratic Alliance)

Area
  - Total: 2.50 km^{2} (0.97 sq mi)
- Elevation: 27 m (89 ft)

Population (2011)
  - Total: 4,428
  - Density: 1,770/km^{2} (4,590/sq mi)

Racial makeup (2011)
  - Black African: 5.0%
  - Coloured: 6.2%
  - Indian/Asian: 1.1%
  - White: 86.3%
  - Other: 1.4%

First languages (2011)
  - English: 91.5%
  - Afrikaans: 5.9%
  - Other: 2.6%
- Time zone: UTC+2 (SAST)
- Postal code (street): 7945
- Area code: 021

Bergvliet is a large, affluent, tree-lined residential suburb in the Southern Suburbs region of Cape Town, South Africa.

Bergvliet, which means "Mountain Streamlet" in Afrikaans, is located on former farmland, and comprises mostly large, detached homes.

== History ==
Bergvliet was formerly part of a large farm (called Groot Constantia), which was owned by then-Governor Simon van der Stel. He received the farm in 1685, and in 1716, the land was divided into two separate farmlands - Bergvliet and Constantia. A large part of the Constantia farmland remains today, as the Groot Constantia and Klein Constantia wine farms.

In 1769, then-owner Petrus Eksteen, built the Cape-Dutch homestead, Bergvliet Manor House, on the Bergvliet farm.

The estate was purchased by William Hertzog in 1865, and was later handed down to his sisters. Two roads in Bergvliet (Hertzog and Jeffcoat) are named after members of this family.

The farm was divided again in 1930, this time into a northern portion, known as Kreupelbosch, and the southern portion, called Bergvliet. These two areas remain today, as suburbs of the same name.

In 1945, the Division Council of the Cape purchased Bergvliet. Around this time, many portions of the farm were divided and sold.

In 1989, Bergvliet Manor House was declared to be a National Monument, and in 2011, it was recognized as a Provincial Heritage Site.

== Geography ==
Bergvliet is bordered by Constantia to the west, Meadowridge to the north, Dreyersdal and Tokai to the south, and Heathfield to the east.

The suburb provides easy access to the M3 freeway, which runs north to Cape Town CBD, and south to Westlake.

== Culture ==
Bergvliet is close to the Constantia mountain range, Kirstenbosch Botanical Gardens, the Constantia wine valley, Meadowridge Library (one of Cape Town's top circulating libraries), and provides easy access to many nature trails, hikes, Muizenberg beach, and the scenic False Bay region.

The suburb is known for its tree-lined streets, peaceful lifestyle, and affluent homebuyers.

Bergvliet has a very active neighborhood watch (crime watch) called BKM, which stands for Bergvliet, Kreupelbosch and Meadowridge - the names of the member suburbs. A Public Benefit Organization registered with the City of Cape Town Department of Community Safety, BKM operates a security control room, and runs patrols of the area to maintain a safe environment for its homeowners.

Furthermore, the area's safety is bolstered by two local private security (armed response) companies - BH Security and Pro-Sec - both of which permanently station vehicles and guards throughout the area.

The area's ratepayers association, BMRA, is also very active, and works to protect the area, and ensure its natural environment remains sustainable.

The neighborhood houses the Bergvliet Squash Club, Bergvliet Tennis Club, and Bergvliet Sports Association.

== Education ==
Bergvliet is home to three schools; Bergvliet High School, Bergvliet Primary School, and Sweet Valley Primary School. All three of these schools were built in the late 1940s to early 1950s. Bervliet is also close to Constantia Waldorf School.

A variety of preschool and early education centers service the area.

== Demographics ==
According to the 2011 Census, the population of Bergvliet was 4,428. In the same census, 2,313 (52.28%) Bergvliet residents were female, while 2,115 (47.74%) were male.

== Commerce ==
Most of Bergvliet comprises large, detached homes, however, the suburb is home to a few commercial lots. The suburb has numerous shopping centers nearby, including Constantia Village, Constantia Emporium, Tokai On Main, Tokai Junction, Harry Goemans Center, Meadowridge Park n Shop, and 3Arts Village. It is also close to Blue Route Mall.

The suburb is also close to numerous private hospitals, including Constantiaberg Mediclinic and Melomed Tokai, as well as the Tokai Medicross clinic.

== Governance ==
Bergvliet is managed by the Bergvliet Meadowridge Ratepayers Association (BMRA), which advocates on behalf of homeowners in the area, and neighboring Meadowridge. Established in 1947, and in its current form in 1973, the BMRA represents its residents and corresponds with the City of Cape Town on matters relevant to them.

The suburb is governed at the local level by Cape Town's Deputy Mayor, Eddie Andrews, a member of the centrist Democratic Alliance.
