= Statues of Louis Botha =

There are statues of Gen. Louis Botha in Cape Town, Durban, and Pretoria, all in the country of which he was the first Prime Minister, South Africa.

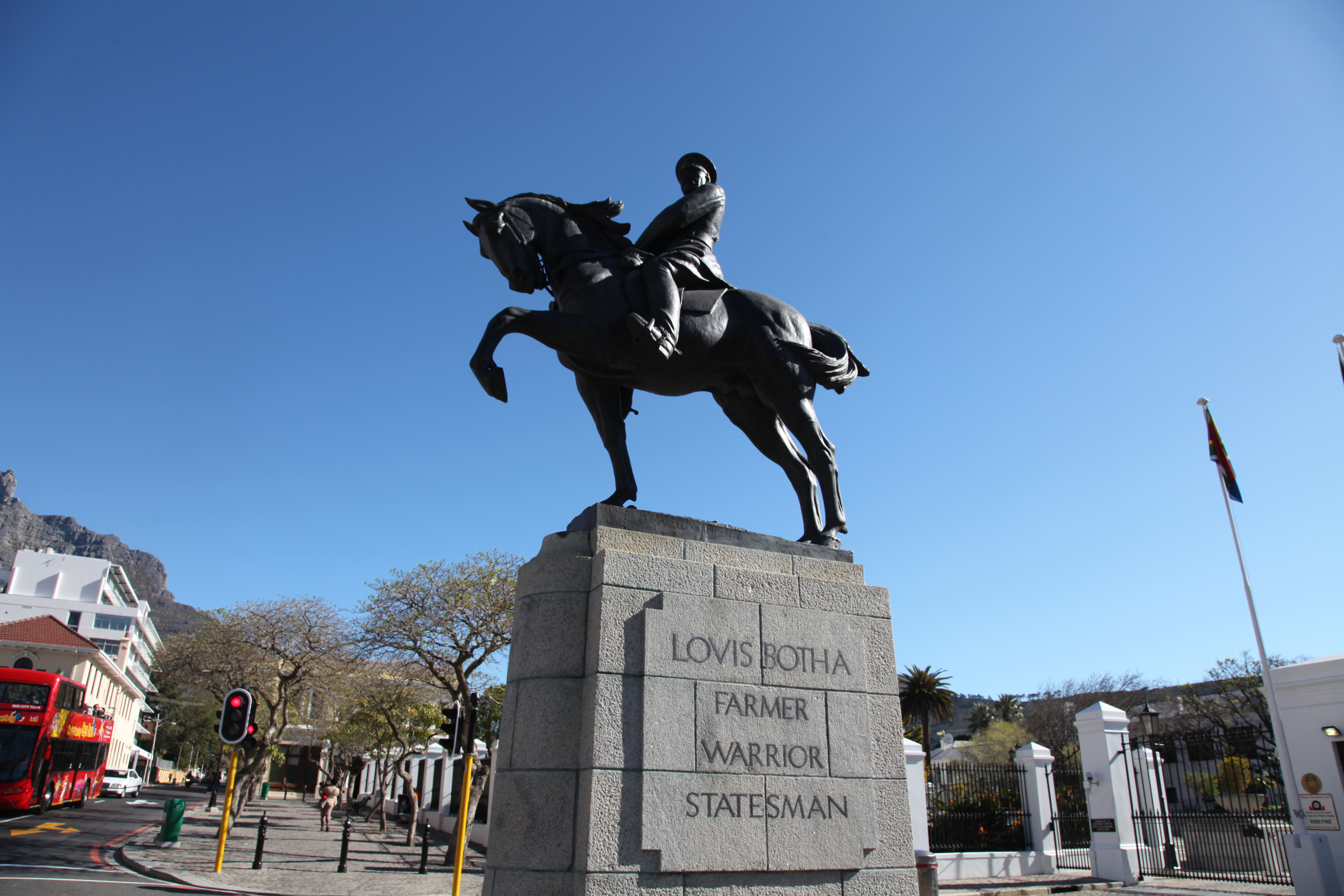
A statue of Louis Botha on Stal Plein in front of the House of Parliament in Cape Town.

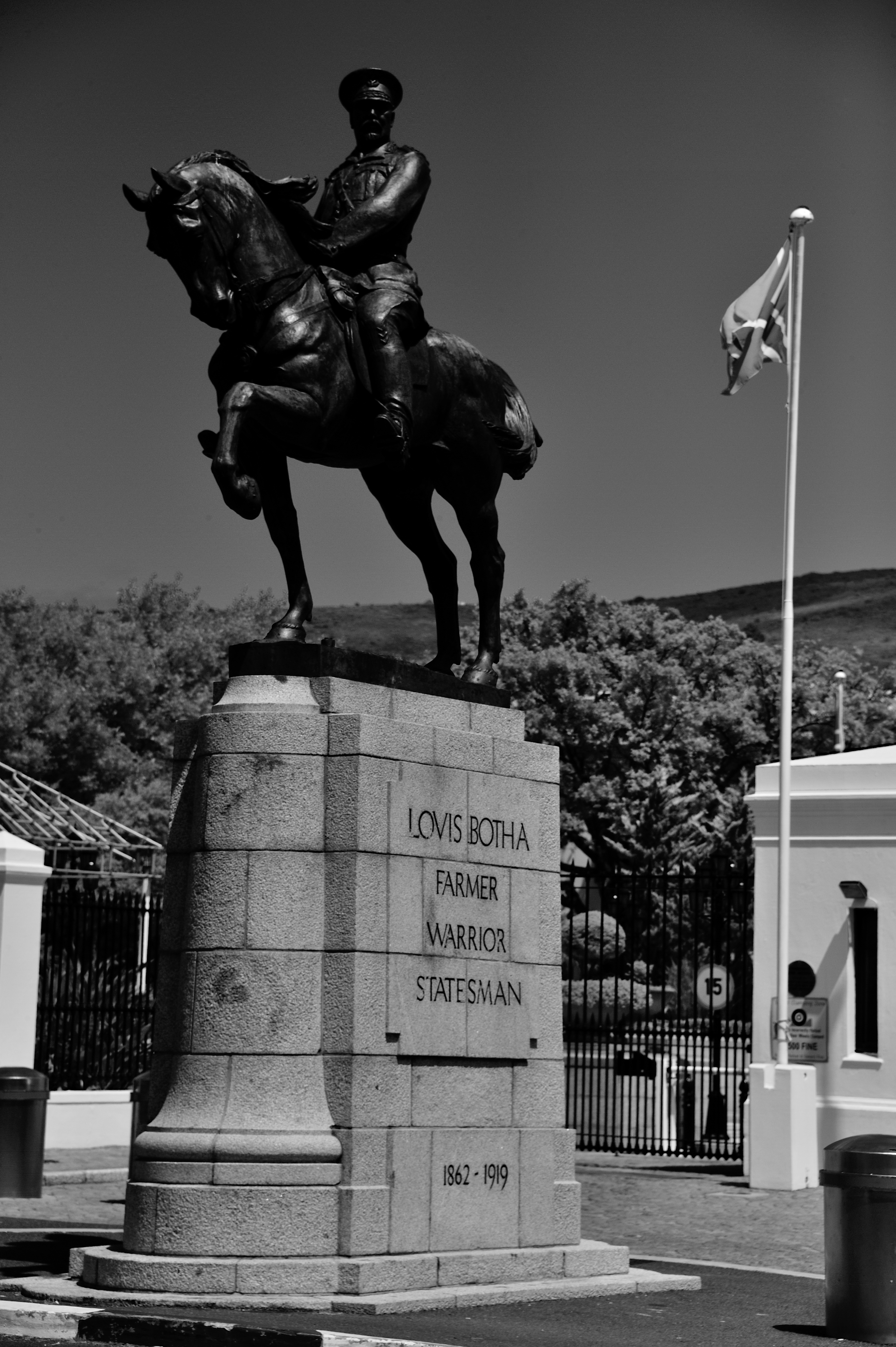
Statue of Louis Botha in front of the South African Parliament building on Roeland Street, Cape Town.

== Cape Town ==
An equestrian statue of Gen. Botha stands on Stable Square atop Plein Street in Cape Town (33°55′40″S 18°25′10″E). The sculptor was the Italian Romano Romanelli, and the statue was unveiled on February 2, 1931, by the wife of Sir Nicolaas Frederic de Waal. The inscription on the statue reads: "Louis Botha, farmer, warrior, statesman."

The statue was vandalized and smeared with red paint in April 2015 after the EFF encouraged members to destroy statues of "apartheid icons".

== Durban ==
The first memorial to Botha built was a statue in the Botha Gardens (29°51′38″S 31°00′35″E) between King Dinuzulu Road (formerly Berea Rd) and Julius Nyerere Street (formerly Warwick Lane). Since 2008, a statue of King Dinuzulu stands near that of Botha. The bronze statue of Botha by Anton van Wouw was unveiled by Gen. Jan Smuts on June 14, 1923. The simple plaque reads "Louis Botha 1862–1919." He is portrayed as slightly larger than life and stands on a 3-m pedestal.

== Pretoria ==
Another equestrian statue of Botha lies in front of the Union Buildings facing Church Street (25°44′39″S 28°12′40″E), depicting the Commandant-General of the South African Republic at the time of the Second Boer War. The bronze statue by Coert Steynberg was unveiled on August 15, 1946, by Botha's oldest daughter, Mrs. Helen de Waal, and the Prime Minister of South Africa, Gen. Jan Smuts, gave a speech for the occasion. The statue weighs 4 tons, stands around 5 m high, and stands on a pedestal 4½ m high. Six bronze plaques on the pedestal narrate high points of his career. The statue was paid for by public donations.

== Bibliography ==
- Grobler, Jackie. Monumentale erfenis. 'n Gids tot 50 Afrikaner-gedenktekens. Pretoria: Kontak, 2012. ISBN 978-0-9584313-5-4
- Standard Encyclopaedia of Southern Africa, vol. 2. Cape Town: Nasou, 1970.
