= Southern Suburbs, Cape Town =

Sub-region of Cape Town, South Africa

Southern Suburbs
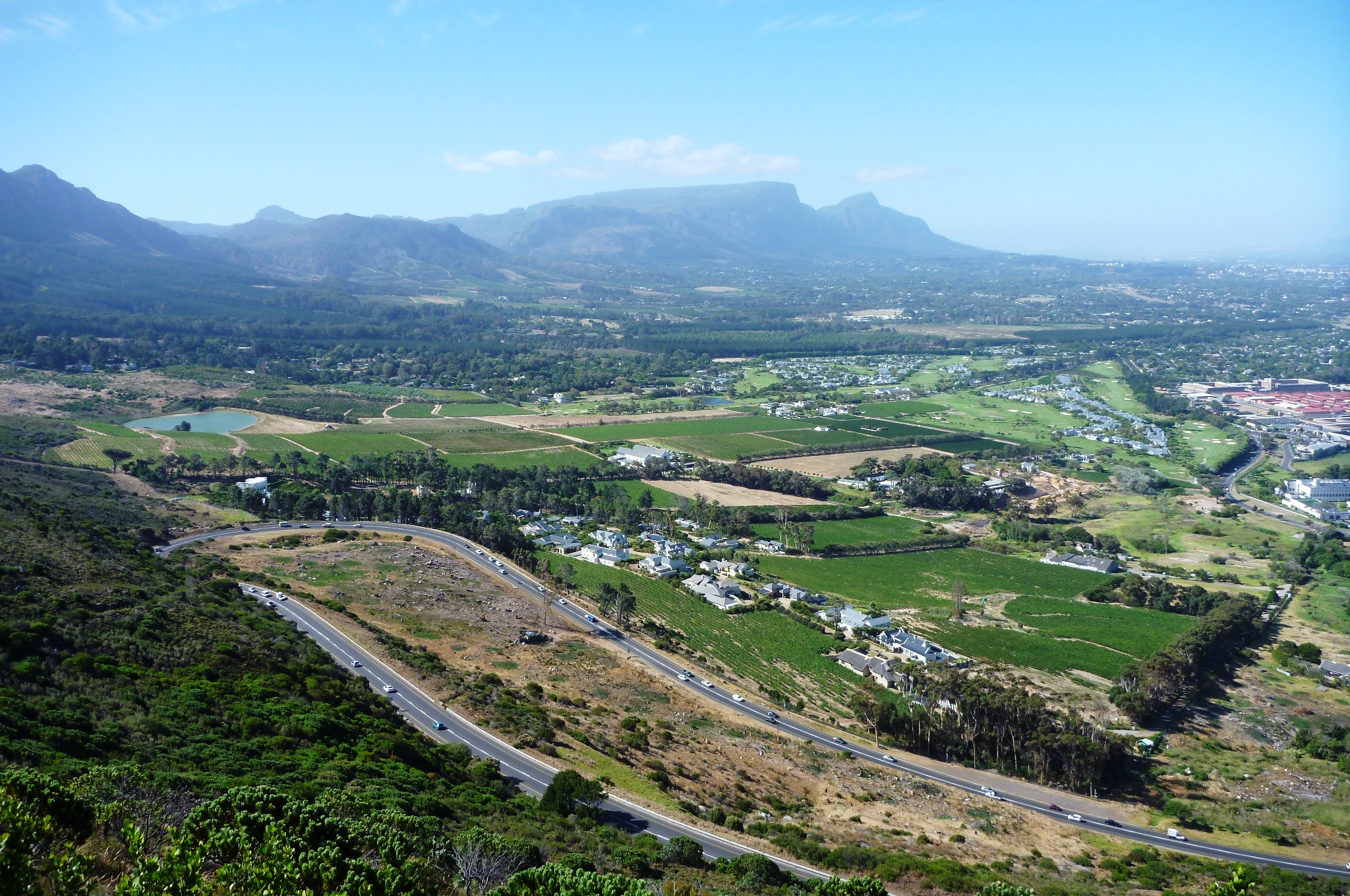
- The Southern Suburbs viewed from Ou Kaapse Weg
- Interactive map of Southern Suburbs
- Coordinates: 33°59′0″S 18°28′30″E
- Country: South Africa
- Province: Western Cape
- Municipality: City of Cape Town
- Main Place: Cape Town

Area
  - Total: 104.81 km^{2} (40.47 sq mi)

Population (2011)
  - Total: 232,612
  - Density: 2,219.4/km^{2} (5,748.1/sq mi)
- Time zone: UTC+2 (SAST)

The Southern Suburbs region includes the following neighborhoods: Observatory (1), Mowbray (2), Rosebank (3), Rondebosch (4), Newlands (5), Claremont (6), Kenilworth (7), Bishopscourt (8), Wynberg (9), Plumstead (10), Diep River (11), Meadowridge (12), Bergvliet (13), Dreyersdal (14), Heathfield (15), Constantia (16), Kirstenhof (17), Tokai (18), Westlake (19), Marina da Gama (20), and Muizenberg (21)

The Southern Suburbs are a group of predominantly affluent, Anglophone suburbs in Cape Town, Western Cape, South Africa. The region is home to mainly detached homes, and features tree-lined streets and numerous public parks.

The region comprises the suburbs of Bergvliet, Bishopscourt, Claremont, Constantia, Diep River, Dreyersdal, Harfield Village, Heathfield, Kenilworth, Kirstenhof, Marina da Gama, Meadowridge, Mowbray, Muizenberg, Newlands, Observatory, Plumstead, Rondebosch, Rosebank, Tokai, Dennendal, Westlake, and Wynberg. Peripheral suburbs toward the geographical eastern edge further include, to some extent, Pinelands, Thornton, Sybrand Park, Rondebosch East, Crawford, Lansdowne, Kenwyn, Wetton, and Ottery.

== History ==
The Southern Suburbs were some of the earliest parts of Cape Town to develop – most especially the areas around the Constantia Winelands.

During the Apartheid era, the Southern Suburbs were predominantly "whites only" residential areas.

In mid-2025, the Southern Suburbs had some of Cape Town's highest property prices, with some large detached homes selling for as much as around R80 million. The region is among the most popular in South Africa for real estate, both with local and international buyers.

== Geography ==
Cape Town's Southern Suburbs lie to the southeast of the slopes of Table Mountain within rich valleys and vast plains reaching from just south of the Table Bay industrial neighborhoods in the north to the False Bay coastal suburbs and the Cape Peninsula cliffs to the south, and are crossed north-south by the M3 and M5 freeways.

The suburb of Newlands is recorded to be the wettest suburb in South Africa.

== Demographics ==
The Southern Suburbs had a population during the 2011 census of 232,612 people. Taking a total area of 104.81 km² into account, the region's population density was approximately 2,219 people per km².

In the same census, there were 74,103 households in the Southern Suburbs, with an average household size of 3.13 people.

The majority of residents were White (far above the average for Cape Town), followed by Coloured people. Approximately 65% of residents spoke English as their first language, making the region one of the most English-dominant in Cape Town. This was followed by Afrikaans, at around 25%. Many households were categorized as upper-mid or upper-income.

With the Southern Suburbs being a predominantly English-speaking region, some contrasts are made between it and the predominantly Afrikaans-speaking Northern Suburbs region of Cape Town.

From a Southern Suburbs perspective, the Northern Suburbs lie behind what is locally known as the 'Boerewors Curtain', which is used, often jokingly, by some Capetonians to draw an informal crossover point between the English-speaking Southern Suburbs and the Afrikaans-speaking Northern Suburbs, and their respective cultures.

== Housing ==
Housing in the Southern Suburbs is described by real-estate company Seeff Housing Group as some of the most sought after in Cape Town, with the region offering peaceful neighborhoods with tree-lined streets, well-maintained infrastructure, an abundance of green spaces, and easy access to amenities.

Southern Suburbs housing comprises mostly detached homes, townhouses, and low-rise condos. Plots and homes are generally larger on average than in other parts of the city.

Housing supply in the region is limited, and price increases outpace many other parts of not only Cape Town, but South Africa as a whole. The region contains some of South Africa's most affluent neighborhoods. As of late 2025, the average price of a 2-bedroom home in the Southern Suburbs was R2.35 million, and the average for a 3-bedroom property was R3.3 million, both well above the national average.

== Amenities ==
The Southern Suburbs has many scenic public spaces, including nature trails, hiking spots, wine farms, forests, and parks. These range from public amenities such as Kirstenbosch Garden, Newlands Forest, and Silvermine Nature Reserve, to private establishments such as Groot Constantia, Constantia Uitsig, Buitenverwagting, Steenberg Estate, and Westlake Golf Club.

Kirstenbosch Garden

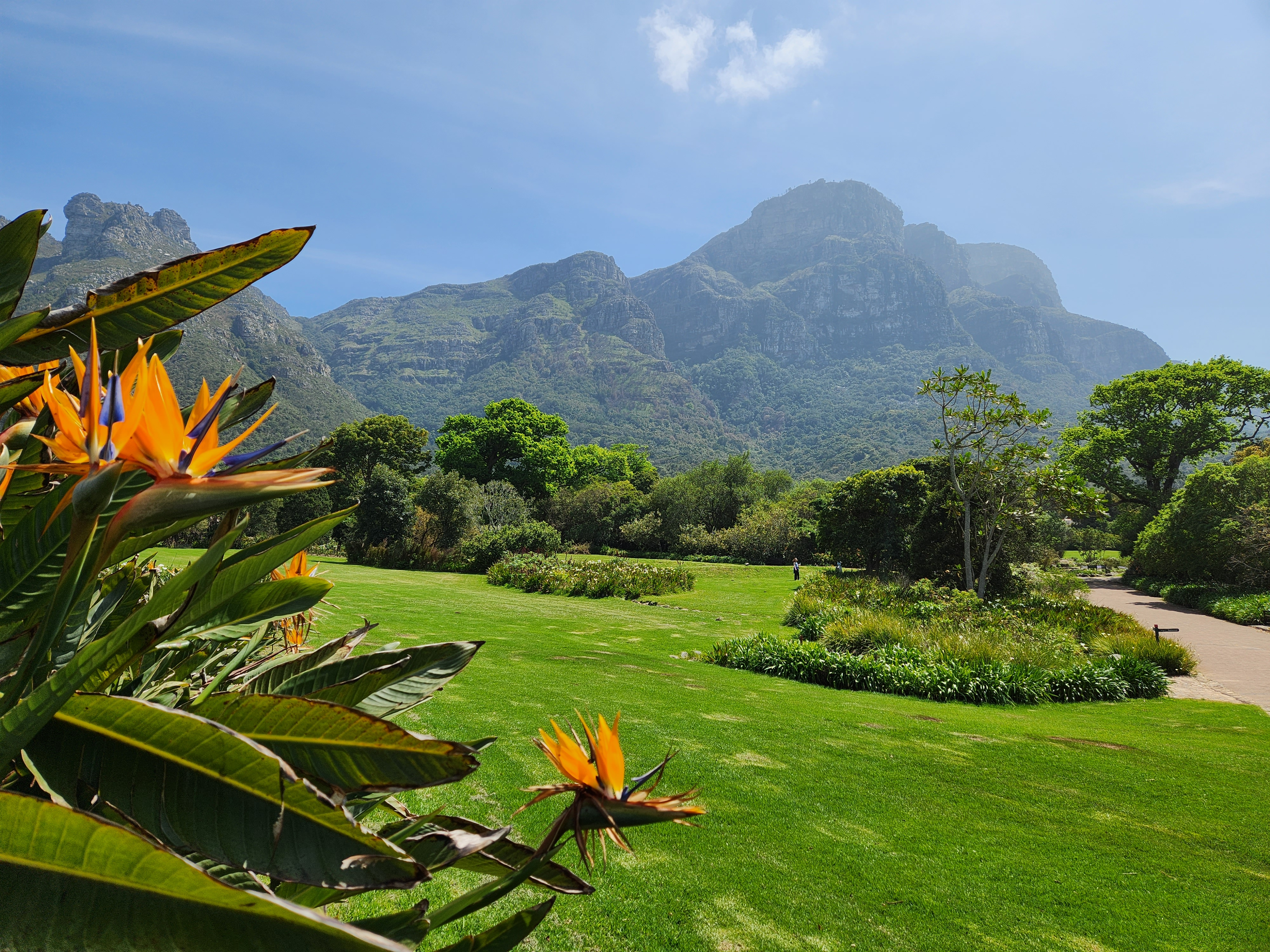
Kirstenbosch Garden

The Kirstenbosch National Botanical Garden is one of the oldest botanical gardens in South Africa and is situated along the eastern slopes of Table Mountain in the suburb of Bishopscourt. There are many unique flower species in this garden that are not found anywhere else in the world.

Rhodes Memorial

The Rhodes Memorial is a popular tourist attraction on the slopes of Devil's Peak in the suburb of Rondebosch. This memorial commemorates a former British South African politician, Cecil John Rhodes. This memorial is nearby to the University of Cape Town.

Newlands Forest

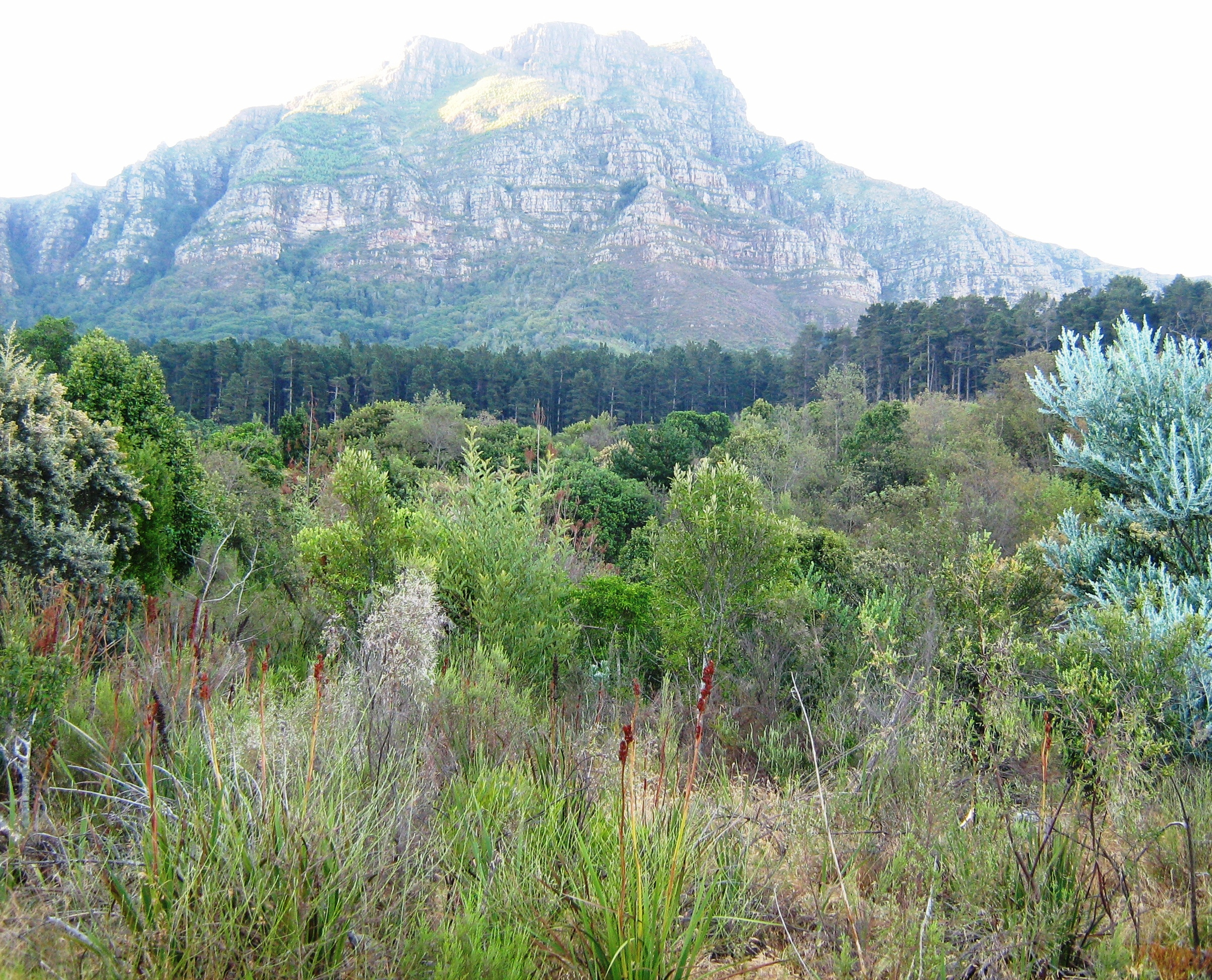
Newlands Forest

Newlands Forest is a popular forest along the slopes of Table Mountain at Newlands. It includes many hiking trails and braai area. Ruins of the old "Paradise" estate where Lady Anne Barnard lived for a portion of her stay in Cape Town lay deep within this forest.

Golf

There are multiple golf courses in the Southern Suburbs, including King David Mowbray Golf Club, Rondebosch Golf Course, Royal Cape Golf Club, Westlake Golf Club, and Steenberg Golf Club.

Arderne Gardens

Arderne Gardens is a public park and arboretum tucked away from the busy Main Road in Claremont. It was established in 1845 and is a popular venue for wedding photographs. The focus of the Arderne Gardens is the cultivation of exotic species.

== Commerce ==
The suburb of Claremont is an important commercial hub in the Southern Suburbs and is the location of numerous offices.

Malls situated in the Southern Suburbs include Blue Route Mall and Cavendish Square. Shopping centers in the Southern Suburbs include Constantia Emporium, Constantia Village, Steenberg Village, Meadowridge Shopping Center, 3Arts Village, and Palmyra Junction.

== Education ==
=== Tertiary education ===
The Southern Suburbs is home to the University of Cape Town, which is situated beneath the mountain, on the border of Newlands and Rondebosch. Other tertiary education institutions in the area include Varsity College, AFDA, Cape Audio College, The South African School of Applied Psychology, and Damelin Mowbray.

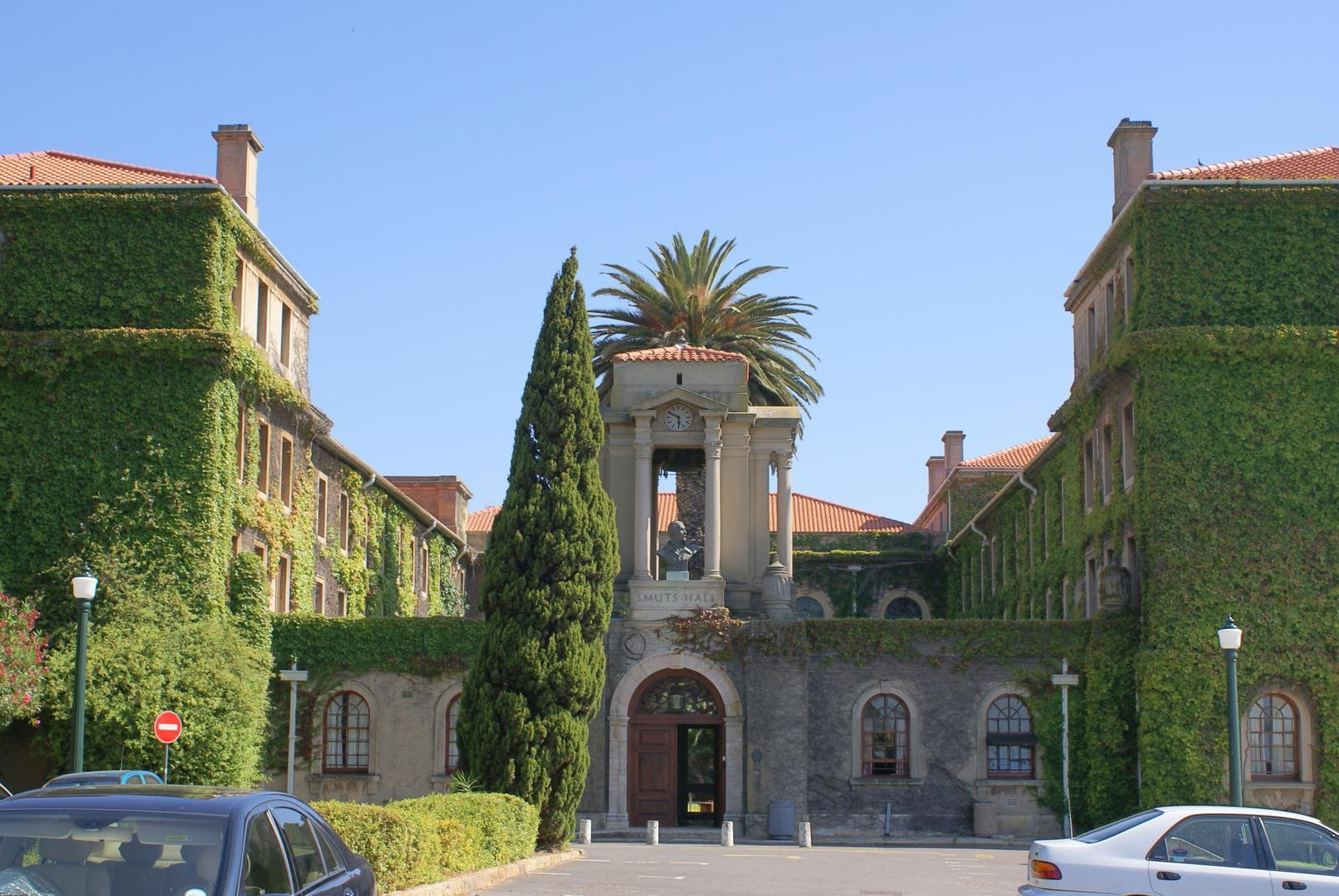
Buildings on the University of Cape Town's Upper Campus

=== Schools ===
The Southern Suburbs offers many good public and private primary and high schools, including some of the top-ranked schools in South Africa. Most of these schools are found in the suburbs of Rondebosch, Newlands, Claremont, and Wynberg. Some schools have catchment areas, requiring accepted applicants to reside within a certain radius of the school.

List of high schools:

•Rustenburg Girls’ High School •Rondebosch Boys High School •Westerford High School •Groote Schuur High School •South African College High Schools •Bishops Diocesan College •San Souci Girls’ High School •Livingstone High School •Windsor High School •Herschel Girls Secondary School for girls •Wynberg Boys’ High School •Wynberg Girls’ High School

List of primary schools:

•Rustenberg Girls’ Junior School •Oakhurst Girls’ Primary School •Groote Schuur Primary School •Mickelfield School for Girls •Golden Grove Primary School •South African College Junior School •Grove Primary School •Greenfield Girls’ Primary School •Herschel Girls Preparatory School •Wynberg Boys’ Junior School •Wynberg Girls’ Junior School •Constantia Primary School

== Transport ==
One of the most well-known roads in the Southern Suburbs is the historic Main Road, which starts in the City Bowl and goes through Observatory, Mowbray, Rondebosch, Newlands, Claremont, Kenilworth, Wynberg, Plumstead, Diep River, Bergvliet, Tokai, Retreat, Muizenberg, Lakeside, and then onwards to the False Bay region.

Running blocks parallel to the main road is the Southern line, a train line primarily serving the southern suburbs linking Cape Town to Simon’s Town.

The bulk of the Southern Suburbs are connected to Cape Town CBD in the north and Muizenberg in the south by the M3 and M5 freeways. These roads also provide connections to the N1, for travel towards Paarl, and the N2 for travel towards Strand.

As per metro designations, the Southern Suburbs use the older "CA" and newer "CAA" type vehicle license plates.

== See also ==
- List of Cape Town suburbs
