= Kirstenhof =

Suburb of Cape Town, South Africa

- Interactive map of Kirstenhof
- Coordinates: 34°4′10.24″S 18°27′14.705″E
- Country: South Africa
- Province: Western Cape
- Municipality: City of Cape Town

Government
  - Councillor: Carolynne Franklin (DA)

Area
  - Total: 1.52 km^{2} (0.59 sq mi)

Population (2011)
  - Total: 4,515
  - Density: 2,970/km^{2} (7,690/sq mi)

Racial makeup (2011)
  - Black African: 3.8%
  - Coloured: 6.9%
  - Indian/Asian: 1.2%
  - White: 86.8%
  - Other: 1.3%

First languages (2011)
  - English: 89.5%
  - Afrikaans: 7.5%
  - isiZulu: 0.3%
  - Other: 2.7%
- Time zone: UTC+2 (SAST)
- Postal code (street): 7945
- Area code: 021

Kirstenhof is a residential suburb located in the Southern Suburbs region of Cape Town, South Africa.

== Geography ==
Kirstenhof is located in the Southern Suburbs region of Cape Town, which is primarily residential, and where some of the city's most desirable properties are located.

The suburb is located near the M3 freeway, which forms the neighborhood's western border. On the eastern side is a mix of retail and light industrial buildings. To the north is Blue Route Mall - located within the suburb of Tokai. To the south is the suburb of Lakeside as well as the Westlake Golf Club.

In terms of commerce, Kirstenhof is near multiple business parks, including Westlake Business Park and Steenberg Office Park.

Kirstenhof is situated approximately 21 km from Cape Town CBD, 29 km from Cape Town International Airport, and 26 km from Century City.

== Housing ==
Kirstenhof is a residential suburb comprising mainly small and medium sized detached homes, with a few townhouses and apartments. As of March 2026, the average price of a medium sized detached home in the neighborhood was R6.61 million.

== Amenities ==
Located within or near Kirstenhof are:

- Kirstenhof Primary School
- Blue Route Mall
- Westlake Village shopping center
- Westlake Shopping Center
- South Palms retail center
- The Tokai-on-Main shopping center
- Melomed Tokai private hospital
- Westlake Golf Club
- Silvermine Nature Reserve
