= Nicolaas Frederic de Waal =

Sir Nicolaas Frederic de Waal KCMG
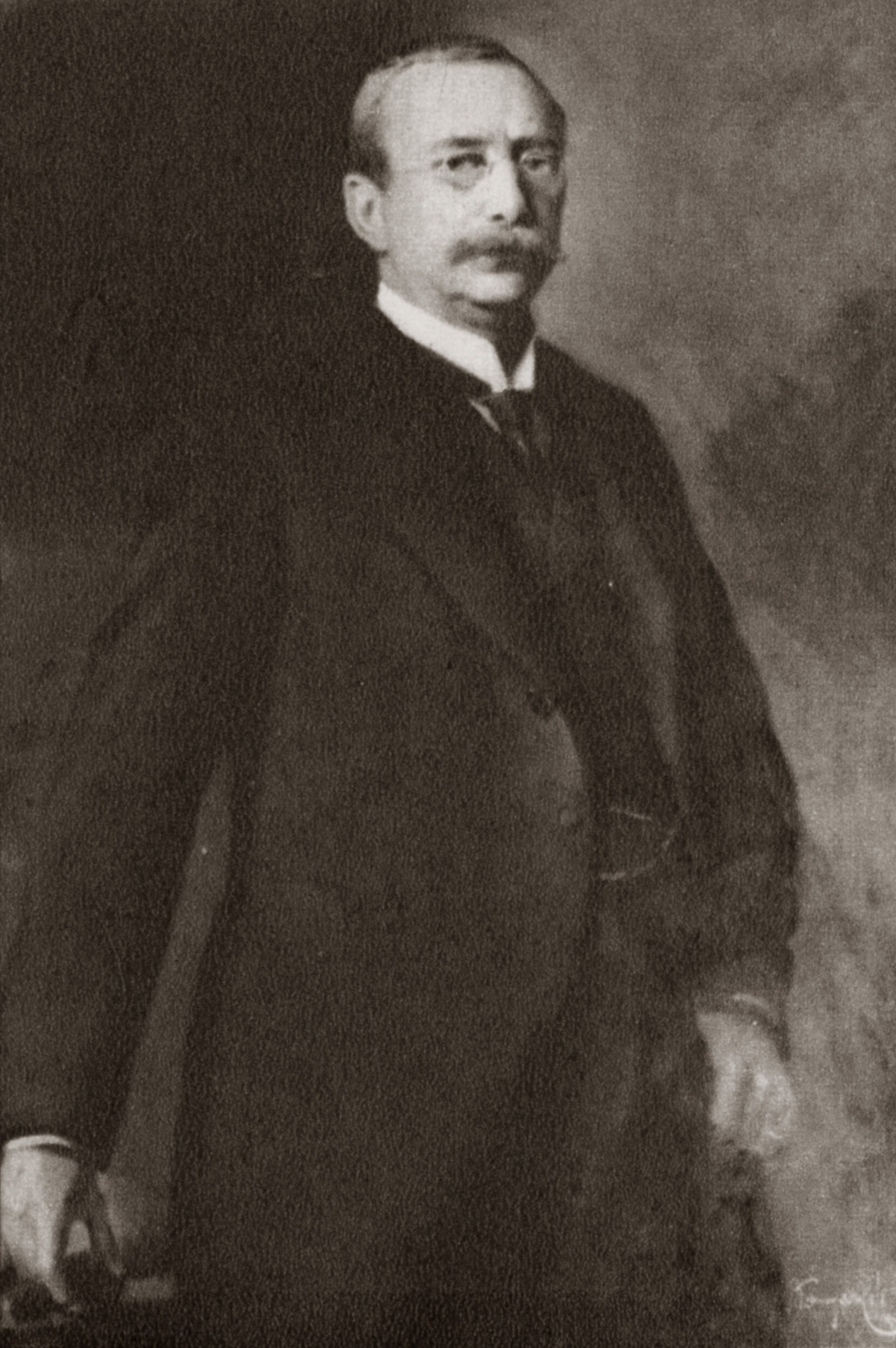
- Sir Nicolaas Frederic de Waal

1st Administrator of the Cape Province
- In office 1910–1926

Sir Nicolaas Frederic de Waal KCMG (8 July 1853 – 5 April 1932) was the first Administrator of the Cape Province in South Africa. He was born in Rotterdam, Netherlands and arrived in South Africa in 1880 where he settled in Middelburg and opened a law practice. He became a leading figure in the Afrikaner Bond and in 1898 became a member of the Parliament of the Cape of Good Hope. In 1908, he became Colonial Secretary in the cabinet of Prime Minister John X. Merriman.

After the formation of the Union of South Africa in 1910, De Waal became the Administrator of the Cape Province until his retirement in 1926. As Administrator, he initiated the construction of a high-level road linking the city to the Southern Suburbs, known until 2017 as De Waal Drive. He also initiated the construction of Chapman's Peak Drive between Hout Bay and Noordhoek, a major engineering challenge.

De Waal served as Chief Scout for the Boy Scouts Association in the Cape Province between 1912 and 1926.
