= Westlake, Cape Town =

Westlake
- Interactive map of Westlake
- Coordinates: 34°04′33″S 18°26′16″E
- Country: South Africa
- Province: Western Cape
- Municipality: City of Cape Town
- Main Place: Cape Town

Government
  - Councillor: Carolynne Franklin (Ward 71) (Democratic Alliance)

Area
  - Total: 2.02 km^{2} (0.78 sq mi)

Population (2011)
  - Total: 6,452
  - Density: 3,190/km^{2} (8,270/sq mi)

Racial makeup (2011)
  - Black African: 50.3%
  - Coloured: 25.9%
  - Indian/Asian: 0.8%
  - White: 20.6%
  - Other: 2.4%

First languages (2011)
  - English: 28.9%
  - Afrikaans: 26.3%
  - Xhosa: 28.9%
  - isiZulu: 2.3%
  - Other: 13.6%
- Time zone: UTC+2 (SAST)
- Postal code (street): 7945
- Area code: 021

Westlake is a residential suburb located in the Southern Suburbs of Cape Town. According to the 2011 census, the suburb has a population of 6,452 people with 2,076 households.

Between 1942 and 1944, Westlake was predominantly used as a military area for the Union Defence Force. After the military left, Westlake was repurposed into a residential suburb for civilian occupation.

The United States Consulate in Cape Town is located in Westlake.

== Amenities ==
- Westlake Business Park
- Westlake Shopping Centre
- Westlake Golf Course
