= Melomed =

South African private hospital group

Melomed Hospital Holdings

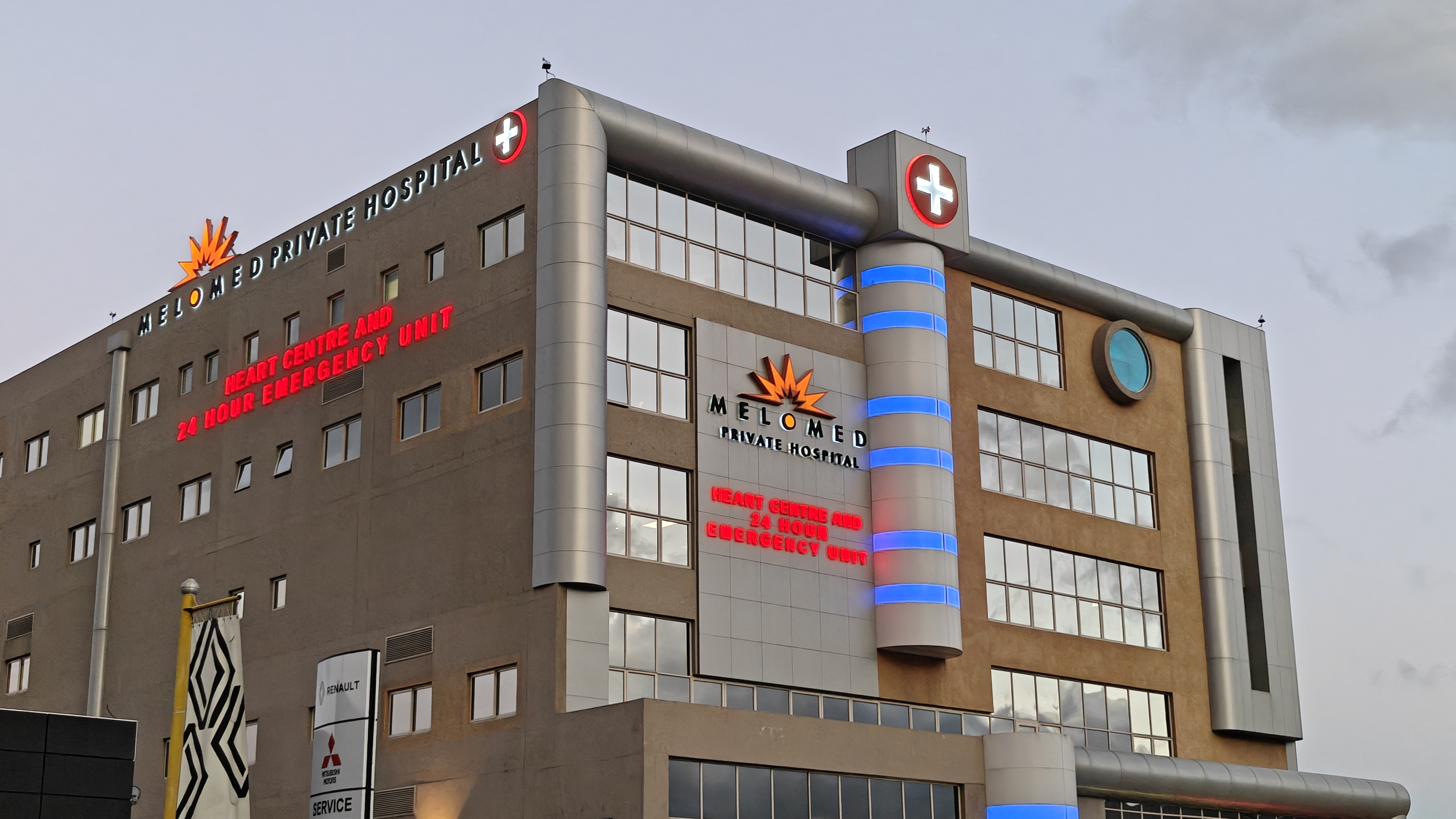
- The Melomed Tokai private hospital in Tokai, Cape Town
- Type: Private
- Industry: Private hospitals Healthcare
- Founded: 1989; 37 years ago
- Headquarters: Cape Town, South Africa
- Number of locations: 6 (2025)
- Area served: South Africa
- Key people: Ebrahim Bhorat (Founder and Chairman); Ismail Bhorat (Executive Director)
- Services: Healthcare
- Number of employees: 5,000+ (2025)
- Website: melomed.co.za

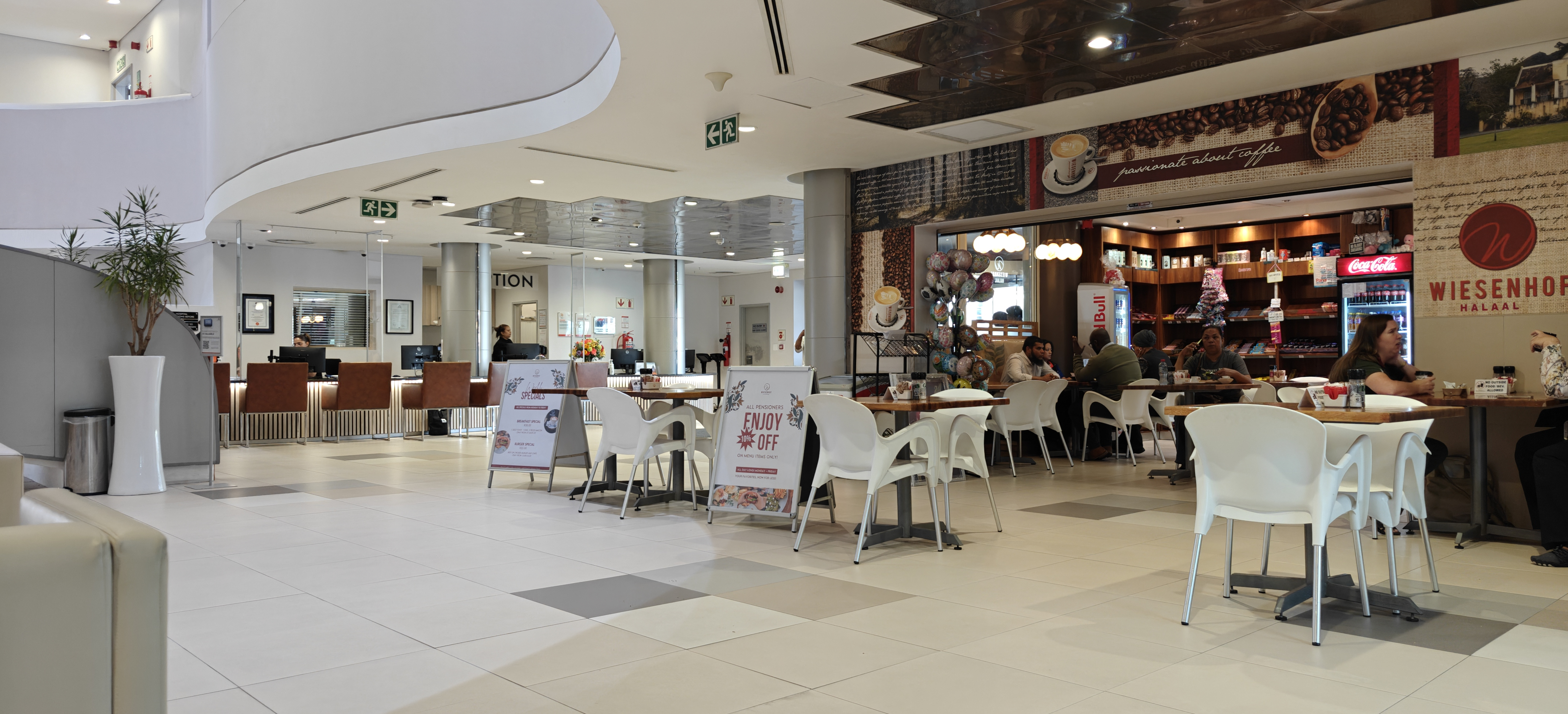
Ground floor area at entrance of Melomed Tokai Private Hospital in Tokai, Cape Town

Melomed (officially Melomed Hospital Holdings) is a South African private hospital group. Founded in 1989, the company is headquartered in Cape Town. It is one of the largest private hospital groups in the Western Cape.

== History ==
Melomed was founded in 1989, by Ebrahim Bhorat, who, as of 2025, was serving as the group's Chairman.

The company opened its Gatesville Medical Center in Athlone, in 1989.

In 1997, Melomed expanded further, with a focus on the Cape Flats region of Cape Town, by acquiring an existing hospital in Mitchells Plain.

In 2004, Melomed acquired the derelict Jan S Marais Hospital in Bellville, and relocated it to a new, multi-disciplinary facility in 2009.

Melomed established the Melomed Office Park, where its headquarters are located, in the commercial part of Kenilworth, in 2012.

The group expanded by opening Melomed Claremont, Melomed Tokai, and Melomed Richards Bay in 2014, 2016, and 2018 respectively.

In 2021, Melomed's Gatesville hospital began offering COVID-19 vaccinations to healthcare professionals, and became the first private hospital in South Africa to do so.

In April 2025, Melomed's Richards Bay hospital was awarded second place in the Best Hospital category of the 2024/25 Best of Zululand Awards, which is focused on the Zululand District Municipality in KwaZulu-Natal.

== Operations ==
Melomed operates 6 private hospitals in South Africa, with 5 located in Cape Town, and 1 in Richards Bay.

Unlike other major South African private healthcare companies, such as Mediclinic Group, Netcare, and Life Healthcare Group, Melomed is not a public company, and is therefore not listed on the JSE like its direct competitors.

== Corporate social responsibility ==
Melomed has focused on opening hospitals in low-income areas, especially in the Cape Flats region of Cape Town. This region houses many people who were forcibly removed from homes in more desirable parts of Cape Town, during apartheid, as part of the then-government's system of spatial planning. The group has specifically positioned hospitals in these communities to benefit their residents, improve private healthcare access, and create a more equitable society.

The group operates quarterly support groups, which are available to the public. These support groups have the aim of providing vital support and education to local communities.

As part of recruitment and education initiatives, Melomed has attended the Youth in Action Expo at the CTICC, and has hosted a Career Day for grade 11 and 12 students, in celebration of Youth Day, at its Melomed Mitchells Plain Hospital.

Melomed has also offered free health screenings to all members of the public at certain of its facilities, as well as a pap smear drive during Women’s Month.

== Controversy ==
In January 2025, the South African Municipal Workers Union Medical Scheme (SAMWUMED) announced that Melomed had been excluded as one of its service providers, with immediate effect. SAMWUMED did not provide a reason for the decision. This followed Melomed having provided services to SAMWUMED members for over 20 years.

A representative from Melomed said that the decision disregarded the socio-economic situation of SAMWUMED members residing in the Cape Flats, who would now have to be directed to facilities outside their areas of residence, creating transportation and other challenges for them. Melomed also criticized SAMWUMED for not updating its website and brochures, or informing its members of the change, and said that the decision was directly counter to ensuring equitable healthcare access.

SAMWUMED said that a new hospital network had already been put in place, effective as of 1 January 2025, and that it was initiating a member communications drive to inform its clients of the change. The NHN criticized the development between SAMWUMED and Melomed Hospitals, and said that Melomed rates were the lowest in the market for SAMWUMED members. The NHN further stated that SAMWUMED members would be exposed to large medical co-payments as a result of the change, and that thousands of Melomed staff members, who resided in the Cape Flats, would be adversely affected as well.

In January 2026, Melomed launched an application in the South Gauteng High Court in Johannesburg accusing SAMWUMED of ignoring a previous court order, in a continuation of 2025 legal events between the two entities. The application was scheduled to be heard on 27 January 2026.
