= Zonnebloem =

Suburb of Cape Town, in Western Cape, South Africa

Zonnebloem Kanaladorp
- District Six
- Interactive map of Zonnebloem
- Coordinates: 33.931°S 18.433°E
- Country: South Africa
- Province: Western Cape
- Municipality: City of Cape Town
- Main Place: Cape Town

Area
  - Total: 1.42 km^{2} (0.55 sq mi)

Population (2011)
  - Total: 5,122
  - Density: 3,610/km^{2} (9,340/sq mi)

Racial makeup (2011)
  - Black African: 39.4%
  - Coloured: 31.4%
  - Indian/Asian: 2.2%
  - White: 19.6%
  - Other: 7.4%

First languages (2011)
  - English: 47.1%
  - Afrikaans: 26.6%
  - Xhosa: 8.5%
  - Zulu: 1.6%
  - Other: 16.2%
- Time zone: UTC+2 (SAST)
- Postal code (street): 7925

Zonnebloem (Dutch for sunflower) is a suburb in the City of Cape Town metropolitan municipality in the Western Cape province of South Africa, previously part of District Six.

It was a farming estate until the early 19th century, when it became a suburb of Cape Town as the population and city boundaries grew. Zonnebloem became a home to freed slaves, merchants, labourers and immigrants. During apartheid, the area of District Six was declared a white-only area and the previous residents were forcefully evicted under the Group Areas Act of the apartheid regime.

The suburb hosts the District Six Campus of the Cape Peninsula University of Technology.

On 17 December 2019, the Minister of Arts and Culture, Nathi Mthethwa, gazetted the renaming of Zonnebloem to District Six after the District Six Museum launched a campaign earlier that year to have the old name brought back and some residents applied to the South African Geographical Names Council in 2018 for the same.
