= Rosebank, Cape Town =

Rosebank
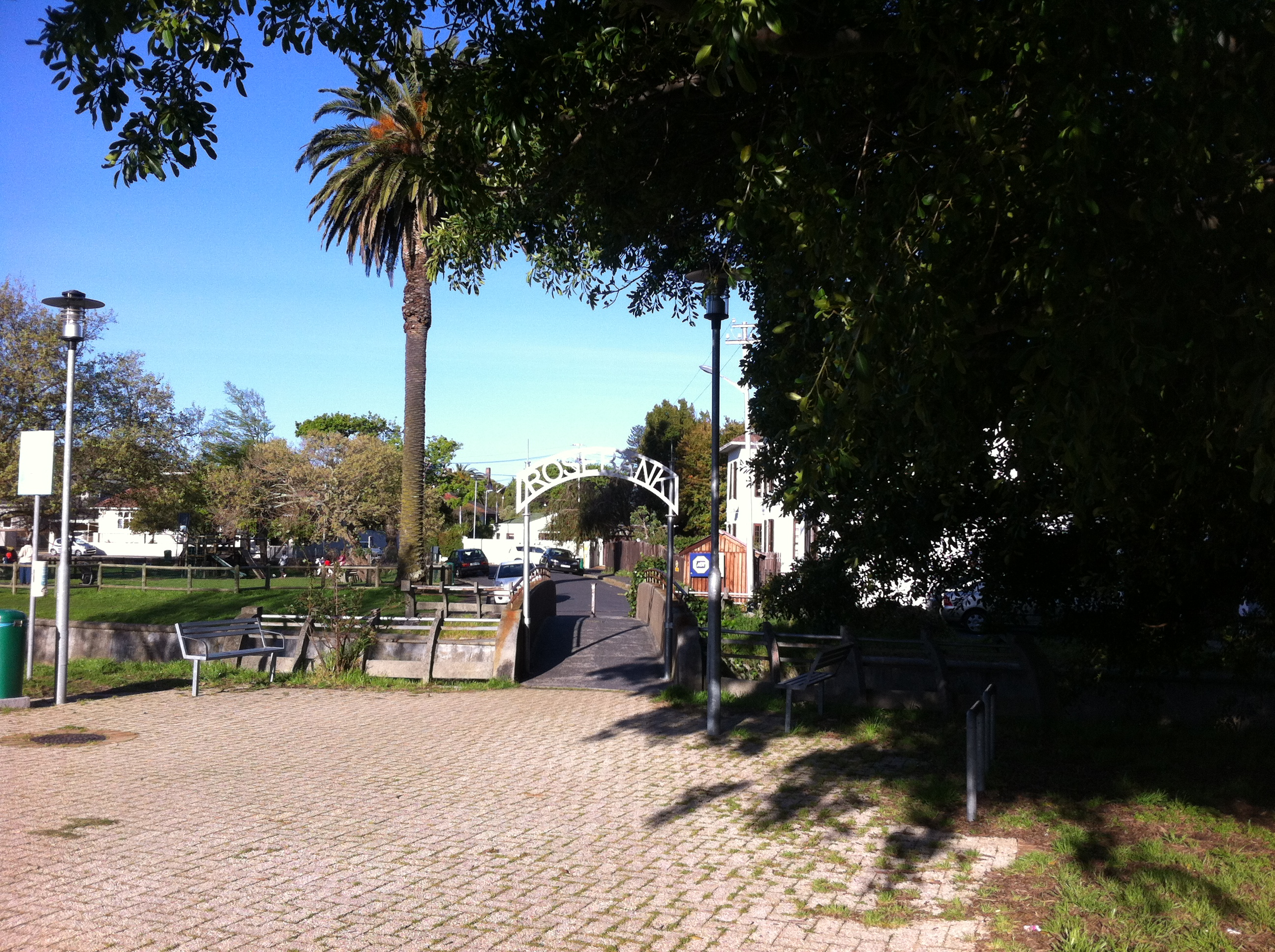
- Pedestrian bridge in Rosebank

- Street map of Rosebank

- Location within Western Cape Location within South Africa
- Coordinates: 33°57′20″S 18°28′27″E
- Country: South Africa
- Province: Western Cape
- Municipality: City of Cape Town

Area
  - Total: 1.10 km^{2} (0.42 sq mi)

Population (2011)
  - Total: 4,963
  - Density: 4,510/km^{2} (11,700/sq mi)

Racial makeup (2011)
  - Black African: 44.8%
  - Coloured: 8.7%
  - Indian/Asian: 5.5%
  - White: 37.9%
  - Other: 3.1%

First languages (2011)
  - English: 64.7%
  - Afrikaans: 9.3%
  - Xhosa: 5.7%
  - Zulu: 2.4%
  - Other: 17.9%
- Time zone: UTC+2 (SAST)
- Postal code (street): 7700
- Area code: (021) 685

Rosebank is one of the Southern Suburbs of Cape Town, South Africa, located between the suburbs of Mowbray and Rondebosch.

== Geography ==
Rosebank is located on the lower eastern slope of Devil's Peak, stretching down to the Liesbeeck River, and on the other side of the river up to the edge of Rondebosch Common. On the west it is bounded by the M3 freeway. The historic Mostert's Mill is located just next to the freeway. Much of the land between the M3 and Main Road, which runs north-south through the suburb, belongs to the University of Cape Town and is used for residences and sports fields. The area around Main Road is a mixture of university residences, shops and blocks of flats.

Parallel to Main Road, and one block east from it, the Metrorail Southern Line divides Rosebank in half; Rosebank railway station is the main public transport facility in the suburb. There are no road crossings of the railway in Rosebank; the nearest are the Durban Road bridge in Mowbray to the north and the Belmont Road bridge in Rondebosch to the south. There are, however, several pedestrian subways under the railway.

The area east of the railway, as far as Liesbeek Parkway, contains a mixture of blocks of flats and detached houses; many of the residences in this area are occupied by students from the university. The Cape Town offices of the Council for Scientific and Industrial Research and the South African Bureau of Standards are also located here. Liesbeek Parkway is a dual carriageway which runs north-south through the suburb, running mostly parallel to the Liesbeeck River. East of Liesbeek Parkway and the river is an area of larger houses, with a more affluent population. Also located in this area is Rustenburg Girls' High School.

== Population ==
According to the 2011 Census, the population of Rosebank consisted of 4,963 people in 1,343 households. 45% of the population described themselves as "Black African", 38% as "White", 9% as "Coloured" and 6% as "Indian or Asian". Of those who were asked about their first language (which excluded those in university residences), 65% spoke English, 9% spoke Afrikaans and 6% spoke isiZulu. Notably, 12% spoke a language that was not one of South Africa's 11 official languages. 50% of residents of the suburb live in institutions (principally university residences), 30% live in flats, and 19% live in houses. Over 99% of residents had mains electricity, piped drinking water, a flush toilet and regular refuse collection.

== Notable residents ==
- Helen Zille, politician and provincial premier, lives in Rosebank.
