= Diep River, Cape Town =

Diep River
- Interactive map of Diep River
- Coordinates: 34°2′3″S 18°27′52″E
- Country: South Africa
- Province: Western Cape
- Municipality: City of Cape Town
- Main Place: Cape Town

Area
  - Total: 0.75 km^{2} (0.29 sq mi)

Population (2011)
  - Total: 2,515
  - Density: 3,400/km^{2} (8,700/sq mi)

Racial makeup (2011)
  - Black African: 11.8%
  - Coloured: 24.8%
  - Indian/Asian: 0.7%
  - White: 60.2%
  - Other: 2.4%

First languages (2011)
  - English: 82.3%
  - Afrikaans: 9.7%
  - Xhosa: 1.0%
  - Other: 6.9%
- Time zone: UTC+2 (SAST)
- Postal code (street): 7800, 7945

Diep River is a suburb in Cape Town, South Africa, named after the Diep River that runs through the area. The suburb is bordered by Heathfield to the south and Plumstead to the north. Diep River railway station is on the main line from Cape Town to Simon's Town.
