= Heathfield, Cape Town =

Heathfield
- Interactive map of Heathfield
- Coordinates: 34°02′55″S 18°28′07″E
- Country: South Africa
- Province: Western Cape
- Municipality: City of Cape Town
- Main Place: Cape Town

Government
  - Councillor: Denis Joseph (Ward 71) (DA); Johannes Burger (Ward 72) (DA)

Area
  - Total: 1.11 km^{2} (0.43 sq mi)

Population (2011)
  - Total: 4,649
  - Density: 4,190/km^{2} (10,800/sq mi)

Racial makeup (2011)
  - Black African: 11.8%
  - Coloured: 65.1%
  - Indian/Asian: 1.3%
  - White: 20.7%
  - Other: 1.0%

First languages (2011)
  - English: 83.0%
  - Afrikaans: 9.9%
  - Other: 7.1%
- Time zone: UTC+2 (SAST)
- Postal code (street): 7945

Heathfield is a suburb in Cape Town, South Africa.

== Overview ==
Heathfield is bordered by Retreat to the south and Diep River to the north, and was named for the many varieties of heath that grew and still grow there. It is situated on the Cape Flats, a large area of unconsolidated sand.

Heathfield railway station (opened in 1913 to assist passengers on the interchange of the line to Ottery) is on the main line from Cape Town to Simon's Town.

Main Road (which runs from Central Cape Town through to Simon's Town) runs along the west of Heathfield. It is close to Bergvliet High School and Zwaanswyk High School.
