= Tokai, Cape Town =

Tokai
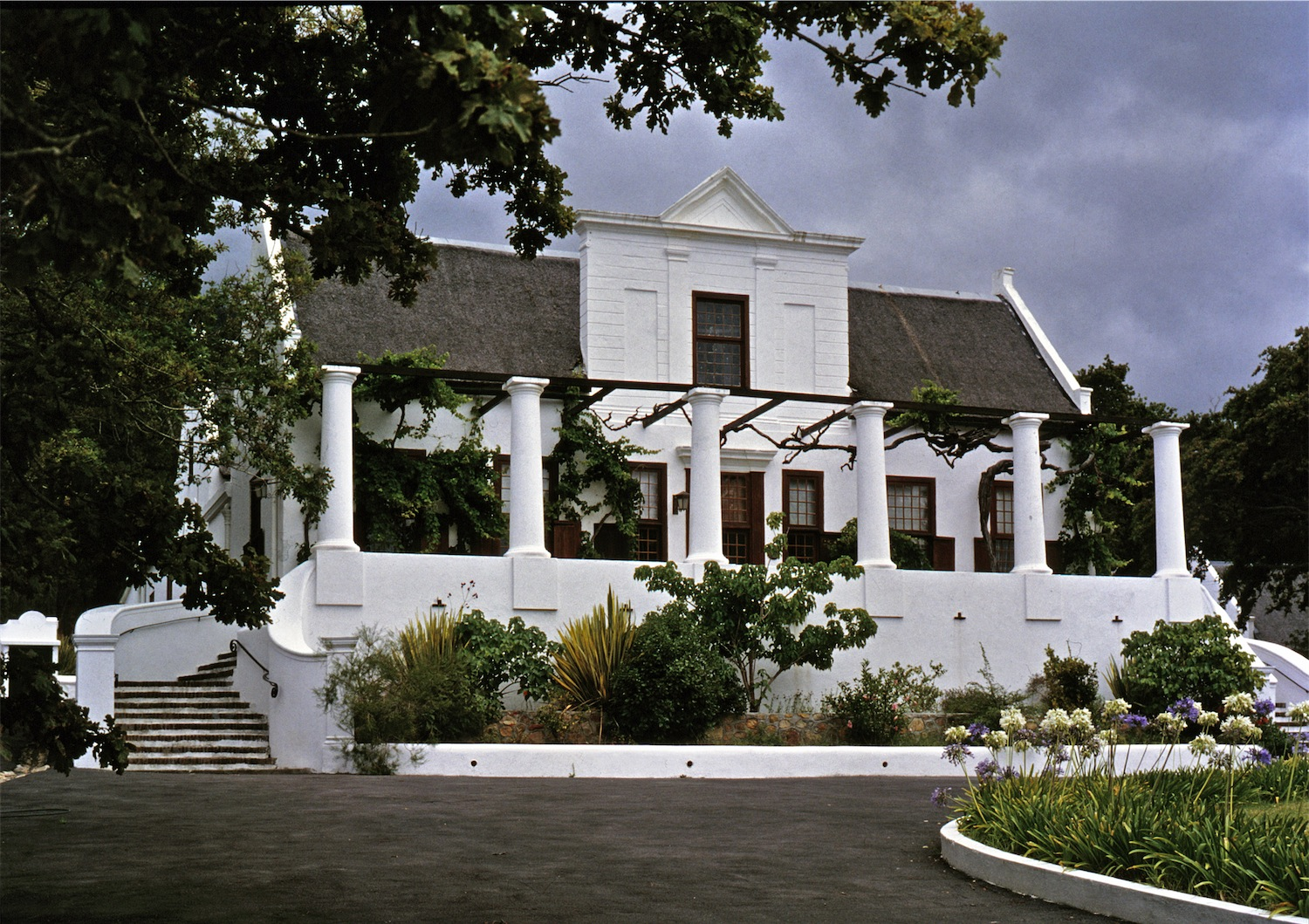
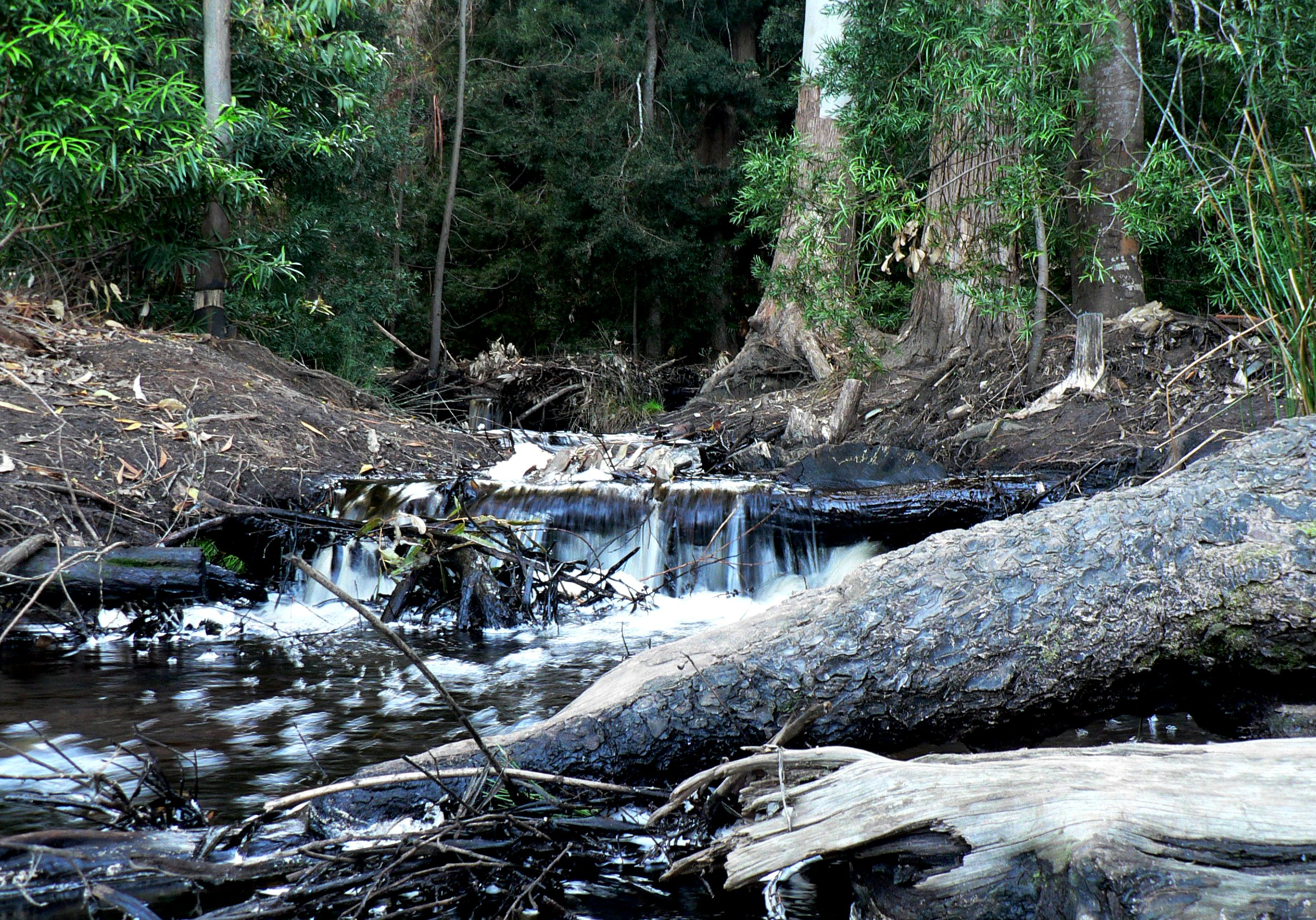
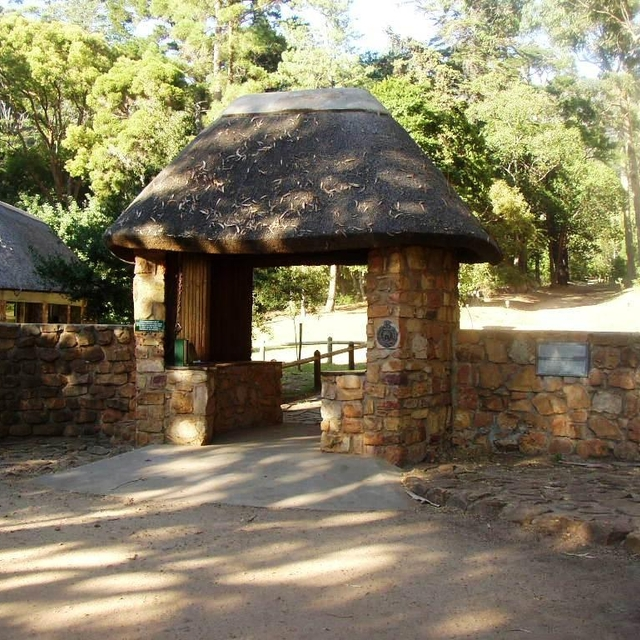
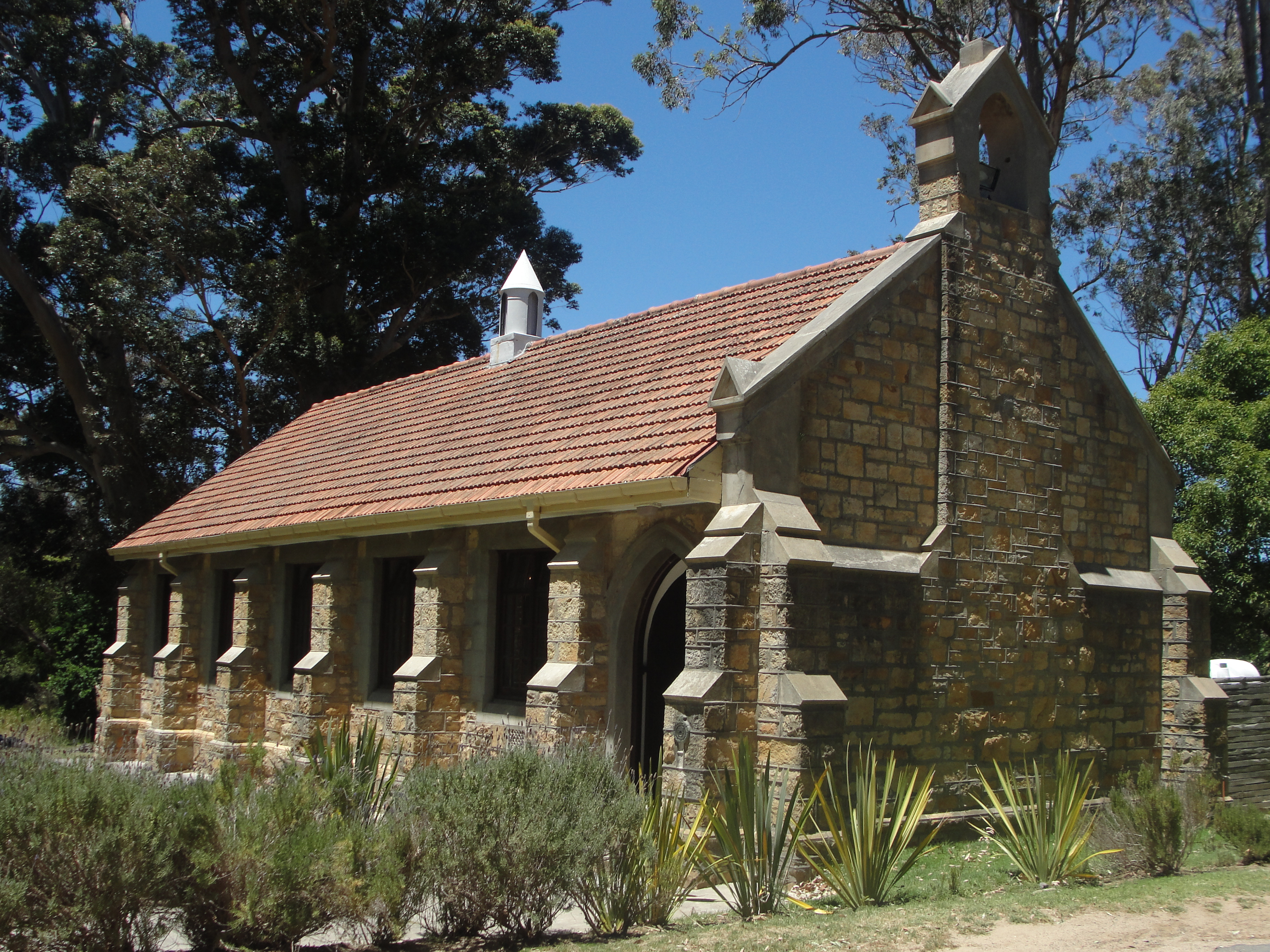
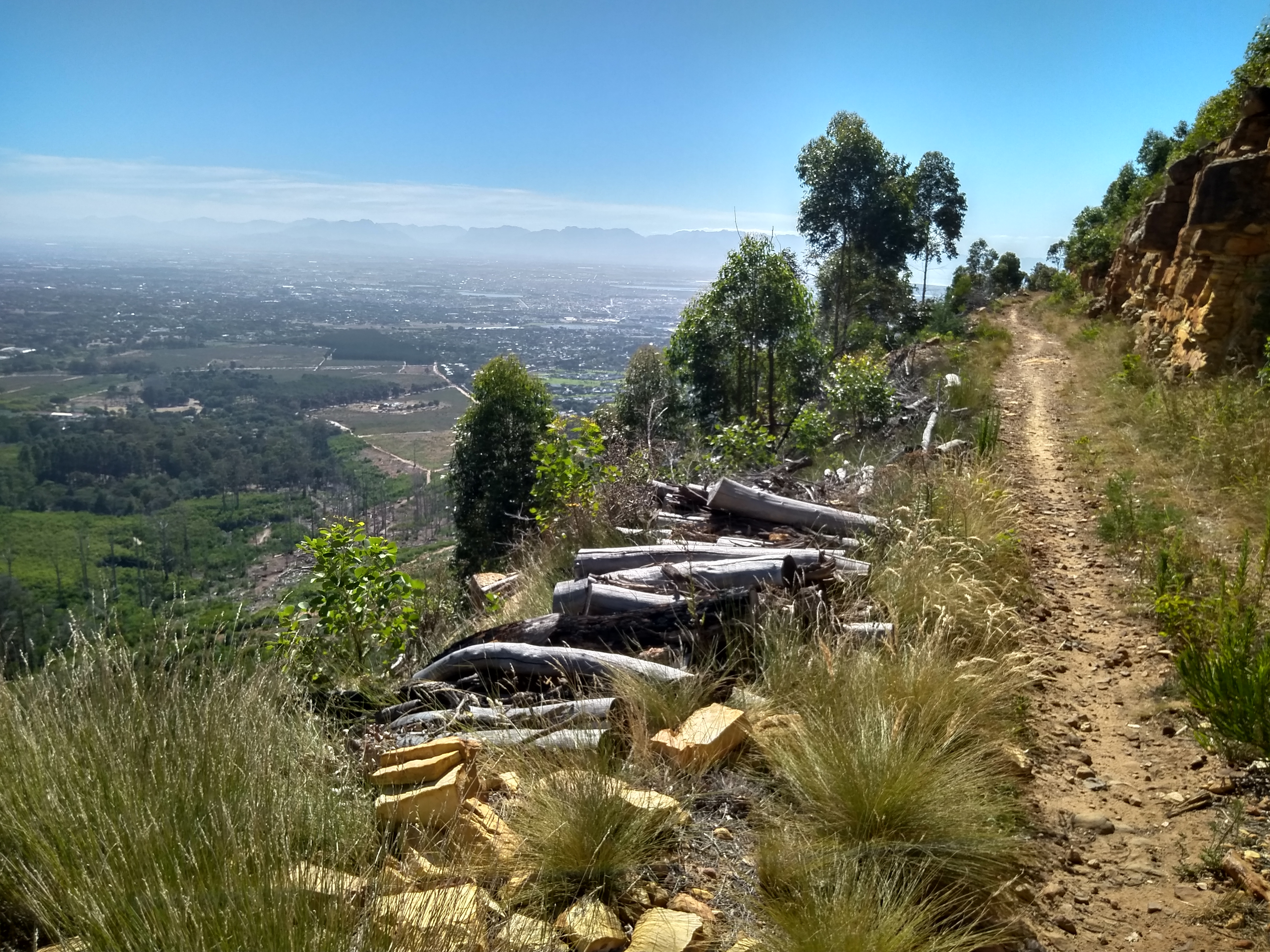
- From top left, Historic Tokai manor house and vineyard. Trees in the Tokai Arboretum (top right). Entrance to the Tokai Arboretum (centre). Historic stone chapel (bottom left). View over Tokai from a local mountain biking track (bottom right).
- Interactive map of Tokai
- Coordinates: 34°3′45″S 18°26′30″E
- Country: South Africa
- Province: Western Cape
- Municipality: City of Cape Town
- Main Place: Cape Town

Area
  - Total: 1.05 km^{2} (0.41 sq mi)

Population (2011)
  - Total: 2,568
  - Density: 2,450/km^{2} (6,330/sq mi)

Racial makeup (2011)
  - Black African: 10.2%
  - Coloured: 3.8%
  - Indian/Asian: 0.7%
  - White: 82.2%
  - Other: 3.0%

First languages (2011)
  - English: 92.6%
  - Afrikaans: 4.4%
  - Other: 3.1%
- Time zone: UTC+2 (SAST)
- Postal code (street): 7945
- PO box: 7966
- Area code: 021

Tokai, is a small, affluent residential suburb of Cape Town, South Africa. It is situated on the foothills of the Constantiaberg, (a large whaleback shaped mountain in the Table Mountain range). The neighborhood is bordered by Dennendal to the north, Steenberg to the west, Kirstenhof to the south, and Bergvliet to the east, and is part of the Southern Suburbs of Cape Town.

Tokai's property prices are high within the context of the Cape Town real estate market, with the average detached house price in the suburb sitting at R7.21 million as at May 2025. The area is one of the more desirable among residents of Cape Town, and is known for its laid-back, peaceful lifestyle and easy access to major transit routes, amenities, beaches, and nature trails.

== History ==
In 1791 or 1792, governor Johan Isaac Rhenius bestowed the area of Tokai to Johannes Rauk, a colonist born in Narva, Estonia, who became one of the first farmers in the Dutch Cape Colony.

Tokai, named after Tokaj, a range of hills in Hungary, was originally an open area with various wine farms and smallholdings. Today, though most of the wine farms are no longer there, there are still a few old Cape Dutch houses like those found in Constantia.

The suburb was built in the late 1940s, and was built quickly because of the urgent need for housing for predominantly white, English-speaking South African soldiers returning from World War II.

== Scenery and surroundings ==
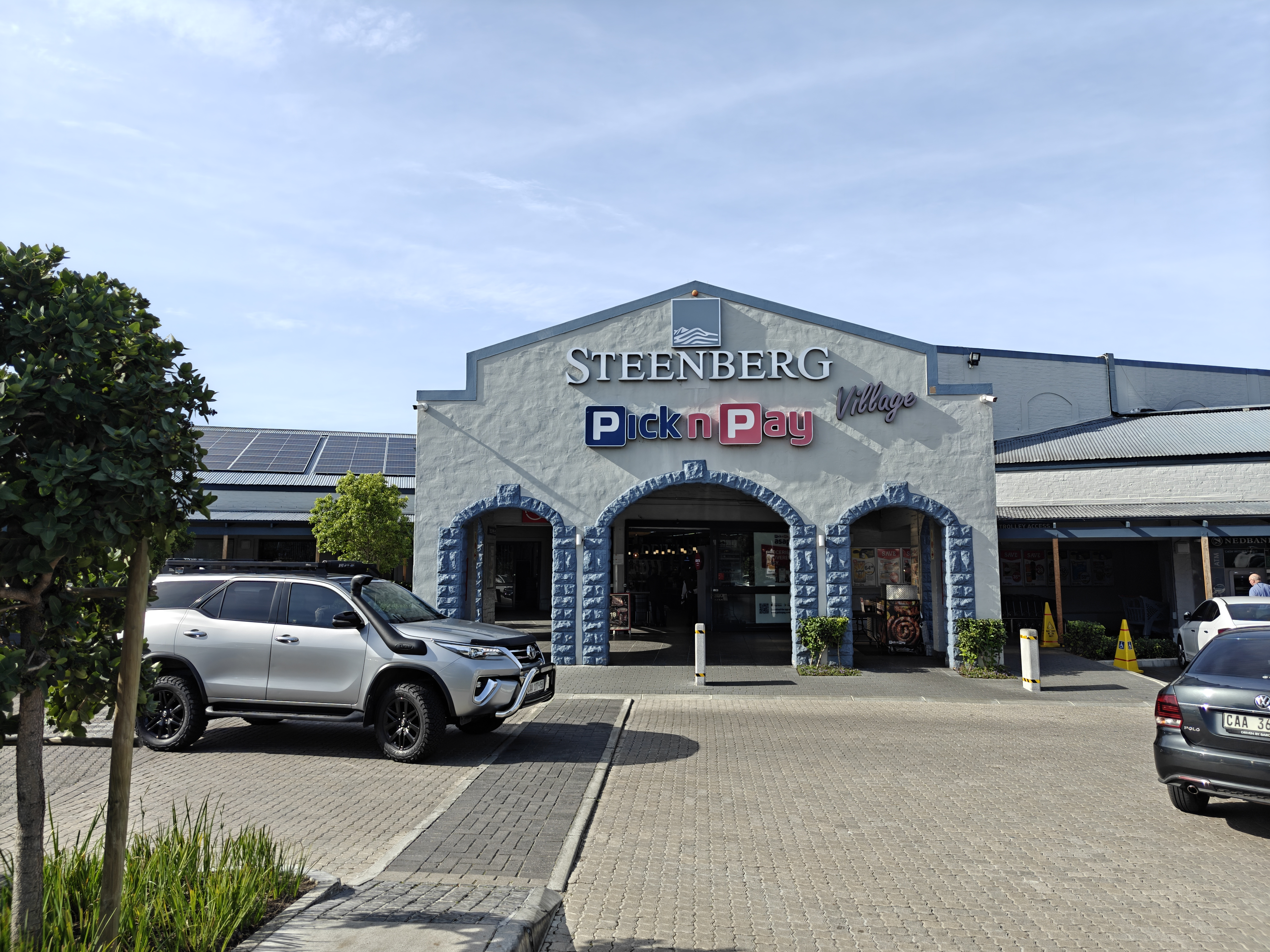
Steenberg Village shopping center in Tokai

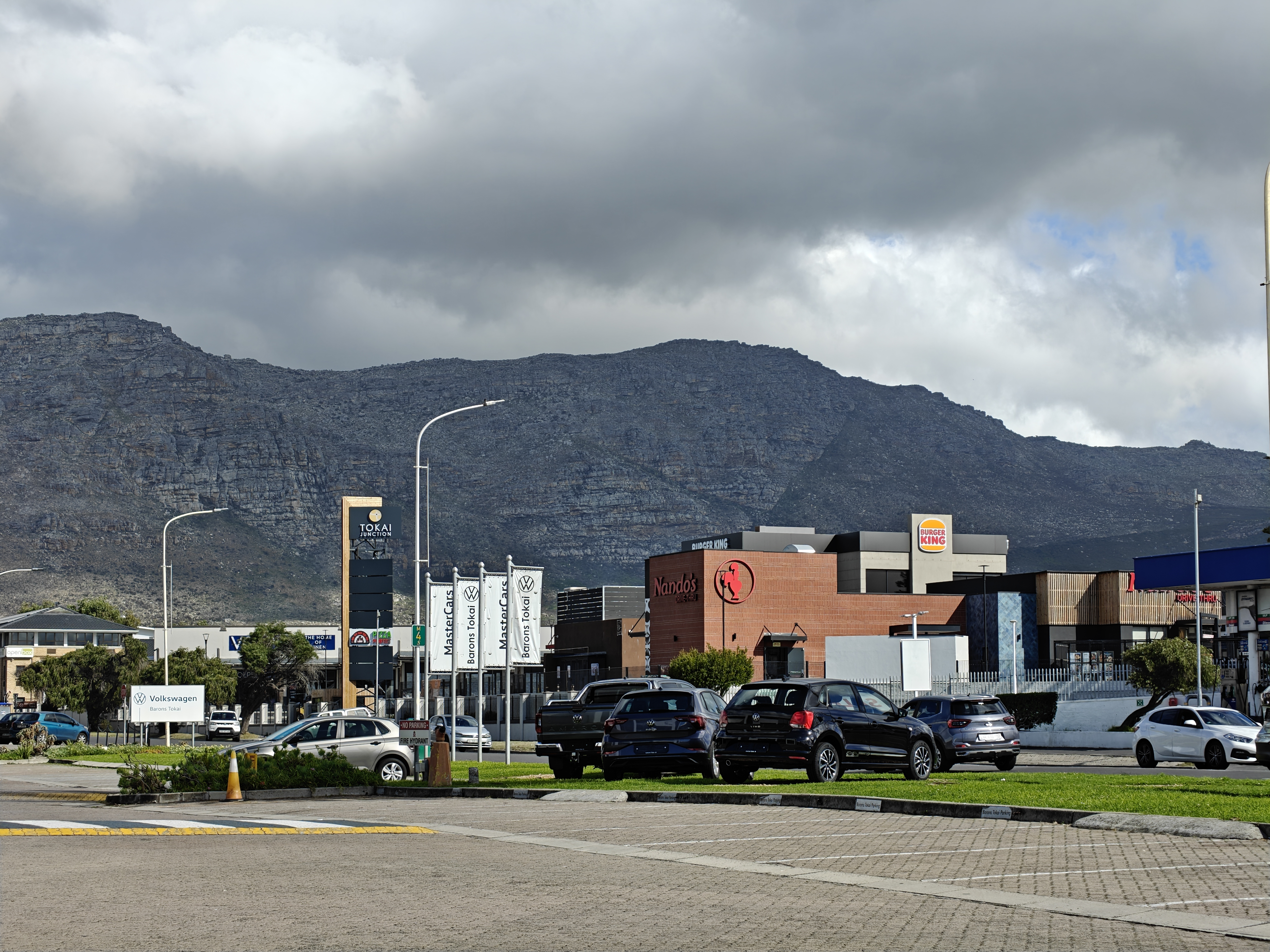
View of Silvermine Nature Reserve mountains from Tokai

Some of Tokai's roads are paved with red brick. Streams run through Tokai and the pine plantations, forming green belts where various bird, frog, and insect species make their home. These green belts also provide areas for recreation including walking, cycling and dog walking. The once extensive pine plantations were, until recently, regarded as a prime spot to observe predatory birds, including hawks, buzzards, owls and certain eagle species.

Tokai is the only sustainably large area that Cape Flats Sand Fynbos, an endangered vegetation type, can be found in. Work is under way to provide it with long-term protection.

In 2018, the Norval Art Foundation was opened close to Steenberg Wine Estate. The Foundation houses unique art works from the collection of the Norval family.

Nearby is Pollsmoor Prison, where Nelson Mandela and other political prisoners were incarcerated by the Apartheid regime. Mandela was there for four years (1984 to 1988) after his transfer from Robben Island, before moving on to Victor Verster Prison until his release on 11 February 1990.

== Leisure ==
Tokai contains numerous nature-related sites for residents and visitors to enjoy. The area is known for its peaceful, tree-lined streets, parkland, and forested areas, with nature trails. It provides residents with easy access to the False Bay area, via both Ou Kaapse Weg and Boyes Drive.

The suburb is also next to the Steenberg Golf Estate, and is close to the Westlake Sports Facility, Steenberg Virgin Active gym, Norval Foundation art museum, Steenberg Vineyards (wine farm), Tokai Picnic Area, Tokai Arboretum, Upper and Lower Tokai Park, The Range Conference Center, and the Constantia Wine Valley.

== Commerce ==
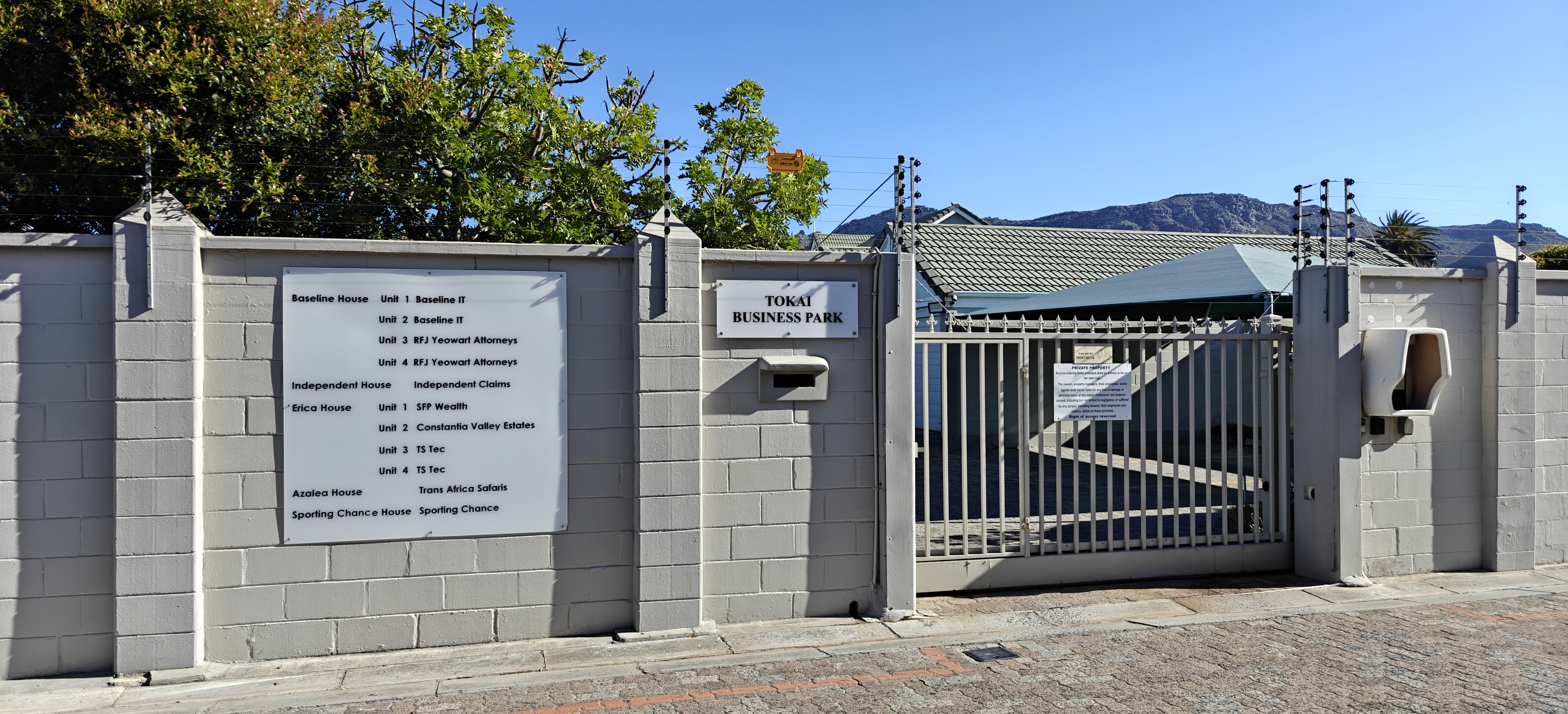
Tokai Business Park

Tokai is home or close to numerous shopping centers and malls, including Blue Route Mall, Steenberg Village, South Palms Center, Tokai Junction, and Tokai on Main, as well as a garden center (Super Plants Tokai), and numerous restaurants and take-out locations.

The area also houses the Melomed Tokai private hospital, and the Netcare Medicross Tokai private clinic. Tokai is located close to two commercial nodes - Steenberg Office Park and Westlake Business Park.

== Governance ==
The Tokai Residents' Association (TRA) is a registered non-profit, established in the late 1900s, to monitor and protect the interests of the area's residents, and to help maintain the quality and safety of the area. The TRA represents the Tokai community on a range of local issues, consults with organizations and institutions including the City of Cape Town, property developers, the Cape Town Liquor Board, and City planners.

Tokai is governed by an elected Ward Councilor, who, as of 2025, was Carolynne Victoria Franklin of the Democratic Alliance.

== Notable residents ==
- Gerald Morkel, politician and Premier of the Western Cape.

== See also ==
- Tokai Arboretum
