= Geraldine Fraser-Moleketi =

South African politician (born 1960)

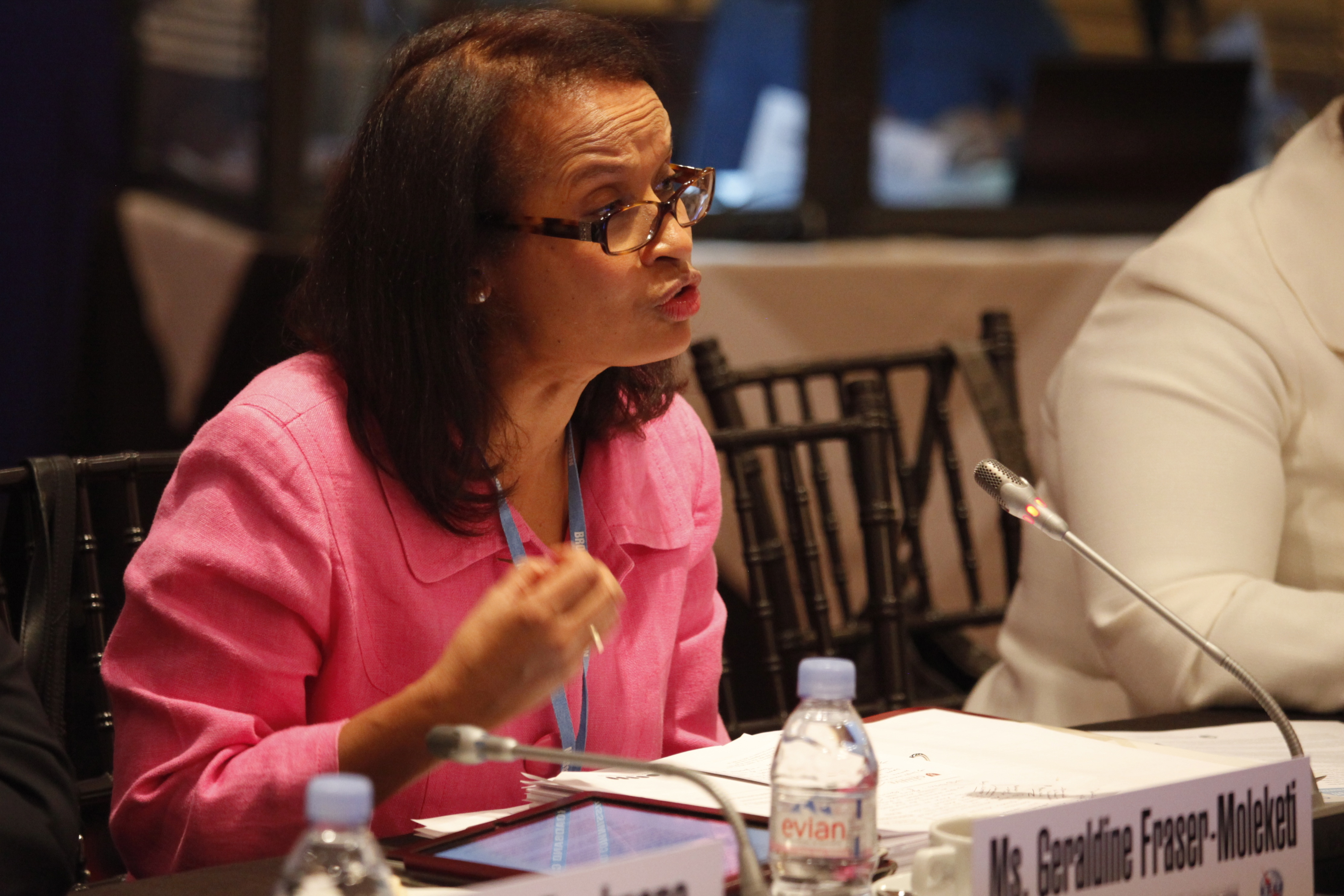
- Fraser-Moleketi in 2013

Minister of Public Service and Administration
- In office 17 June 1999 – 25 September 2008
- President: Thabo Mbeki
- Preceded by: Zola Skweyiya
- Succeeded by: Richard Baloyi

Minister of Welfare and Population Development
- In office 1 July 1996 – 16 June 1999
- President: Nelson Mandela
- Preceded by: Patrick McKenzie
- Succeeded by: Zola Skweyiya

Deputy Minister of Welfare and Population Development
- In office February 1995 – 30 June 1996
- President: Nelson Mandela
- Minister: Abe Williams; Patrick McKenzie

Member of the National Assembly
- In office 9 May 1994 – 25 September 2008

Deputy Chairperson of the South African Communist Party
- In office 2 July 1998 – 26 July 2002
- General Secretary: Blade Nzimande
- Chairperson: Charles Nqakula
- Preceded by: Position established
- Succeeded by: Dipuo Mvelase

Personal details
- Born: Geraldine Joslyn Fraser; 24 August 1960 (age 65) Lansdowne, Cape Town; Cape Province, Union of South Africa
- Party: African National Congress
- Other political affiliations: South African Communist Party
- Spouse: Jabu Moleketi (m. 1983)
- Relations: Arthur Fraser (brother)
- Education: Livingstone High School
- Alma mater: University of Pretoria

Geraldine Joslyn Fraser-Moleketi (née Fraser; born 24 August 1960) is a South African politician who was the Minister of Public Service and Administration from June 1999 to September 2008. Before that, from July 1996 to June 1999, she was Minister of Welfare and Population Development. She represented the African National Congress (ANC) in the National Assembly from 1994 to 2008 and is a former deputy chairperson of the South African Communist Party (SACP).

Born in Cape Town, Fraser-Moleketi joined the exiled anti-apartheid movement in the Frontline States in 1980, becoming a member of the ANC and SACP. She returned to South Africa during the negotiations to end apartheid in July 1990, ahead of the SACP's internal relaunch, and worked at the party's headquarters until the April 1994 general election, when she was elected to represent the ANC in the first post-apartheid Parliament. After less than a year as a backbencher, she was appointed to the Government of National Unity as Deputy Minister of Welfare and Population Development in February 1995; in July 1996, President Nelson Mandela promoted her to minister in the same portfolio.

After the 1999 general election, newly elected President Thabo Mbeki appointed her as Minister of Public Service and Administration, where she served for the duration of Mbeki's presidency. She was best known for taking a hard-line stance during public sector wage negotiations, leading to deteriorating labour relations and public sector strikes in 1999, 2004, and 2007. For this, she became a bête noire of the left wing of the Congress of South African Trade Unions and SACP, the ANC's Tripartite Alliance partners, though she was herself a member of the SACP Central Committee between 1990 and 2002, including as deputy chairperson of the party from 1998 to 2002. She was also a member of the ANC National Executive Committee between 1997 and 2007.

On 25 September 2008, Fraser-Moleketi resigned from the cabinet and from the National Assembly in response to Mbeki's resignation from the Presidency. After leaving legislative politics, she was director for democratic governance at the United Nations Development Programme from 2009 to 2013 and then vice-president and special envoy on gender at the African Development Bank from 2013 to 2016. She served multiple terms on the United Nations Committee of Experts on Public Administration, and she has been the chancellor of the Nelson Mandela University since April 2018.

== Early life and education ==
Fraser-Moleketi was born on 24 August 1960 in Lansdowne, a suburb of Cape Town. Her parents later moved to Faure, where her father was principal of the state children's home; during the week, she lived with her grandmother in Crossroads on the Cape Flats, in order to attend Livingstone High School in Claremont, Cape Town. She became politically active during this period, serving on the school's student representative council and participating in Marxist reading groups. She matriculated in 1978 and studied towards a diploma in education at the University of the Western Cape before her studies were interrupted by her anti-apartheid activism.

After the end of apartheid, she completed a Master's in public administration at the University of Pretoria, gaining admission on the basis of recognition of prior learning. She graduated in 2006 with a thesis about public service reform in South Africa.

== Anti-apartheid activism ==
In 1980, Fraser-Moleketi dropped out of her second year of university and, with four other women, crossed the South African border into exile in the Frontline States, where she joined the African National Congress (ANC) and South African Communist Party (SACP). Her first post was in Zimbabwe, where she worked under Joe Gqabi. After Gqabi was assassinated in 1981, Zimbabwean authorities detained and questioned her. She received military training with Umkhonto we Sizwe in Angola, and she later attended specialised military courses in the Soviet Union (between 1982 and 1983) and Cuba (in 1989). However, she spent most of her time in exile in Zambia. From 1986 to 1990, she was seconded to work for the Lutheran World Federation.

In July 1990, during the negotiations to end apartheid, she returned to South Africa at the request of the SACP to prepare for the national relaunch of the party, which had recently been unbanned. She was elected to the SACP Central Committee later the same year. From then until the end of 1992, she served as an SACP national administrator and as personal assistant in the office of the SACP general secretary, first under Joe Slovo and then under Chris Hani. She was also on the management committee of the Convention for a Democratic South Africa as technical support to the SACP general secretary. In September 1993, she was appointed as deputy elections coordinator for the ANC ahead of the upcoming April 1994 general election.

== Mandela presidency: 1994–1999 ==
=== Welfare and Population Development ===
In the 1994 election, South Africa's first under universal suffrage, Fraser-Moleketi was elected to represent the ANC in the National Assembly, the lower house of the new South African Parliament. After less than a year as a backbencher, she was appointed to the Government of National Unity in February 1995, named by President Nelson Mandela as Deputy Minister of Welfare and Population Development. She deputised Abe Williams and then Patrick McKenzie, both members of the National Party.

In May 1996, Mandela announced a major reshuffle, which would take effect after the National Party's withdrawal from the cabinet on 30 June. Fraser-Moleketi was appointed to succeed McKenzie as Minister of Welfare and Population Development. She remained in that office through the rest of Mandela's presidency, during which time she supported the interdepartmental campaign to consolidate a social wage.

=== Tripartite Alliance ===
During this period, Fraser-Moleketi joined the ANC National Executive Committee; she was elected to her first five-year term at the ANC's 50th National Conference in December 1997, ranked as the 17th-most popular member of the 60-member committee. Controversially, the committee also appointed her to lead an internal task team charged with investigating the actions of the SACP's left wing during the ANC's 50th Conference. Concurrently, she remained on the SACP Central Committee and also served on the party's politburo. On 2 July 1998, at the party's 10th national congress, she was elected as SACP deputy national chairperson, serving under chairperson Charles Nqakula and general secretary Blade Nzimande. She served a single term in the office and did not stand for re-election; Dipuo Mvelase was elected to succeed her at the 11th national congress in Rustenburg on 26 July 2002.

== Mbeki presidency: 1999–2008 ==
=== Public Service and Administration ===
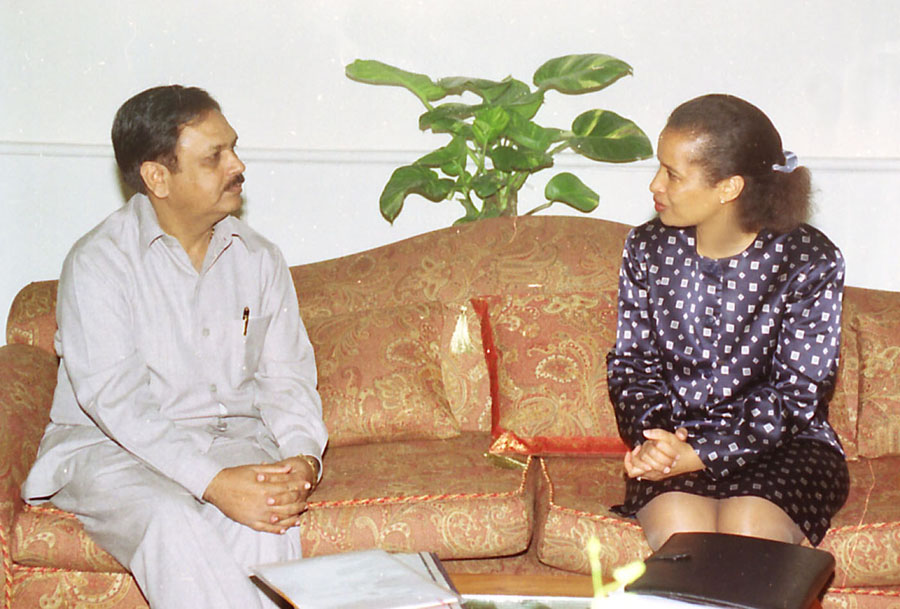
Fraser-Moleketi meets with Suresh Pachouri, the Indian Minister of State for Personnel, in New Delhi, September 2004

After the June 1999 general election, newly elected President Thabo Mbeki appointed Moleketi to his cabinet as Minister of Public Service and Administration. She was reappointed to the position at the outset of Mbeki's second term in April 2004.

According to the Mail & Guardian, her "mandate was clearly to get tough on the public service unions", leading to tensions with the Congress of South African Trade Unions, the ANC and SACP's Tripartite Alliance partner, as well as with her own chief negotiator, Neva Makgetla. Soon after she took office, her ministry entered into a stand-off with the public sector unions when it took a hard line in wage negotiations, with Fraser-Moleketi accusing workers of "pursuing narrow trade unionism to the detriment of broader social transformation" in their reluctance to accept a 6.3 per cent wage increase; three large unions – the National Education, Health and Allied Workers' Union, the South African Democratic Teachers' Union, and the Police and Prisons Civil Rights Union – launched a strike. Public sector wages and labour relations remained a point of contention throughout her tenure in the ministry, and public unions went on strike again in 2004 and in 2007. Fraser-Moleketi personally was an unpopular figure with many unionists and the figurehead for their anger with government; her hardline stance also drew criticism in parts of the SACP.

As part of a bid to resolve the month-long 2007 strike, Fraser-Moleketi introduced the occupation-specific dispensation, which would allow differential pay rises for positions requiring scarce skills, though implementation of the policy subsequently stalled. Other policy initiatives pursued by Fraser-Moleketi included the restructuring and rightsizing of the post-apartheid public sector and the continuation of the Batho Pele (Sesotho for "People First") programme to develop a service-delivery culture in the public service. She was described as "tough-minded", as "hands-on", and, by Ferial Haffajee, as a "live wire clearly at the heart of President Thabo Mbeki's administration", with a fondness for "government-speak". In the international arena, in her capacity as minister, she served on several advisory and governance bodies, notably as a member of the first United Nations (UN) Committee of Experts on Public Administration (CEPA) from 2002 and then as its deputy chairperson from 2006.

=== ANC National Executive Committee ===
In December 2002, Fraser-Moleketi was elected to a second term as a member of the ANC National Executive Committee, ranked 14th of 60 members. However, at the ANC's next national conference in Polokwane in December 2007, she was among the several cabinet members who failed to gain re-election. She also did not seek to return to the SACP Central Committee.

=== Resignation ===
On 23 September 2008, in response to the announcement that the ANC had forced Mbeki to resign from the presidency, Fraser-Moleketi was one of the 11 cabinet ministers who announced their own resignation. ANC secretary-general Gwede Mantashe subsequently said that many of them, including Fraser-Moleketi, had agreed to stay on in the cabinet of Mbeki's successor, Kgalema Motlanthe; however, on 25 September, Fraser-Moleketi's spokesperson said this was "misinformation" and that Fraser-Moleketi's resignation, both from the cabinet and from the National Assembly, would take effect. In a farewell statement, Fraser-Moleketi said that she would always remain a "committed member of the ANC". Richard Baloyi succeeded her as Minister of Public Service and Administration, and Enoch Godongwana filled her seat in Parliament.

== Later career ==
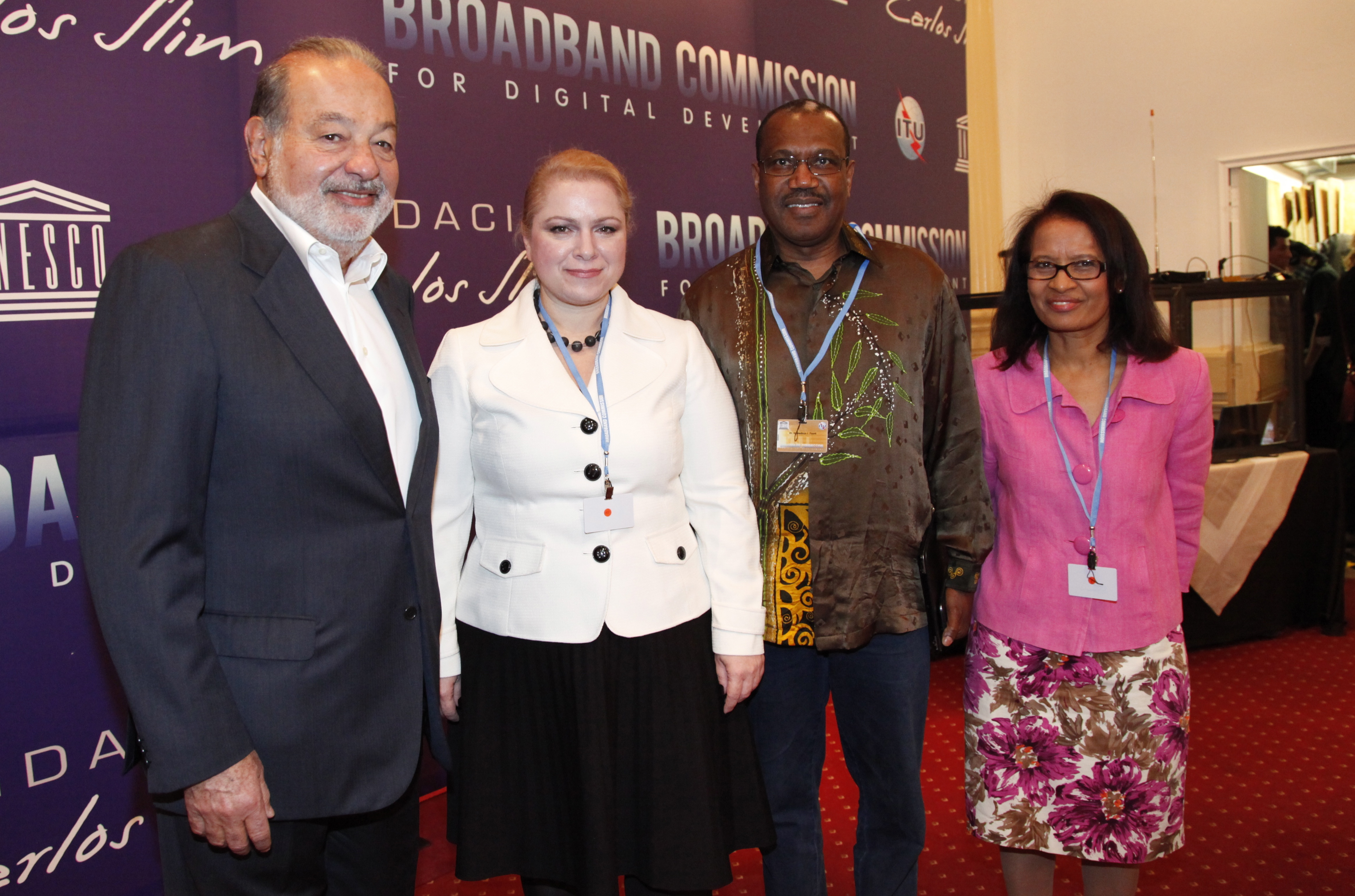
Fraser-Moleketi (far right) with Carlos Slim, Jasna Matic, and Hamadoun Touré at a Broadband Commission meeting in Mexico City, March 2013

On 2 January 2009, Fraser-Moleketi took office as director of the democratic governance programme in the UN Development Programme's Bureau for Development Policy. She held that position until the end of August 2013, when she joined the African Development Bank as vice-president and special envoy on gender until the end of 2016. She returned as a member of UN CEPA from 2018 to 2021, and she acquired several board memberships in business, including as a non-executive director at Standard Bank from November 2016; as independent director at Exxaro since May 2018; and, succeeding Khotso Mokhele, as independent non-executive director and chairman at Tiger Brands from January 2021.

She remained active in the ANC, serving since 2022 as a member of the party's internal disciplinary appeals committee under chairperson Johnny de Lange. As of 2023, she was also the chairperson of the Thabo Mbeki Foundation.

== Personal life ==
In 1983 in Lusaka, Zambia, Fraser-Moleketi married Jabu Moleketi, whom she had met at an ANC military camp in Angola. They have three children. Her younger brother, Arthur Fraser, was a prominent civil servant in the post-apartheid government.

== Honours ==
In March 2016, Fraser-Moleketi was named as New African Woman of the Year, an award sponsored by the African Development Bank. She was awarded honorary doctorates by the Nelson Mandela University, in 2017, and the North-West University, in 2021. On 1 April 2018, she took office as Chancellor of Nelson Mandela University, serving alongside vice-chancellor Sibongile Muthwa. She was appointed to a second term as chancellor in April 2022.
