= Harfield Village =

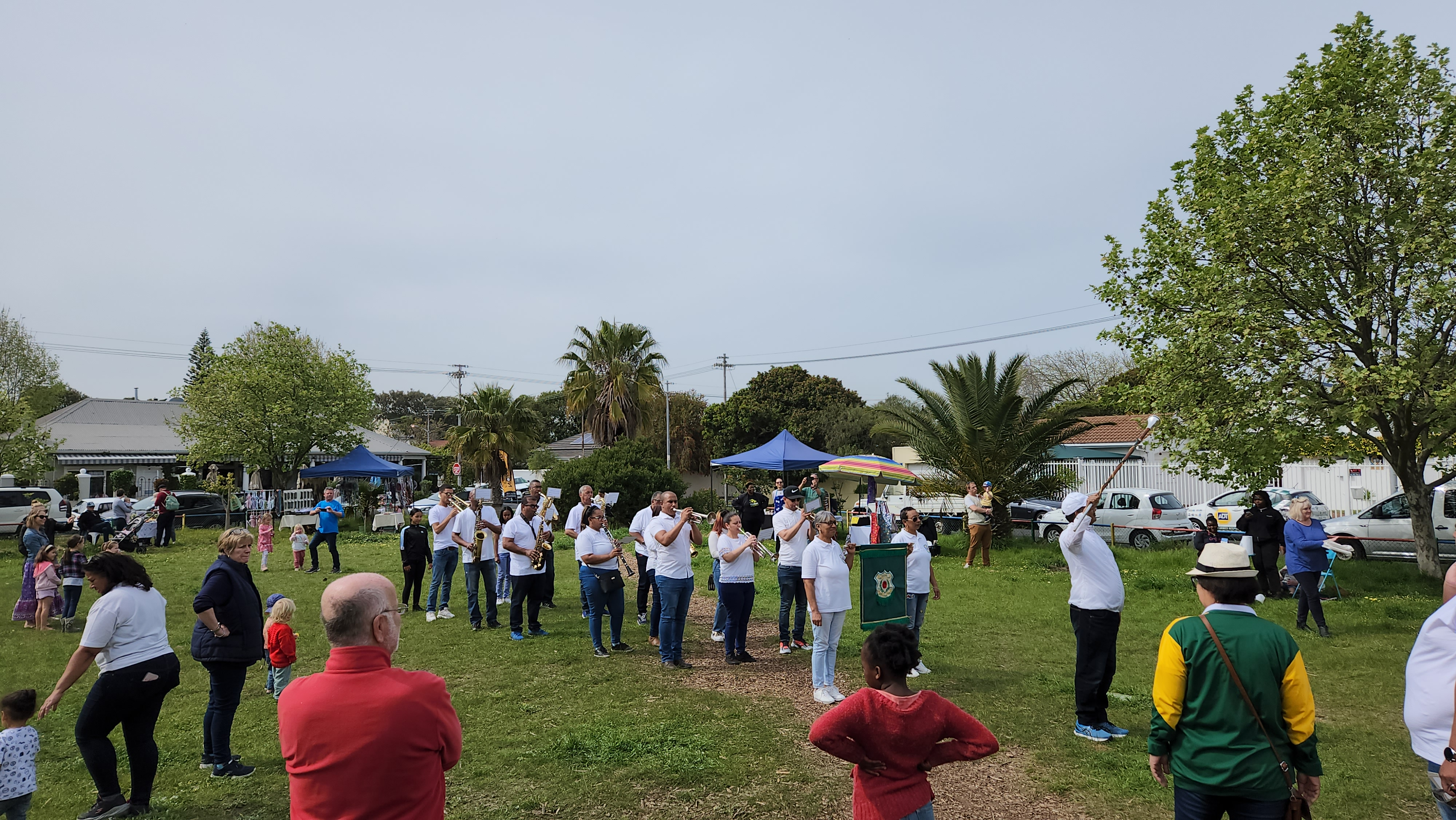
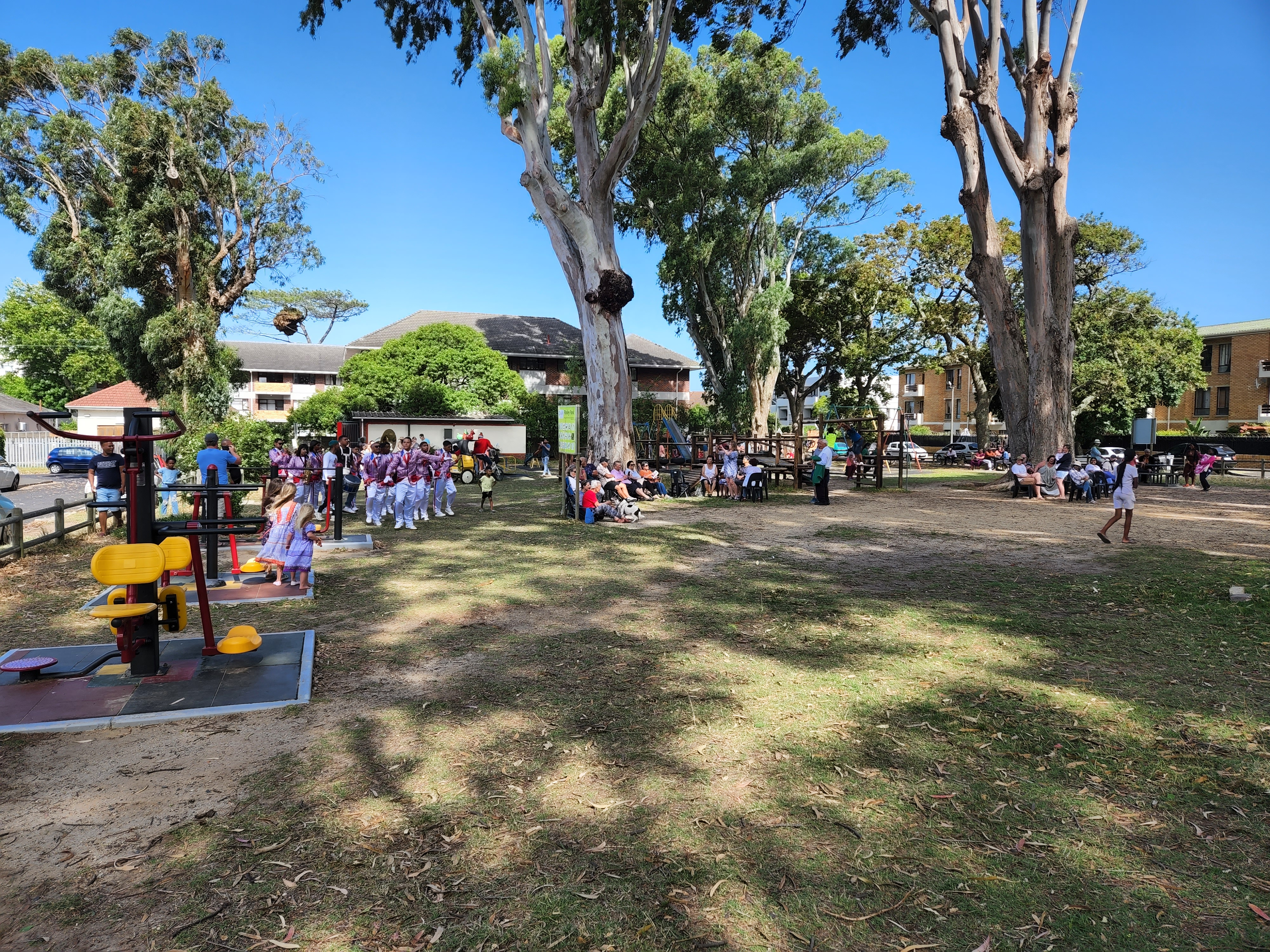
- Hampstead Park, the largest park in Harfield Village (top). A community event in Purly Park (bottom).
- Interactive map of Harfield Village
- Coordinates: 33.986°S 18.476°E
- Country: South Africa
- Province: Western Cape
- Municipality: City of Cape Town
- Time zone: UTC+2 (SAST)
- Postal code (street): 7708

Harfield Village, also known as Lower Claremont, is a neighbourhood in the south of Cape Town. It is located between the suburbs of Kenilworth and Claremont, Cape Town. The Arderne Gardens are located to the area's immediate north on the other side of Harfield Station. Although it is typically regarded as being part of Claremont, parts of the village overlap with areas commonly regarded as being parts of lower Kenilworth.

== Features ==
The area has a number of Victorian and Edwardian era cottages. Most streets are named after counties in England such as Surrey, Suffolk and Norfolk. Harfield Village possibly got its name from the original Harfield Cottage, built by Thomas Mathew, one of the initial residents of Claremont.

The area hosts 4 parks (Hampstead, Purley, Surrey, and Princes), two primary schools (Rosmead Primary and De Heide School for the disabled), and one high school (Livingston High School). A number of restaurants and other businesses are concentrated along 2nd Avenue, notably Banana Jam Café. Three churches are located within the community, including Saint James Church which is located within the overlap area with Kenilworth.

It has one Metrorail train station, Harfield Road Railway Station, that is located on the Southern Line.

== History ==
Following the Battle of Blaauwberg in 1814 and the resulting British acquisition of the Cape Colony a number of British nationals settled in the area. The area remained rural and largely under developed until the arrival of the railway connecting nearby Wynberg to Cape Town in 1864. In 1881 the businessman and politician, John Molteno, bought, subdivided and sold-on land parcels in the area now known as Claremont and Harfield Village.

Prior to the apartheid era Group Areas Act the area was home to around 19,000 Coloured residents. All of whom were evicted or forced to sell their property when the area was declared a whites only area in 1969.
