= SARMOTI =

SARMOTI is an acronym for "Siegfried And Roy, Masters Of The Impossible". It may refer to:

- Siegfried & Roy, entertainers, who used "SARMOTI" as a magic word
- College of Magic § The SARMOTI Grant
- Sarmoti, a fictional lion in Father of the Pride
- Sarmoti, the real-life Siegfried & Roy lion whom the fictional lion represents
