= Batho =

Batho may refer to:

- Basotho Batho Democratic Party, political party in Lesotho
- Batho baronets, holders of the Batho Baronetcy title, of Frinton in Essex
- Batho Pele (Sotho: "People First"), a South African political initiative
- Delphine Batho (born 1973), French Minister of Ecology, Sustainable Development and Energy, member of the Socialist Party
- Edith Clara Batho (1895–1986), Principal of Royal Holloway College, University of London (RHC) from 1945 to 1962
