= Michael Oak Waldorf School =

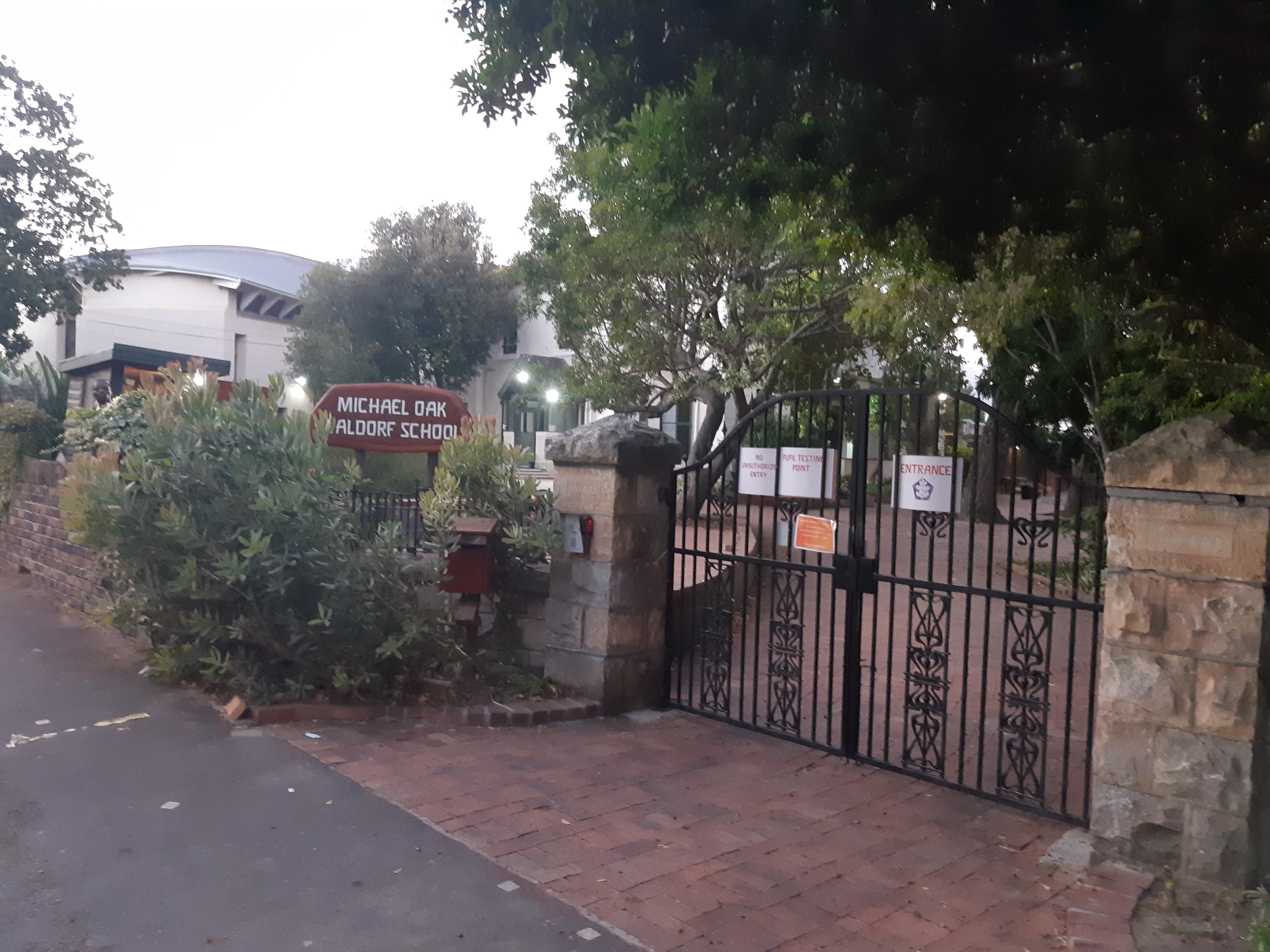
- Front gate of Michael Oak Waldorf School with the school hall visible in the background behind the sign.

Location
- 4 Marlow Road, Kenilworth; Cape Town, Western Cape, 7708; South Africa
- Coordinates: 33°59′47.5″S 18°28′26″E

Information
- School type: Waldorf
- Established: 1962
- Grades: Pre-K - Grade 12
- Enrollment: 430
- Website: www.michaeloak.org.za

Michael Oak Waldorf School is a co-educational Waldorf school in Cape Town, Western Cape, South Africa. Founded in 1962, the school is divided into a pre-school, primary school and high school and offers playgroup through to Matric. Michael Oak Waldorf School is located in the suburb of Kenilworth and is a registered independent school.

== History ==
Michael Oak Waldorf School began as a single house in Rosmead Avenue, Kenilworth in 1962. The property was bought by parents at an auction and was made into the school's first classroom, accommodating 15 students. Over the next few years, more classrooms as well as a school hall was built. The parents eventually expanded the school and created a kindergarten inside the neighbour's home.

== Awards ==
In 2017 the school was rated as one of the top 30 achieving schools in South Africa for physical science by the University of Pretoria.
