= Kenilworth, Cape Town =

Kenilworth
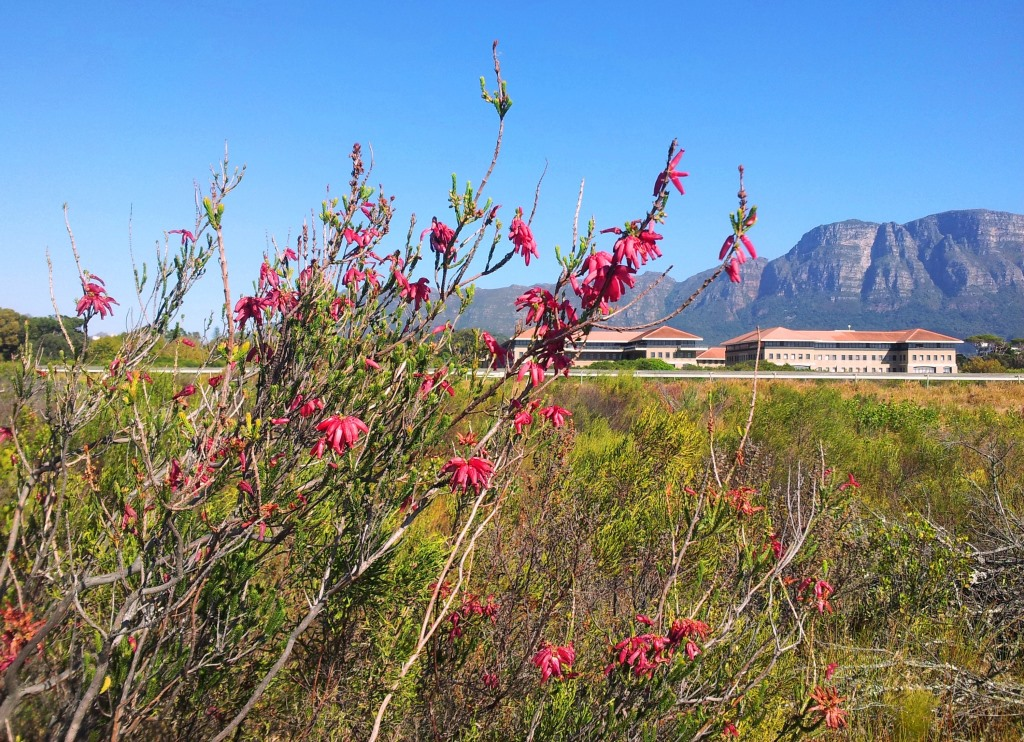
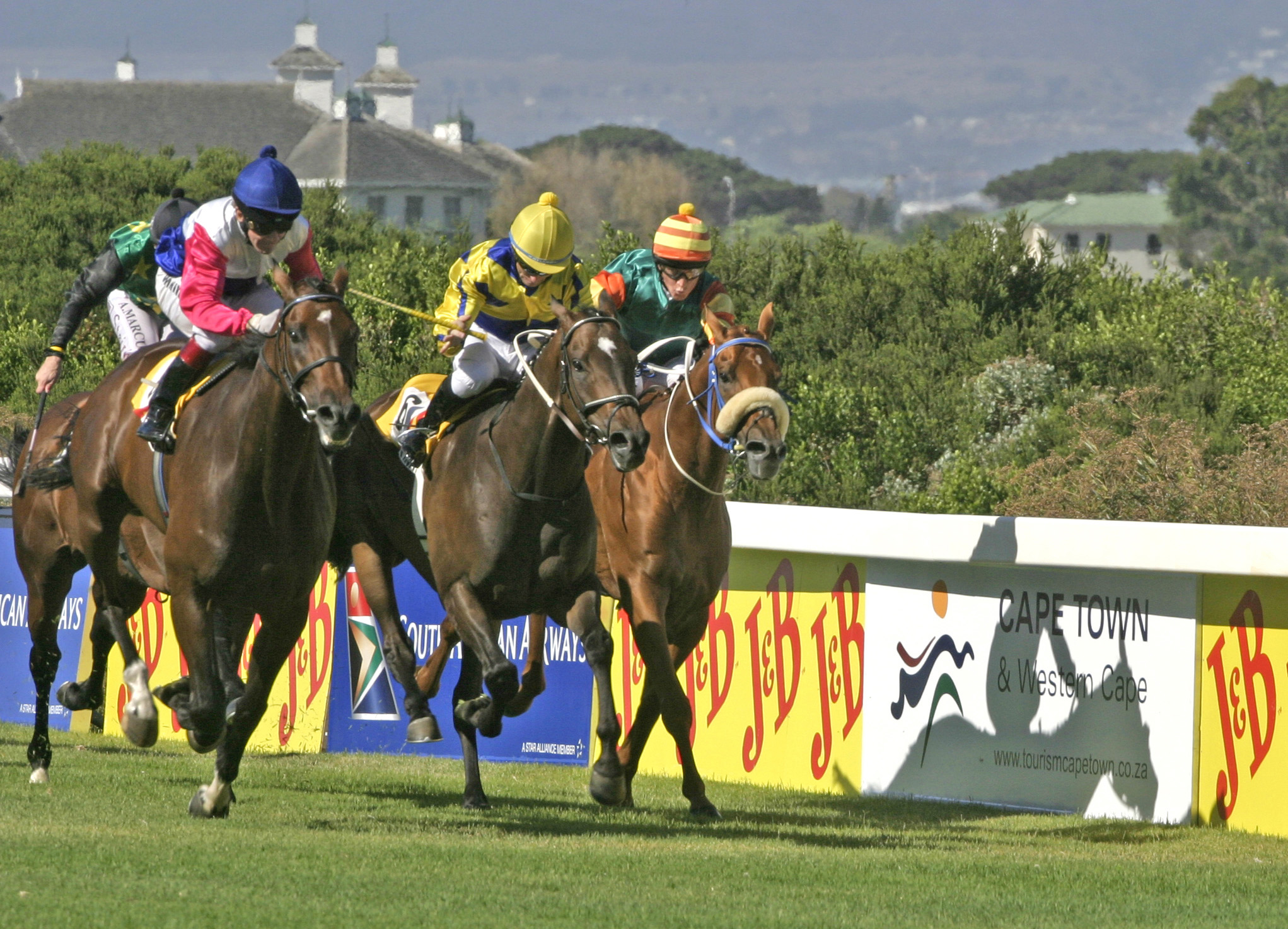
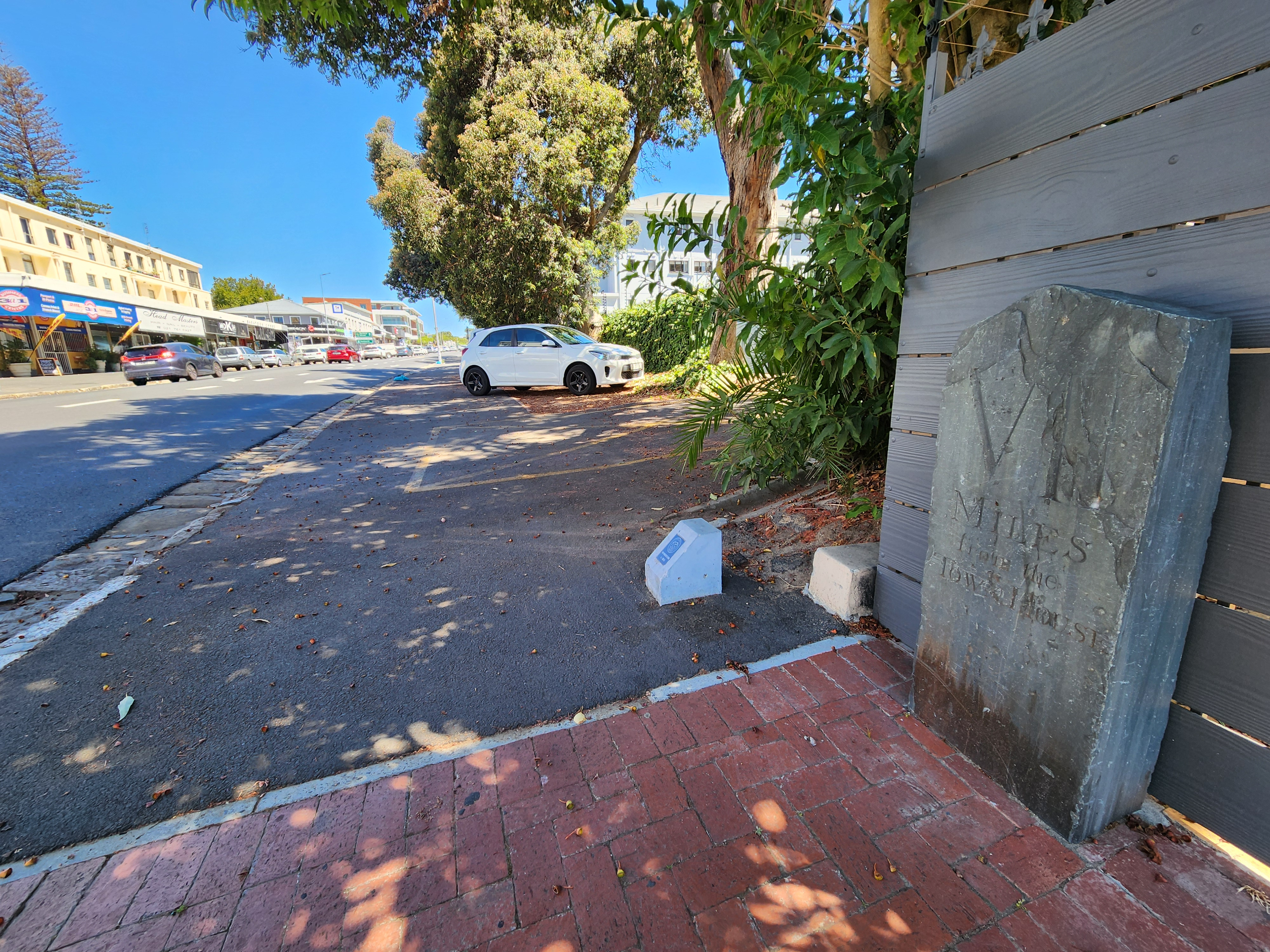
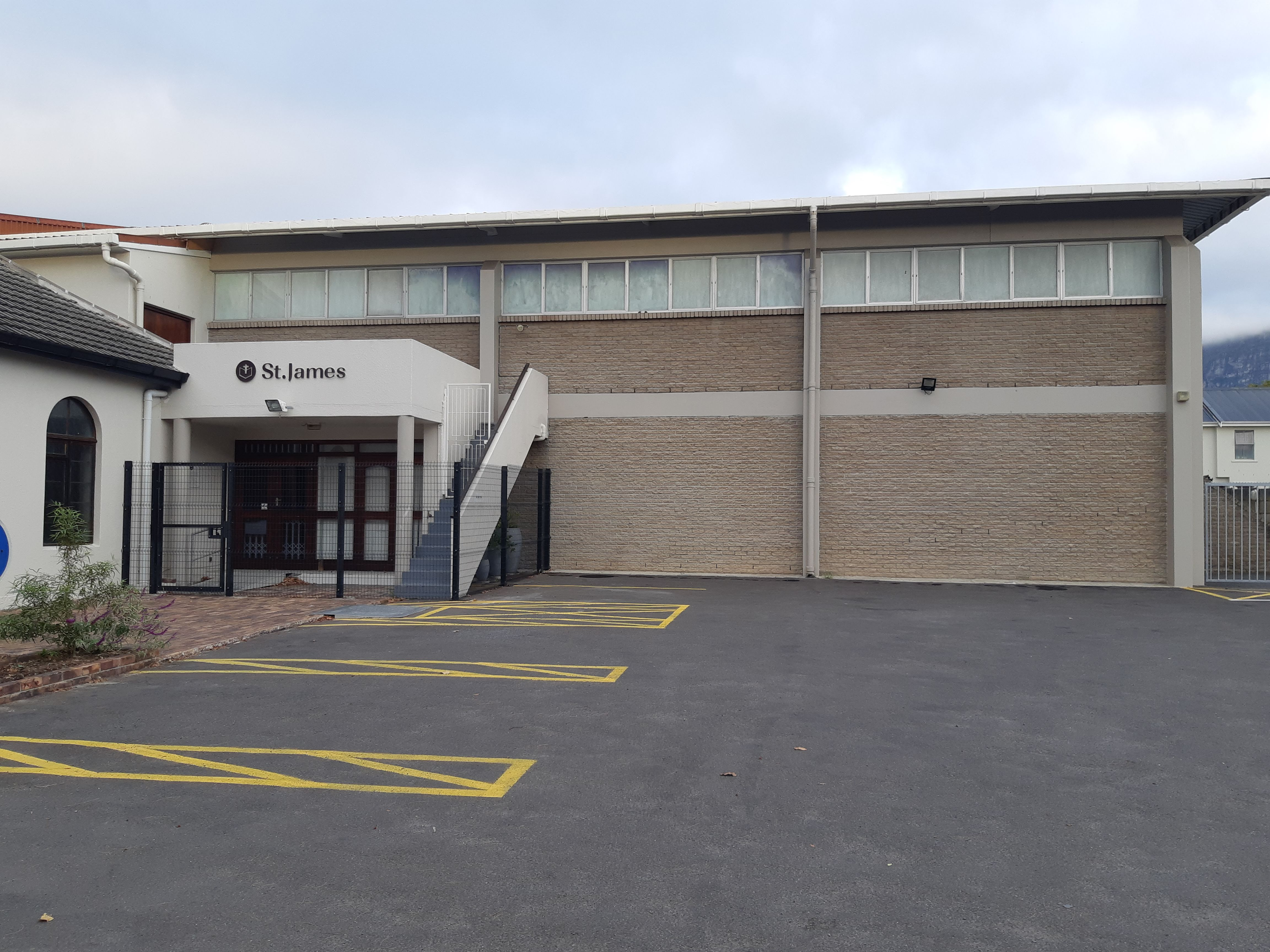
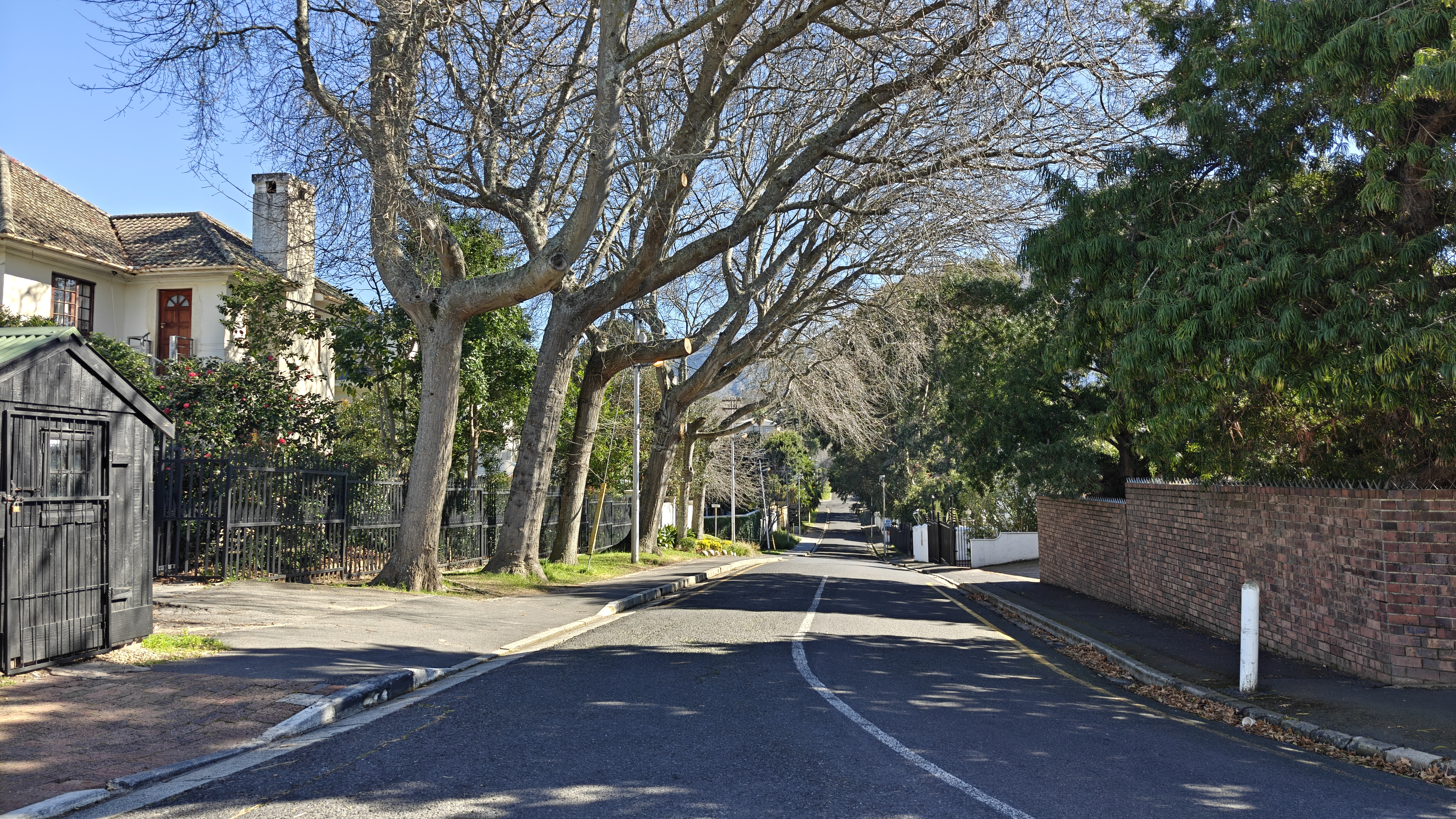
- Kenilworth Racecourse Conservation Area Kenilworth Racecourse Kenilworth milestone Saint James Church View down Oak Avenue
- Interactive map of Kenilworth
- Coordinates: 33°59′45″S 18°28′30″E
- Country: South Africa
- Province: Western Cape
- Municipality: City of Cape Town
- Main Place: Cape Town

Government
  - Councillor: Matthew Kempthorne (Ward 58) (DA); Ian Iversen (Ward 59) (DA)

Area
  - Total: 3.46 km^{2} (1.34 sq mi)

Population (2011)
  - Total: 10,872
  - Density: 3,140/km^{2} (8,140/sq mi)

Racial makeup (2011)
  - Black African: 21.4%
  - Coloured: 16.3%
  - Indian/Asian: 4.9%
  - White: 54.0%
  - Other: 3.4%

First languages (2011)
  - English: 78.8%
  - Afrikaans: 7.8%
  - Xhosa: 4.3%
  - Other: 9.1%
- Time zone: UTC+2 (SAST)
- Postal code (street): 7708
- PO box: 7745

Kenilworth is a suburb in Cape Town, South Africa situated in the Southern Suburbs region of the city.

== Etymology ==
The earliest recorded reference to the Kenilworth area was as "Weltevreden" (Dutch for "well-satisfied") in the 1700s. The name Kenilworth was adopted in the late 1800s.

The origin of the modern name of the suburb is unclear but it was possibly named after the famous 19th century novel 'Kenilworth' by Sir Walter Scott. Alternatively it might have been named after the village of the same name in England.

== Geography ==
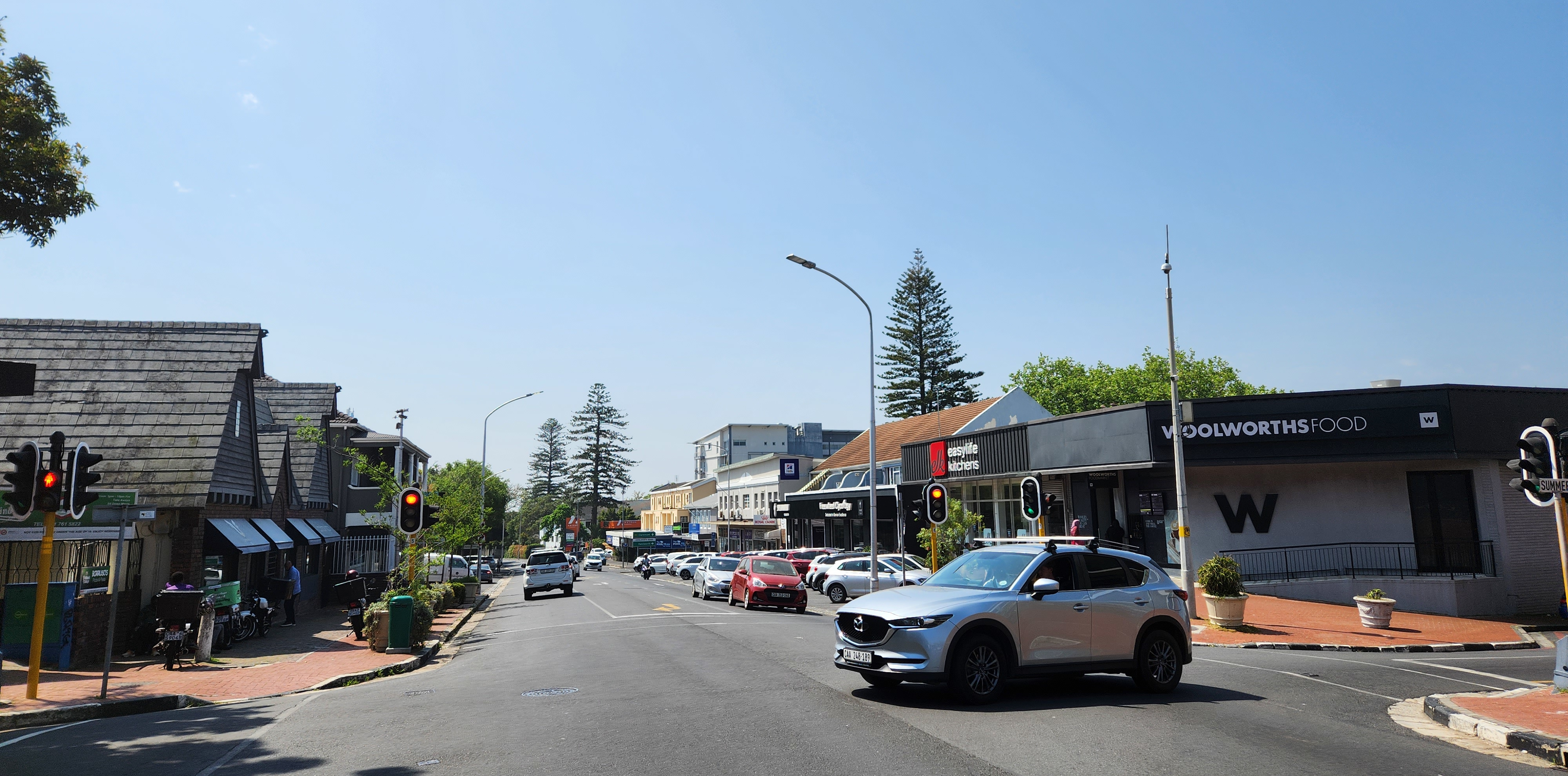
The M4 (Main Road) as it runs through Kenilworth

Kenilworth is bordered by Wynberg to the south, Claremont to the north and west, and Kenwyn to the east. Kenilworth railway station is on the main line from Cape Town to Simon's Town. Main Road (which runs from Central Cape Town through to Simon's Town) runs through Kenilworth, and the suburb can also be accessed from the M5 freeway. The neighbourhood is informally divided into the wealthier Upper Kenilworth area on the western side of the railway tracks, Lower Kenilworth on the eastern side of the railway south of Kenilworth Road, and the area north of Kenilworth Road that overlaps into Harfield Village.

== Demographics ==
As of the census of 2001, there were 4,850 households and 10,304 people residing in the suburb. The racial makeup of the suburb was 12.50% Black African, 16.14% Coloured, 3.73% Indian/Asian, 67.63% White and 0% from other races.

In the suburb the population was spread out, with 18% under the age of 18, 35.95% from 18 to 34, 24.13% from 35 to 54, 8.65% from 55 to 64, and 12.95% 65 or older. The median age was 37 years. For every 100 females there were 77.44 males.

81.22% of the population speak English, 7.20% speak Afrikaans, 6.49% speak Xhosa, 2.53% speak another African language and 2.55% some other language as a first language.

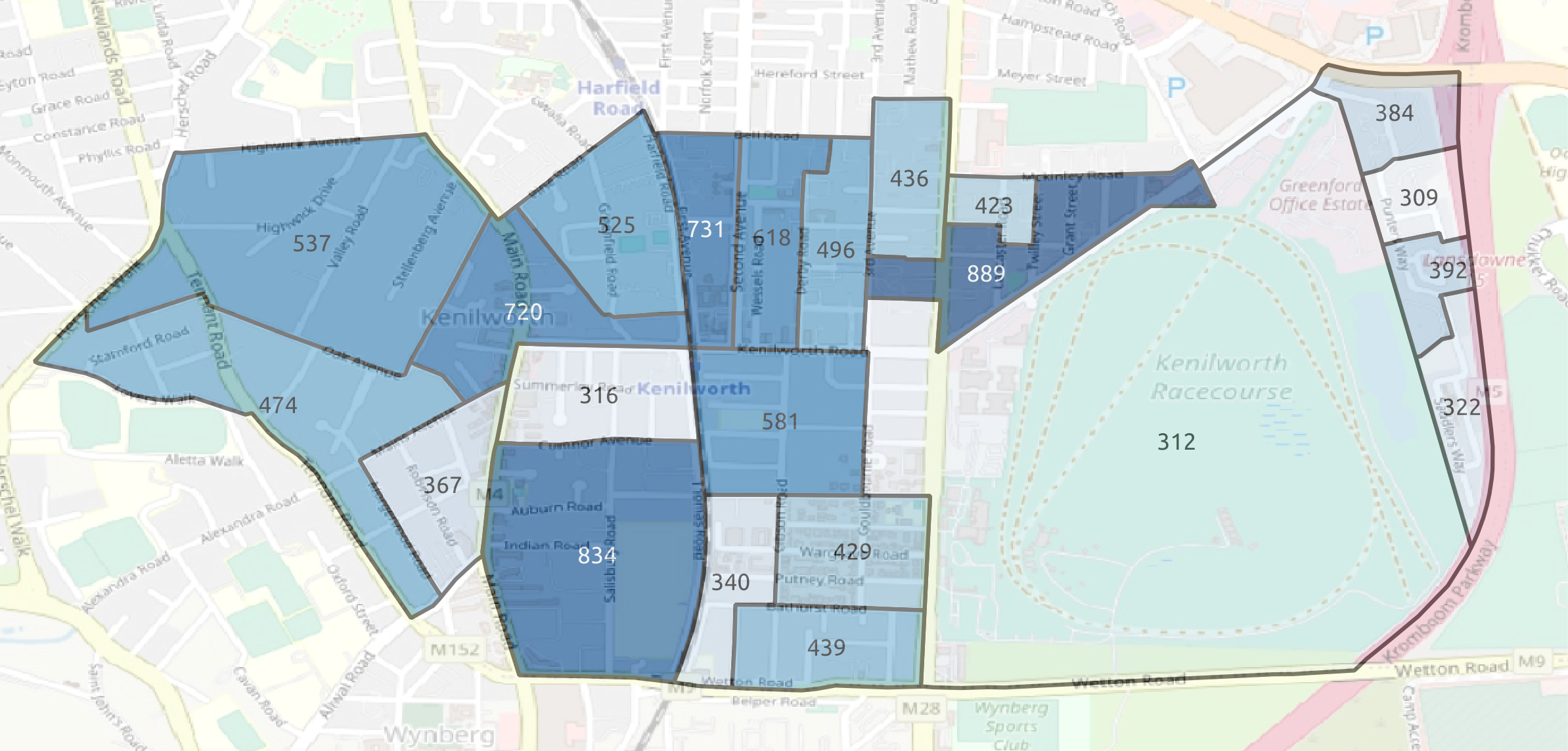
Map of Kenilworth showing population density from highest (dark blue) to lowest (light blue), as at the 2011 census

== History ==
Prior to the establishment of the suburb due to urban expansion from Cape Town in the 1800s the area was part of the Stellenberg farm. The farm was originally established by former Cape governor Simon van der Stel and given to his son Frans van der Stel.

During his term as Governor of the Cape Colony from 1814 to 1824 Lord Charles Somerset lived on a farm in the upper part of Kenilworth. Following the establishment of the racecourse in 1882 and the construction of the train station in 1865, the area became more sought after. In this period a number of mansions were built in the area to the west of the racecourse in lower and upper Kenilworth. During the second Anglo-Boer War the racecourse was temporarily used to house Boer prisoners of war.

The historically better developed neighbourhoods of Claremont to the north and Wynberg to the south and their respective commercial hubs along Main Road have always played an important role in Kenilworth's history and economy.

=== Saint James Church massacre ===
On 25 July 1993 four members of Azanian People's Liberation Army (APLA) attacked Saint James Church in Kenilworth; 11 members of the congregation were killed and 58 wounded. The attack took place at a turbulent time in South African history, during the country's transition from apartheid to its first non-racial democratic elections in 1994.

== Kenilworth racecourse ==
An attraction which draws visitors to Kenilworth is the Kenilworth Racecourse. The oldest race course in the country, established in 1882, it is home to the Sun Met (previously the J&B Met until 2016) held in late January each year, which draws more than 50,000 spectators. The race has been won by horses who have gone on to international success, including Horse Chestnut and Wolf Power. The Queens Plate, a similar event but smaller and more exclusive than the Sun Met, is held every year around two to three weeks before the Met. Numerous other Grade 1 horse races are held at Kenilworth throughout the year.

The 52 hectare Kenilworth Racecourse Conservation Area established in 1985 at the centre of the race track is an important conservation area and seasonal wetland. Hosting many indigenous species of Cape sand fynbos fauna and flora.

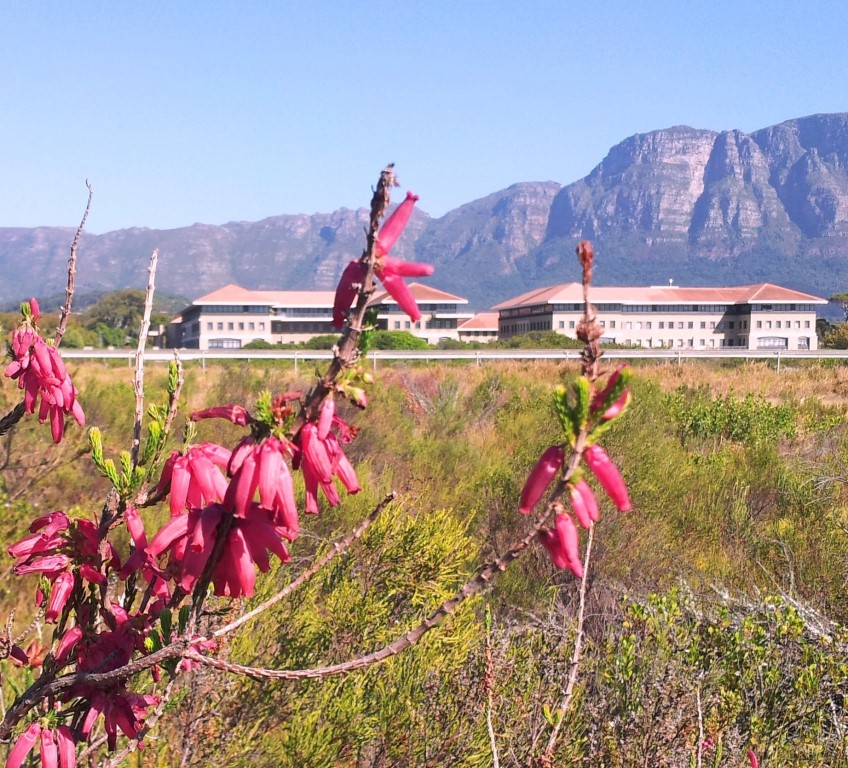

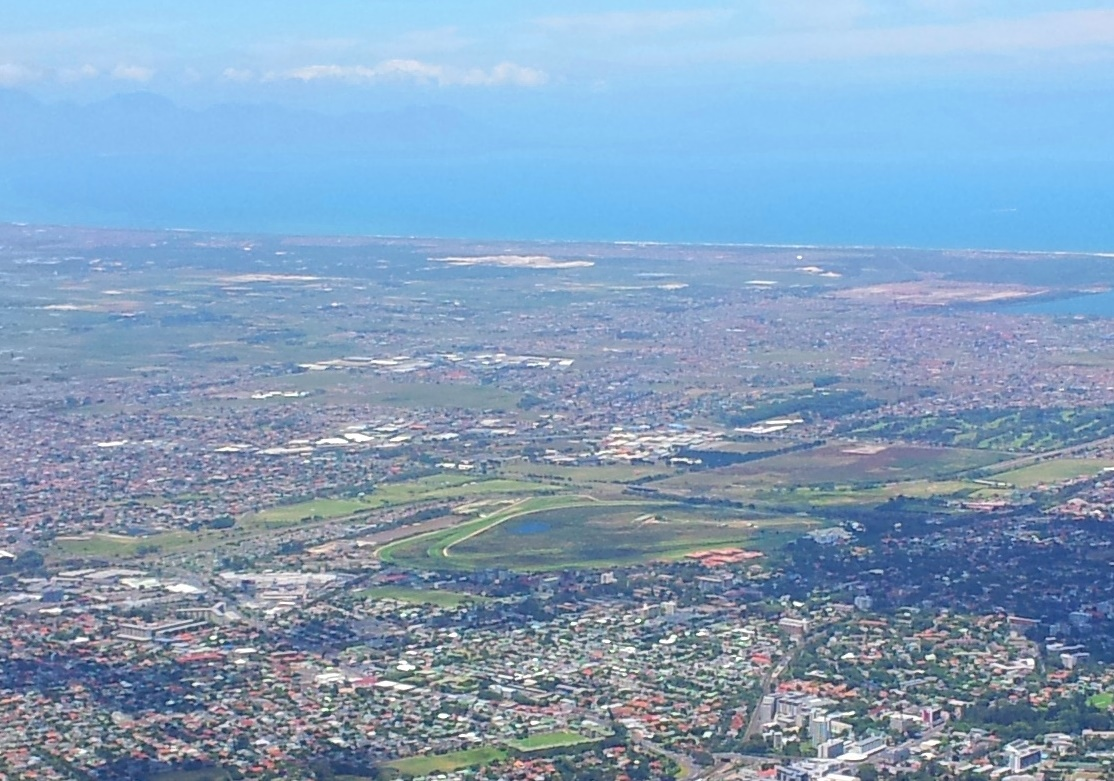

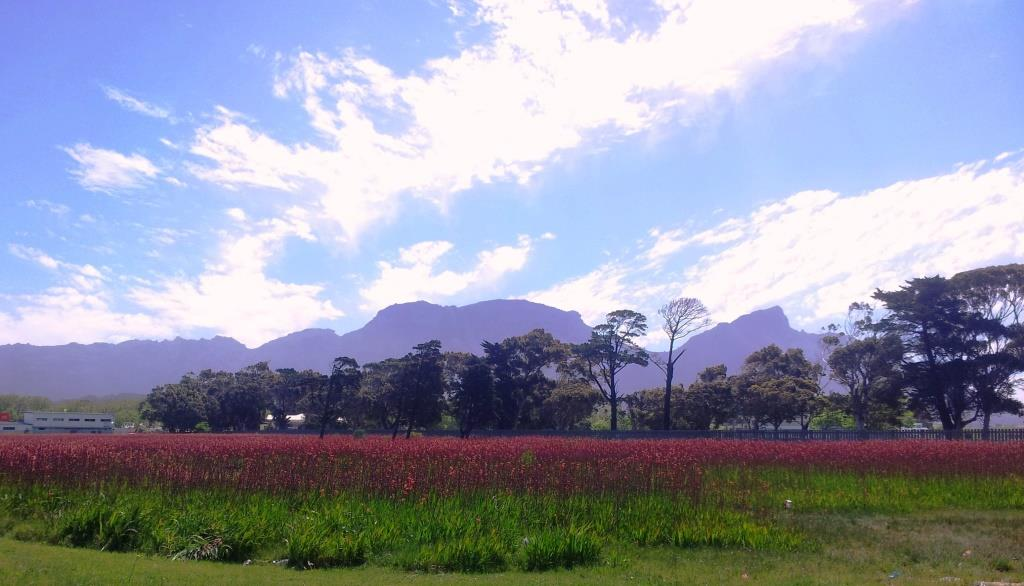

== Economy ==
The Kenilworth Racecourse is a large part of the economy of the suburb, not only drawing in large crowds during the Sun Met and smaller crowds during the more common races but it is also the site of a commercial park that hosts numerous businesses including the headquarters of Pick 'n Pay Stores Limited. Access Park, a large factory outlet shopping complex, is also located in the suburb. The shopping area along Main Road is known as a commercial centre for the purchase and repair of bicycles, whilst the area around the intersection of Kenilworth Road and 2nd Avenue has a number of restaurants and drinking establishments. Health care also has a large presence in the area with a number of private medical practices and drug rehabilitation centers.

Since the 1990s the neighbourhood has become known as a centre for street prostitution in Cape Town, particularly the area along Main Road, Kenilworth Road and Harfield Road.

As of 2022 the area has a wide range of restaurants and drinking establishments located along Main Road and 2nd Avenue many of which merge into nearby Harfield Village.

== Education ==
Schools in Kenilworth
Secondary or high schools	Voortrekker High School
Primary or elementary schools	Greenfield Girls' Primary School
Private schools	Cedar House • Michael Oak Waldorf School • Auburn House Montessori School
Other schools	Beau Soleil Music Centre

== Notable residents ==
- James Rose Innes (1855–1942), chief justice of South Africa.
- Jessie Rose-Innes (1860-1943), social campaigner and suffragist.
- Thomas Stewart (1857–1942), civil engineer.
- Henry Latham Currey (1863–1945), Cape Colony politician.
- Bill Bisset (1867–1958), rugby player.
- Arthur Bisset (1879–1955), cricketer.
- Magdalena Sauer (1890–1983), South Africa's first female architect.
- Kathleen Murray (1892–1984), farmer, philanthropist and Black Sash activist.
- Johannes de Villiers Graaff (1928–2015), economist.
- Iqbal Survé (1963), businessman.
- John Gilbert Kotzé (1849-1940), jurist.
