= Woodhead Dam =

Dam on Table Mountain, Western Cape, South Africa

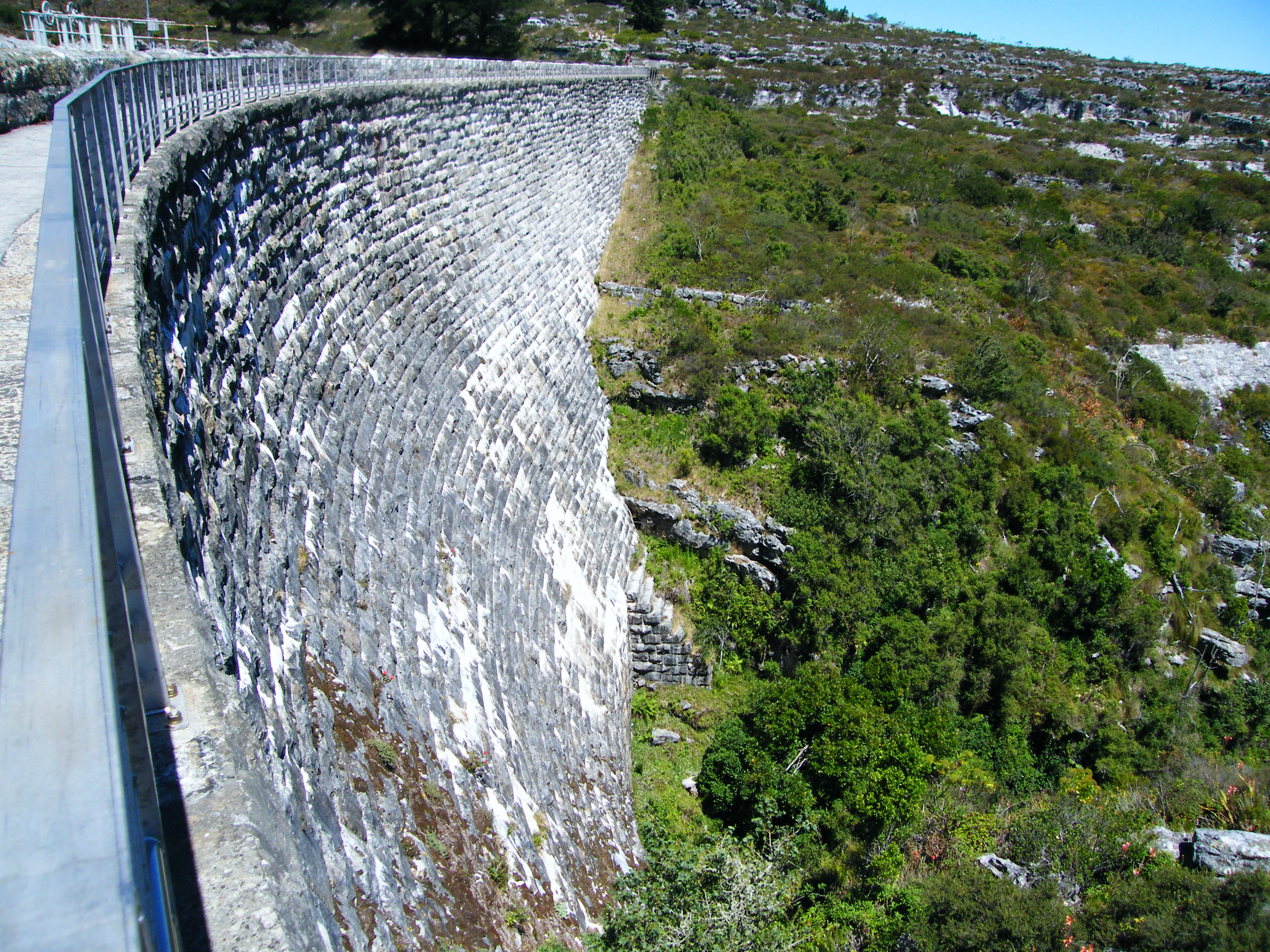
- Woodhead Dam

- Location within Cape Town
- Location: Table Mountain, Western Cape, South Africa
- Coordinates: 33°58′35″S 18°24′08″E
- Construction began: 1894
- Opening date: 1897
- Owner: Cape Town Municipality

Dam and spillways
- Type of dam: Masonry gravity dam
- Impounds: Disa Stream
- Height: 50 m (164 ft)
- Length: 277 m (909 ft)
- Spillway type: Free overspill
- Spillway capacity: 20 m^{3}/s (706 ft^{3}/s)

Reservoir
- Creates: Woodhead Reservoir
- Total capacity: 927,000 m^{3} (32,737,000 ft^{3})
- Surface area: 13 ha (32 acres)

Woodhead Dam is a dam on Table Mountain, Western Cape, South Africa. It was built in 1897 and supplies water to Cape Town. The dam, which was the first large masonry dam in South Africa, was designated as an International Historic Civil Engineering Landmark by the American Society of Civil Engineers in 2008.

== History ==
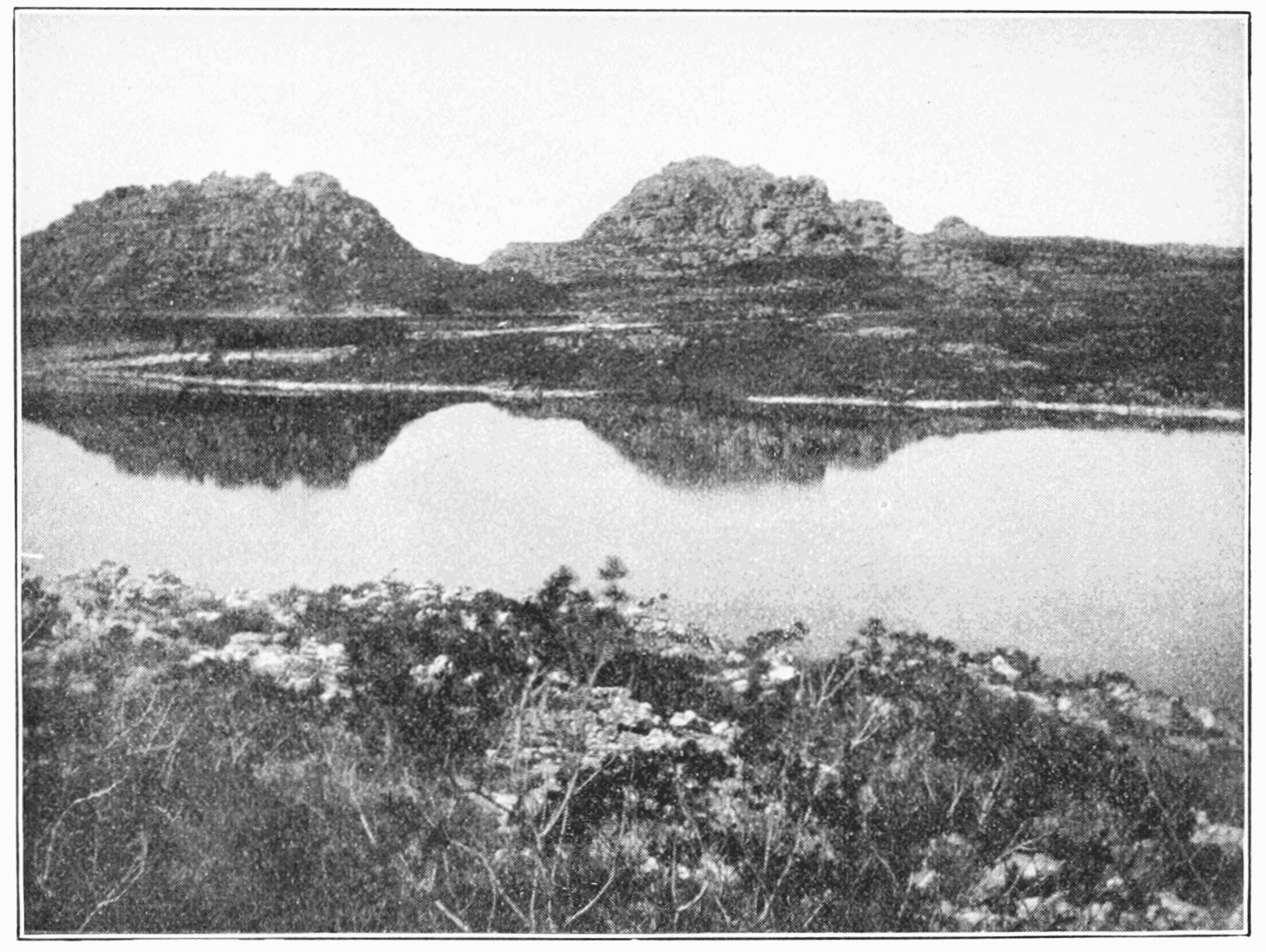
View over Woodhead Dam in 1906, from Popular Science Monthly Volume 68

In 1870, the growth of Cape Town led to shortages of drinking water. It was decided to build a reservoir on Table Mountain to provide water to the city. Scottish hydraulic engineer Thomas Stewart was engaged to design and build the reservoir.

The Woodhead Tunnel was built between 1888 and 1891. It was used to divert the Disa Stream, a tributary of the Hout Bay River, westward to provide water for the reservoir.

An aerial cableway was constructed to transport men and materials to the construction site. The dam was constructed between 1894 and 1897. This dam was followed by four others in the area. The Hely-Hutchinson Dam and reservoir were built by 1904 just upstream of the Woodhead reservoir. The Alexandra Dam and Victoria Dam were built on the original Disa Stream by 1903. The last of the five dams was the De Villiers Dam in 1907. This was built downstream of the Alexandra and Victoria Dams. Today, these five dams supply around 0.4% of the water for Cape Town.

== Design ==
The Woodhead Tunnel is 640 m (2,100 ft) long. The Woodhead Dam is a masonry gravity dam that is 277 m (909 ft) long and 50 m (164 ft) high. It has a free overspill spillway with a capacity of 20 m^{3}/s (706 ft^{3}/s). The reservoir has a capacity of 927,000 m^{3} (32,737,000 ft^{3}) and a surface area of 13 ha (32 acres).

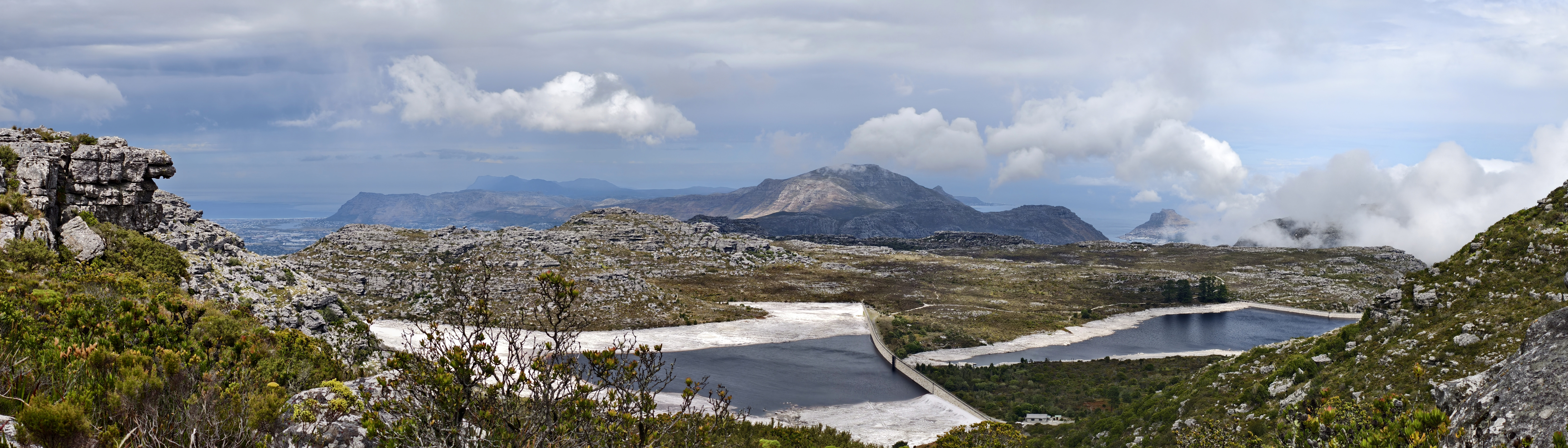
Hely-Hutchinson Reservoir (left) and Woodhead Reservoir (right), Table Mountain, Cape Town, South Africa

== See also ==
- List of reservoirs and dams in South Africa
