= Arderne Gardens =

Public park and arboretum in Claremont, Cape Town

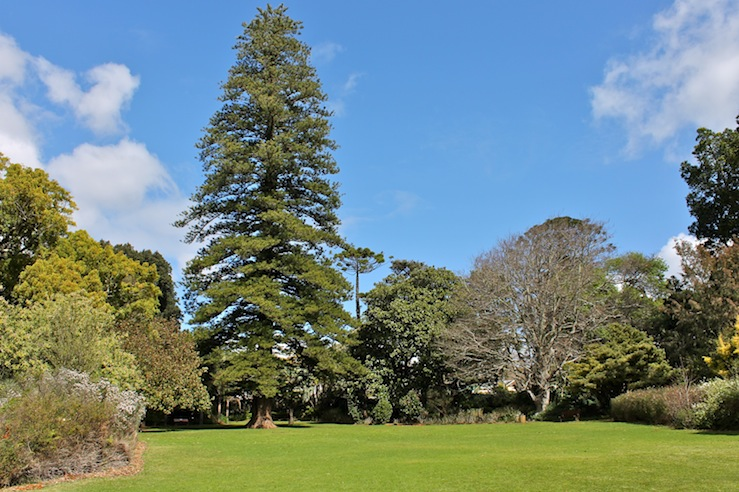
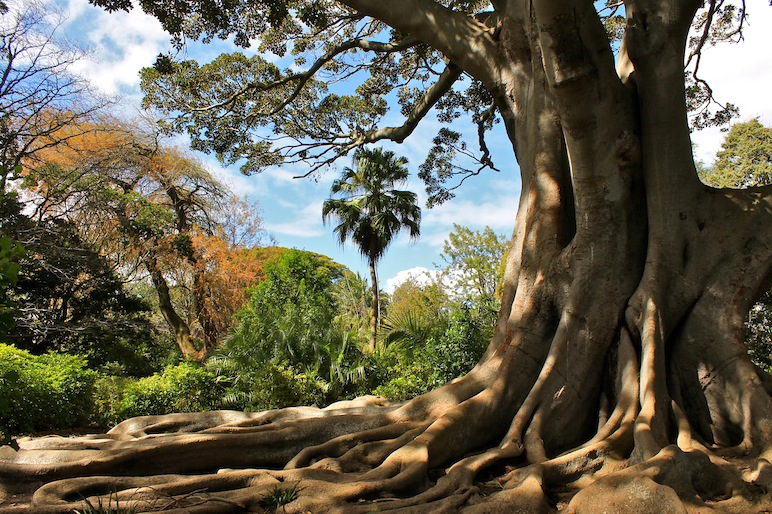
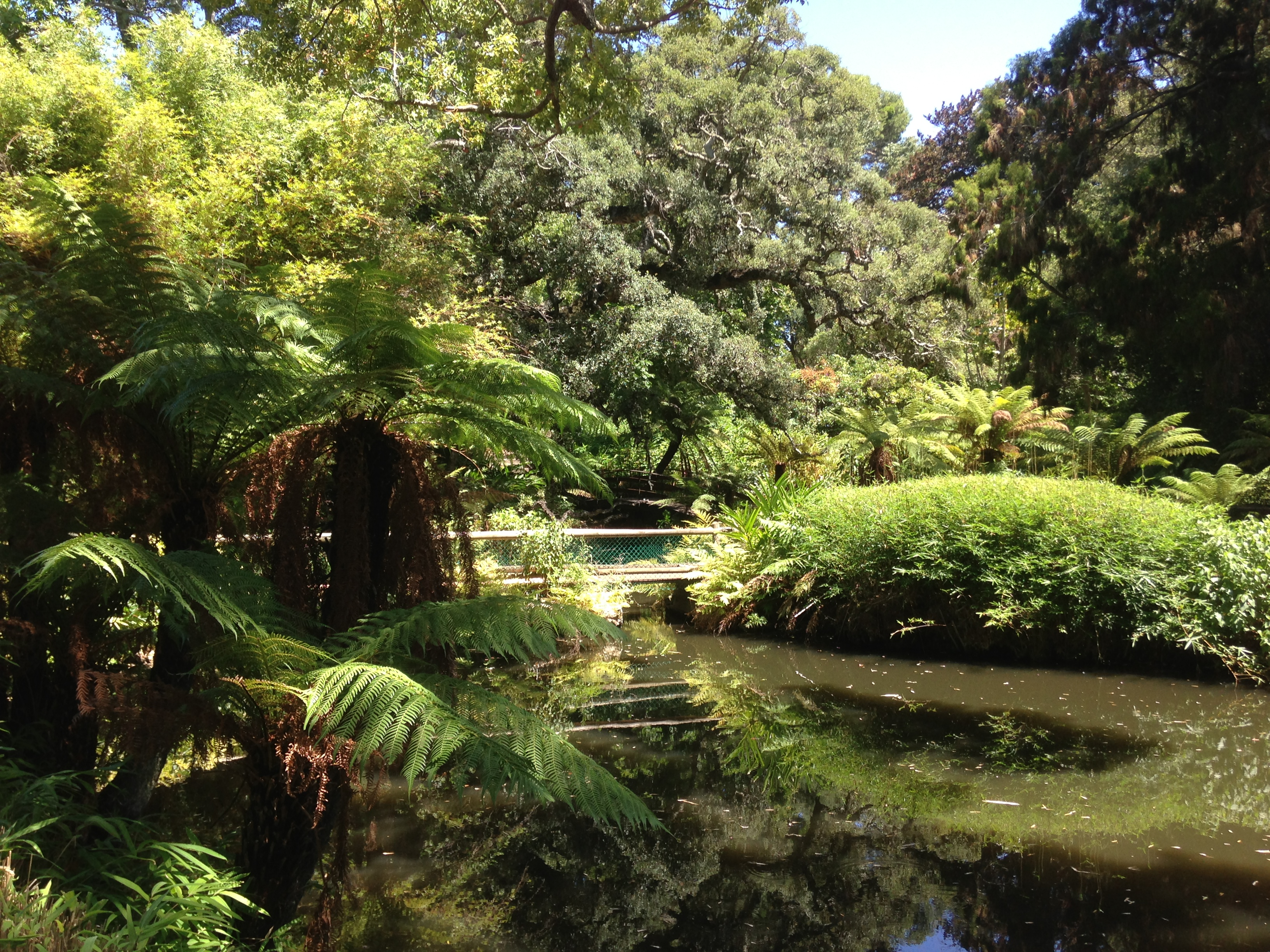
- Top, the grand Norfolk pine in Arderne Gardens. Bottom left, a Moreton Bay fig tree. Bottom right, the ponds at the Arderne Gardens.
- Interactive map of Arderne Gardens
- Type: Botanical
- Location: 222 Main Road Claremont, Cape Town 7708 South Africa
- Coordinates: 33.987281°S 18.464864°E
- Established: 1845 (181 years ago)
- Website: www.ardernegardens.org.za

Arderne Gardens is a public park and arboretum in Claremont, Cape Town, located in the Western Cape of South Africa. It was established in 1845 by Ralph Henry Arderne, a timber merchant originally from Cheshire, England. In 1979, the park was named a South African Provincial Heritage Site. It is now a popular venue for wedding photographs. The 4.5-hectare park contains over 300 trees, six of which have been designated as Champion Trees by the Department of Agriculture, Forestry and Fisheries.

The Moreton Bay fig near the park entrance is one of the largest trees in the country and is nicknamed the "Wedding Tree" by locals.

The ponds in the garden are the source of the Black River which then runs underground beneath Main Road and the railway line before emerging as a canal. The garden is best known for the wide open lawn (sometimes called the "great lawn") surrounding a Norfolk Pine and a Japanese-style koi pond. Unlike nearby Kirstenbosch Botanical Gardens, the focus of the Arderne Gardens is the cultivation of exotic species.

== History ==
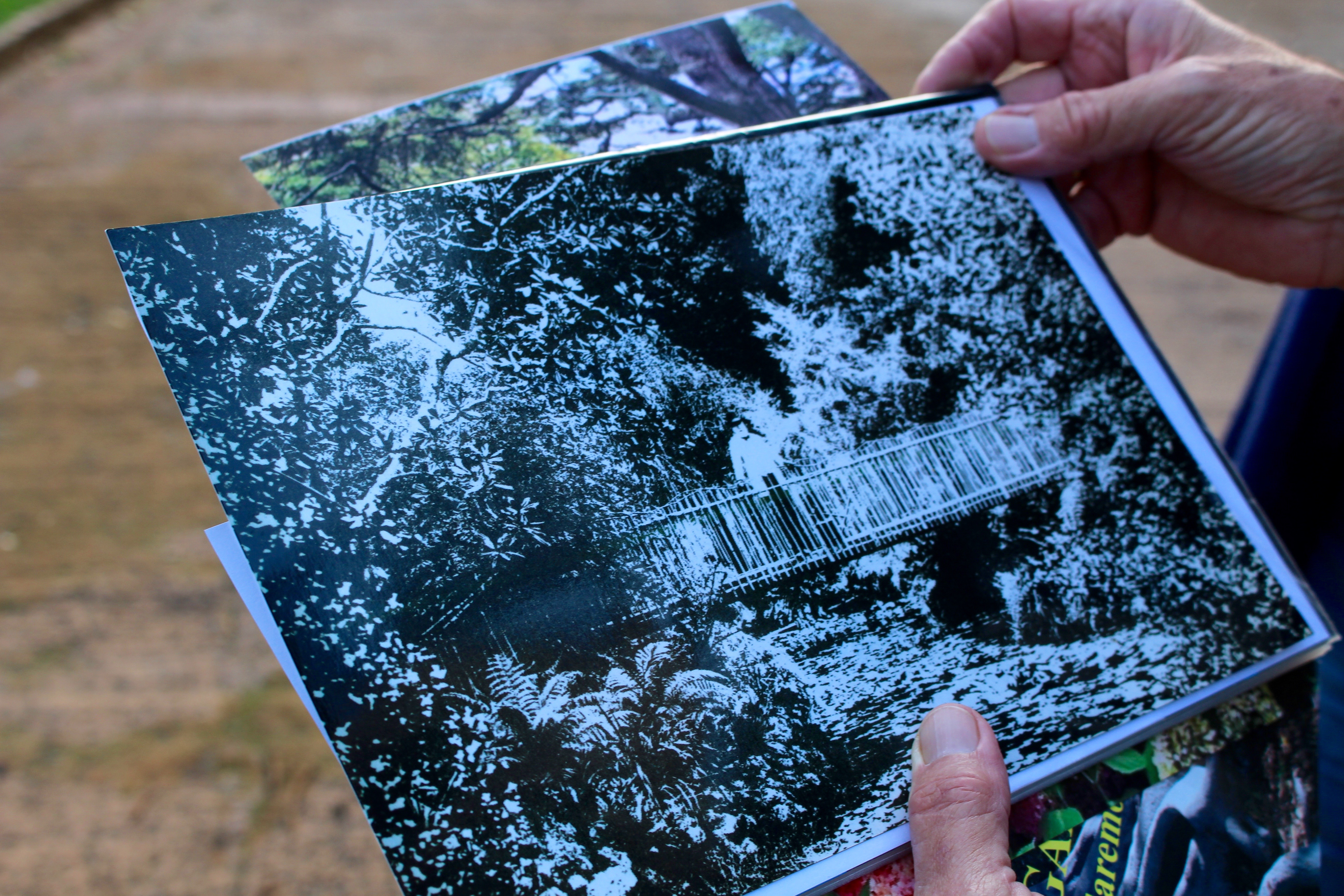
Hank Lith (FOTAG committee member) handles a copy of a vintage photograph of Ralph Henry Arderne in his garden.

As a timber merchant living in the Cape Colony in the late 1800s, Ralph Henry Arderne (1802-1885) was in the unique position to trade indigenous plant seedlings in exchange for the exotic seedlings, shrubs, and perennial plants carried by ships that had stopped to replenish their supplies. In 1845, he acquired the section of land (part of the old Stellenberg Estate) where he planted a garden, built a home and called it "The Hill". In time, the garden became famous among local residents as a place to stroll and enjoy the outdoors.

Henry Mathew Arderne (1834-1914), Ralph's oldest son, took over the garden in the early part of the twentieth century. He continued his father's tradition of trading local seedlings for exotic plants until his death in 1914. That same year, the Arderne property was purchased by Mr. G. Wilks. He proceeded to divide the land into building lots and demolished The Hill. In 1928, Mr. A. W. van den Houten, the Director of Parks and Gardens in the Cape Town Municipality, persuaded City Council to buy a 4.5-hectare section of the garden stretching from Main Road to the site where the Arderne's house once stood. In 1961, this section of land was officially named the Arderne Gardens. Mr. A. M. J. Scheltens was the curator of the Arderne Gardens for the following 27 years.

In the early 2000s, the Arderne Gardens fell into a state of neglect. In 2004, the non-profit organisation the Friends of the Arderne Gardens was formed to assist the City of Cape Town with protecting, preserving, and promoting public awareness of the garden.
