= College of Magic =

South African nonprofit organization

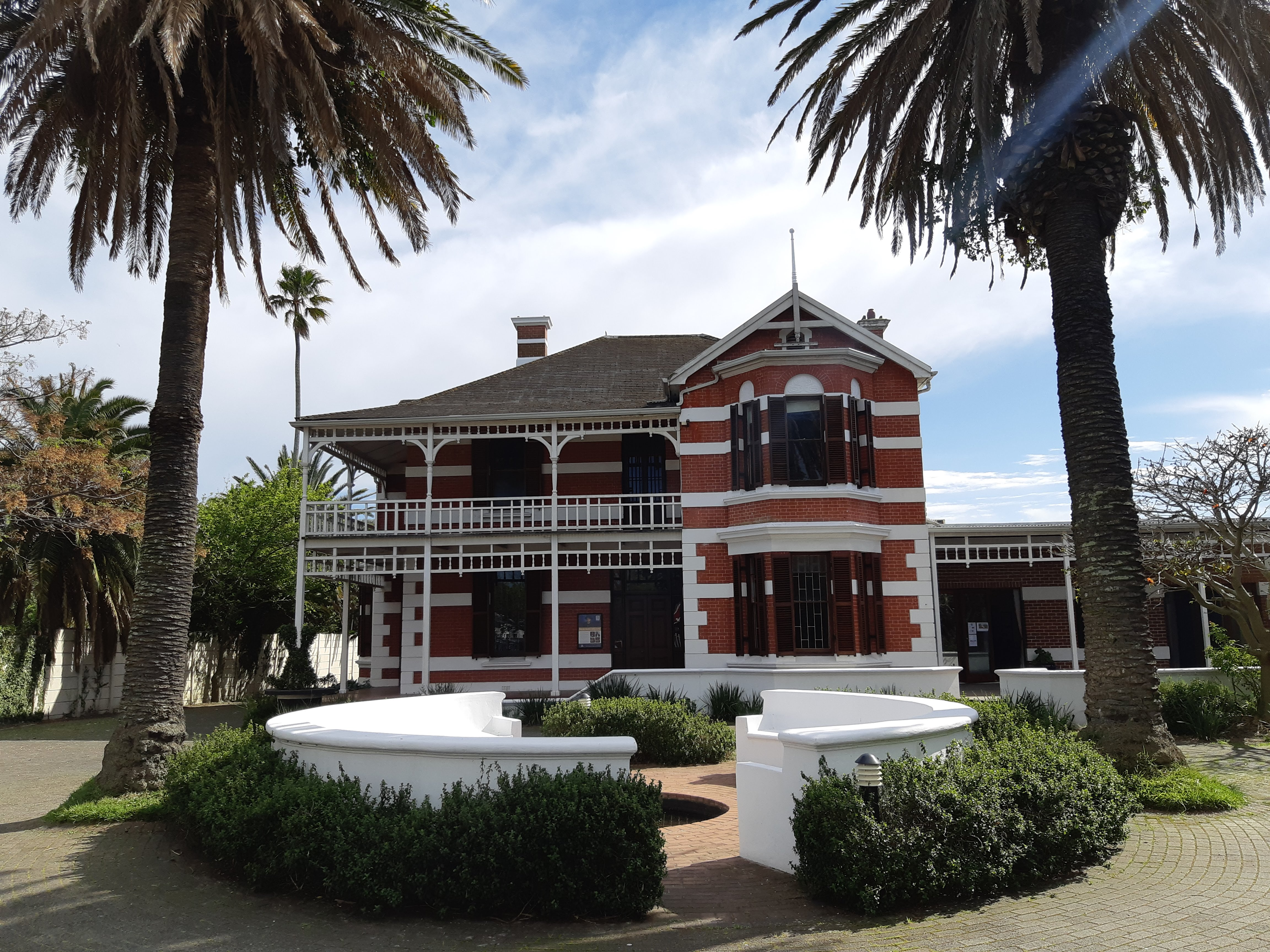
- The College of Magic as seen from the front entrance on Imam Haron Road.
- Type: NPO
- Established: 1980
- Director: David Gore
- Administrative staff: voluntary
- Students: 342
- Location: 215 Lansdowne Road, Claremont, Cape Town, South Africa; 33°59′01″S 18°28′53″E
- Campus: Urban
- Website: www.collegeofmagic.com

College of Magic is a nonprofit organization (007-517 NPO/NGO) based in Cape Town, South Africa that teaches magic. The Director, David Gore, has been with the organization since its inception.

== History ==
The College of Magic opened its doors on February 23, 1980. It was established to provide performance-arts training for aspirant entertainers from all sections of Cape Town's community.

In 1992, the college moved into its present home, a renovated Victorian house in Claremont, Cape Town. It was officially opened in 1995 by the Minister of Arts, Culture, Science and Technology as the Magical Arts Centre. The college with the help of the community, restored the building and developed facilities for its teaching and training needs.

== Objectives ==
- Provide skills training in the magical and theatrical arts.
- To promote and improve leadership potential and excellence.
- To offer access to information, performance and employment opportunities, services and resources.
- Empower young people, enabling them to gain the respect of their community.
- Inspire students to be creative and productive through developing their skills, thereby contributing to wealth creation and career development.

== Courses ==
The College of Magic is engaged in performing arts education and training and specializes in training young people – children from the age of 10 years upwards – in the art of magic and the allied arts of juggling, ventriloquism, mime and clowning.

The curriculum consists of six core courses structured hierarchically, with each course increasing in complexity, expectations of the learner and skill mastery. In the first three years, students are introduced to the basics of magic including presentation skills, the theory of entertainment and the essential elements of controlling an audience. During the fourth, fifth and sixth years, the curriculum becomes substantially more demanding in terms of the technical requirements and the theoretical aspects of entertaining. Students focus on entertaining children, sleight of hand, close-up magic, stage magic, magic with animals and stage illusions.

Each course is a cycle that includes:

- Demonstration
- Practice
- Presentation
- Reflection
- Refinement
- Practice
- Presentation

== Staff ==
The staff can be segmented into the following categories:

1. The Non-Executive Board of Management – College of Magic is governed by an experienced board of trustees who are responsible for all decision-making in line with the constitution of the organization. Both their chairperson and their treasurer are graduates of the organization. The executive director and founder of the college, David Gore, has served the organization since 1980.

2. The Administrative Staff – The administrative staff is responsible for the day-to-day running of the organization.

3. The Voluntary Teaching Staff – The college started with three teachers. It has since grown to include professional magicians, experienced teachers, specialists in the various allied arts, graduates of the college, administrative staff and visiting lecturers (local and international). The staff are responsible for all aspects of the courses they are teaching, including syllabus development, lesson preparation, one-on-one tutorial sessions and grading student progress. The teaching staff is the backbone of the organization, and all 14 members are volunteers.

== The Magical Arts Centre ==
College of Magic is currently resident in its premises situated on Imam Haron Road in Claremont Cape Town. These premises were officially opened as the "Magical Arts Centre" (MAC) on 24 February 1995 by the then Department of Arts, Culture, Science and Technology.

The MAC consists of a double-story Victorian house with a wrap-around porch upstairs and downstairs, and is situated on 1840 m2 of property. Five rooms are used for teaching purposes and two further rooms are available for tutorials.

The building has a courtyard in which the college's animals are kept. There are two large shipping containers in the back garden; one stores an extensive collection of stage illusions, magical props and costumes; the other is a fully equipped workshop for the students and was developed through the sponsorship of the Old Mutual Foundation.

== Other projects ==
- Magic in the Community is an upliftment program for groups of young people from disadvantaged backgrounds to be transported for weekly lessons from their homes to the college.
- Magic Classroom is a science and magic-based educational class field trip.
- Sponsor a Student is a fundraising initiative to cover the costs of tuition, transport, equipment, clothing and food for students who cannot afford College of Magic fees.

== The SARMOTI Grant ==
In 1997 the Siegfried & Roy SARMOTI Grant was established enabling disadvantaged young people to join the college.

== See also ==
- List of magic museums
