= Livingstone High School =

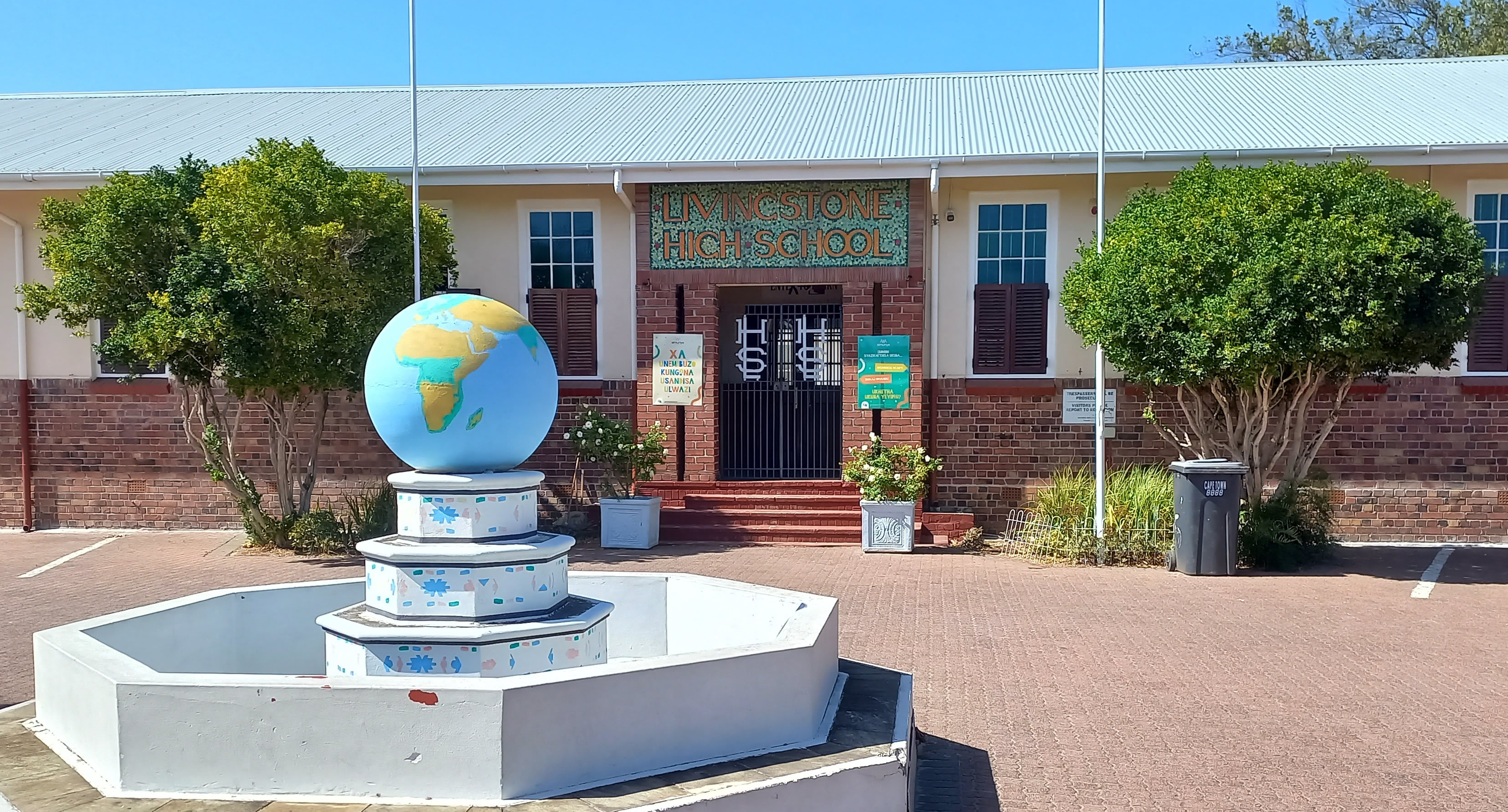

Location
- 100 Imam Haron Rd, Claremont, Cape Town; South Africa
- 33°59′04″S 18°28′30″E

Information
- Type: Public high school
- Motto: Nulla Vestigia Vertrorsum (No Step Back)
- Established: 1926
- School district: Claremont
- Principal: Mrs Raliah Ganie
- Staff: 43
- Grades: 8-12
- Enrollment: 900
- Student to teacher ratio: 21:1
- Campus type: Urban Campus
- Colors: Navy Blue; Red; Gold
- Website: www.livingstonehigh.co.za

Livingstone High School is a school in the Western Cape of South Africa. It was founded by Abdullah Abdurahman in 1926. As of August 2017 Theodore Bruinders was the school's principal, currently the Acting Principal is Mr D.R. Niekerk. Ashley van de Horn is currently the deputy principal.The principal who has been serving the school was Mr Najaar before he had retired. In 2021 the current acting principal is Mrs. Ganie.

The school is regarded as a very high achieving government school with consistently high matric pass rates. In 2018 it had a matric pass rate of 99.3% whilst only charging R7 640 a year in school fees.

== History ==
Livingstone High School, established on 26 February 1926 by Dr Abdullah Abdurahman and with Mr E.C. Roberts as its principle, initially as a Standard 5 (grade 7) level institution. Following the opening of nearby Rosmead Central Primary School in 1941, Livingstone adopted a comprehensive high school structure. During this early period the school experienced growth by renovating the schools' buildings into suitable classrooms, the building had previously been a dairy farm, and expanding with additional wings and into surrounding buildings in the nearby area.

Despite disruptions during World War II and post-war state-related obstacles imposed on the school during the National Party lead Apartheid government, Livingstone High continued to expand and serve a community otherwise deprived of educational opportunities. The school's expansion reflected pragmatic resource utilization, emphasizing its commitment to providing education in historically disadvantaged communities. The motto, "Nulla Vestigia Vertrorsum" (No Step Back), encapsulates its dedication to academic excellence despite neglect and pressure of a hostile government.

== Notable alumni ==
- Geraldine Fraser-Moleketi (1960), a South African politician, Minister for the Public Service and Administration.
- Neal Petersen, solo racing yachtsman and author.
- Ebrahim Rasool (1962), politician and diplomat, Premier of the Western Cape (2004 - 2008)
- Grant Farred (1980), academic and writer
- Gershon Rorich (1994), SA Volleyball Player, 2004 Olympics [Beach Volleybal]
