= United Nations Committee of Experts on Public Administration =

- Abbreviation: CEPA
- Formation: 1 January 2000; 26 years ago
- Type: Expert body
- Legal status: Active
- Headquarters: New York, United States
- Fields: Public administration
- Members: 24 members
- Parent organization: Economic and Social Council
- Website: publicadministration.un.org/en/CEPA

The United Nations Committee of Experts on Public Administration (CEPA) is an expert body that meets under the auspices of the United Nations Economic and Social Council in order to discuss and find ways to support the work of the Council by providing expert advice on matters concerning governance and public administration structures.

CEPA is composed of 24 members that meet annually for a one-week session at UN Headquarters in April.

== History and mandate ==
The Committee traces it roots back to a January 1967 meeting of experts in public administration convened by the Secretary-General in order to review the UN's program in public administration, as well as to make recommendations for the future direction of the organization in the field. The meeting made many recommendations to ECOSOC that it hoped would increase the UN's capacity in public administration:

- That in the second Development Decade (1971–80), public administration be accorded a priority place as an impact area
- That it would be desirable for the UN to elaborate more specific objectives and programs in the field of public administration
- That the United Nations Development Programme give sympathetic consideration to requests for assistance from governments of developing countries in the field of public administration
- That a separate section be created for public administration in the UN budget, or that funds be allocated for interregional and regional projects in public administration if that is not possible
- That the public administration unit at UN Headquarters be restored to the status of an independent substantive unit
- That public administration units be created in ECOSOC's regional commissions
- That the UN's program in public administration be reviewed by a Meeting of Experts every four years

On 24 May 1967, ECOSOC accepted the report of the Meeting of Experts and made several recommendations in the field of public administration. Among them were: to recommend that public administration be accorded an appropriate place in planning for the UN's second Development Decade, to request that experts in public administration be dispatched to its regional economic commissions, as well as to provide support to these commissions in the collection, analysis and exchange of technical information in the field of public administration and to convene the Meeting of Experts from time to time.

Meetings subsequently occurred in 1971 and 1975 as the Meeting of Experts on the United Nations Programme in Public Administration. In 1978, 1980, 1982, 1985, 1989, 1992 and 1994 as the Meeting of Experts on the United Nations Programme in Public Administration and Finance. And in 1995, 1997, 1998 and 2000 as the Meeting of the Group of Experts on the United Nations Programme in Public Administration and Finance.

At its 15th meeting in May 2000, the Meeting of the Group of Experts made several recommendations that were approved by ECOSOC on 27 July 2000. Among these recommendations the most important were: that the number of experts participating at its 16th session be maximized in order to increase geographical representation, that the Council review the status and reporting arrangements of the Group of Experts in order to reinforce their role due to the crucial importance of economic and social development issues relating to institutional and managerial development and that the UN establish appropriate mechanisms to provide the opportunity for ministers of Member States responsible for public administration to meet periodically.

On 20 December 2001, the Council adopted a resolution reorganizing the Group of Experts. As part of these changes, the Group was renamed the Committee of Experts in Public Administration, its membership was changed to 24 and it was required to meet biennially. It was mandated to provide expert policy advice and programmatic guidance to ECOSOC on issues relating to governance, public administration structures and processes for development.

The Committee also assists ECOSOC by reviewing trends, issues and priorities in public administration. In particular, the Committee plays a key role in helping monitor the implementation of the Sustainable Development Goals. At its annual meeting in 2018, the Committee developed the Principles of Effective Governance for Sustainable Development. These Principles are intended to help countries build effective, accountable and inclusive institutions at all levels, in the context of the 2030 Agenda. In order to achieve this, they take into account different governance structures, national realities, capacities and levels of development, and respect national policies and priorities.

== Members ==
Unlike most bodies of the UN, members of the CEPA meet in their personal capacity. They are nominated by the Secretary-General and approved by ECOSOC to serve four-year terms. When choosing nominees, the Secretary-General consults with Member States to find suitable candidates.

The current members of CEPA are as follow:

CEPA members 2021-2025
Name	Country	Position
Yamini Aiyar	India	Senior Visiting Fellow, Saxena Center & Watson Institute, Brown University
Rolf Alter	Germany	Senior Fellow, Hertie School of Governance
Patricia Arriagada Villouta	Chile	Former Deputy Comptroller General of the Republic of Chile
Linda Bilmes	United States	Senior Lecturer in Public Policy, Kennedy School, Harvard University
Augustin K. Fosu	Ghana	Professor, Institute of Statistical, Social and Economic Research, University of Ghana
Sherifa Fouad Sherif	Egypt	Professor, Cairo University; Executive Director, National Institute for Governance
Geraldine Fraser-Moleketi	South Africa	Chancellor, Nelson Mandela University
Paul Jackson	United Kingdom	Programme Director, British Academy; Professor, University of Birmingham
Aigul Kosherbayeva	Kazakhstan	Vice-Rector for Strategic Development, Academy of Public Administration
Ronald U. Mendoza	Philippines	Under Secretary, Department of Education, Republic of the Philippines
Louis Meuleman	Netherlands	Visiting Professor, KU Leuven; Senior Fellow, University of Massachusetts
Lamia Moubayed Bissat	Lebanon	Director, Institut des Finances Basil Fuleihan
Juraj Nemec	Slovakia	Professor, Masaryk University; President, NISPAcee
Katarina Ott	Croatia	Professor, University of Zagreb; Senior Research Advisor, Institute of Public Finance
Soonae Park	Republic of Korea	Professor, Graduate School of Public Administration, Seoul National University
Alketa Peci	Brazil	Vice-Dean and Professor, Getulio Vargas Foundation
Mauricio Rodas	Ecuador	Visiting Fellow, University of Pennsylvania; Former Mayor of Quito
Devon Rowe	Jamaica	Executive Director, Caribbean Centre for Development Administration
Carlos Santiso	France	Head of Division, Digital, Innovative and Open Government, OECD
Henry Sardaryan	Russian Federation	Dean, School of Governance and Politics, Moscow State Institute of International Relations
David Moinina Sengeh	Sierra Leone	Chief Minister and Chief Innovation Officer, Government of Sierra Leone
Aminata Touré	Senegal	High Representative of the President of the Republic of Senegal
Lan Xue	China	Dean, Schwarzman College, Tsinghua University
Najat Zarrouk	Morocco	Director, Development Branch, United Cities and Local Governments of Africa
Marta Eugenia Acosta Zúñiga	Costa Rica	Auditor General of the Republic of Costa Rica (resigned in 2021)
