= Greenfield Girls' Primary School =

Location
- 3 Gwalia Road, Kenilworth; Cape Town, Western Cape, 7708; South Africa; 33°59′19.5″S 18°28′11.5″E

Information
- Established: 1956
- Grades: Grade R - Grade 7
- Enrollment: 246
- Color: Green
- Slogan: Let us go joyfully upwards
- Website: greenfieldgirls.org.za

Greenfield Girls' Primary School is a public English medium primary school for girls in Cape Town, Western Cape, South Africa. Founded in 1956, the school was originally known as Claremont Girls’ Primary School but the name was changed later in the same year. Greenfield Girls' Primary School is located in the suburb of Kenilworth and is a quintile 5 fee paying school within the Western Cape Education Department's school system.
