= Claremont, Cape Town =

Claremont
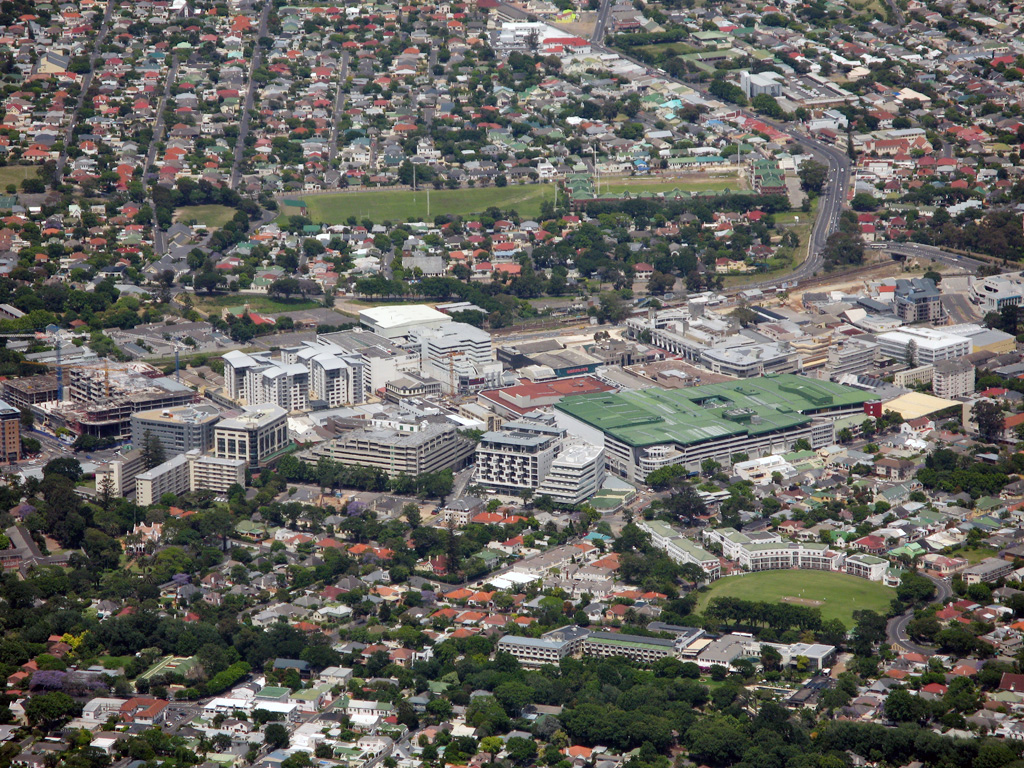
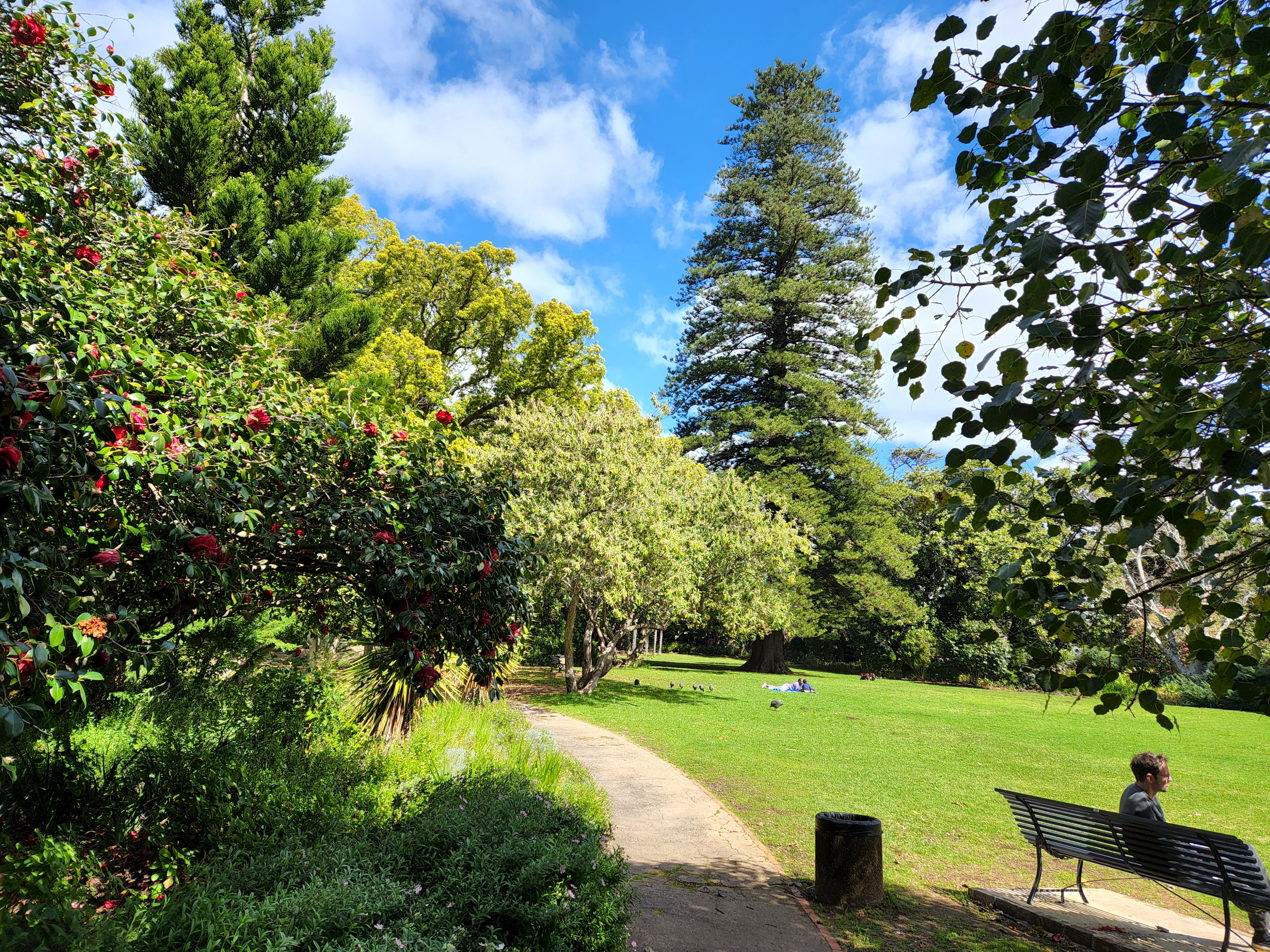
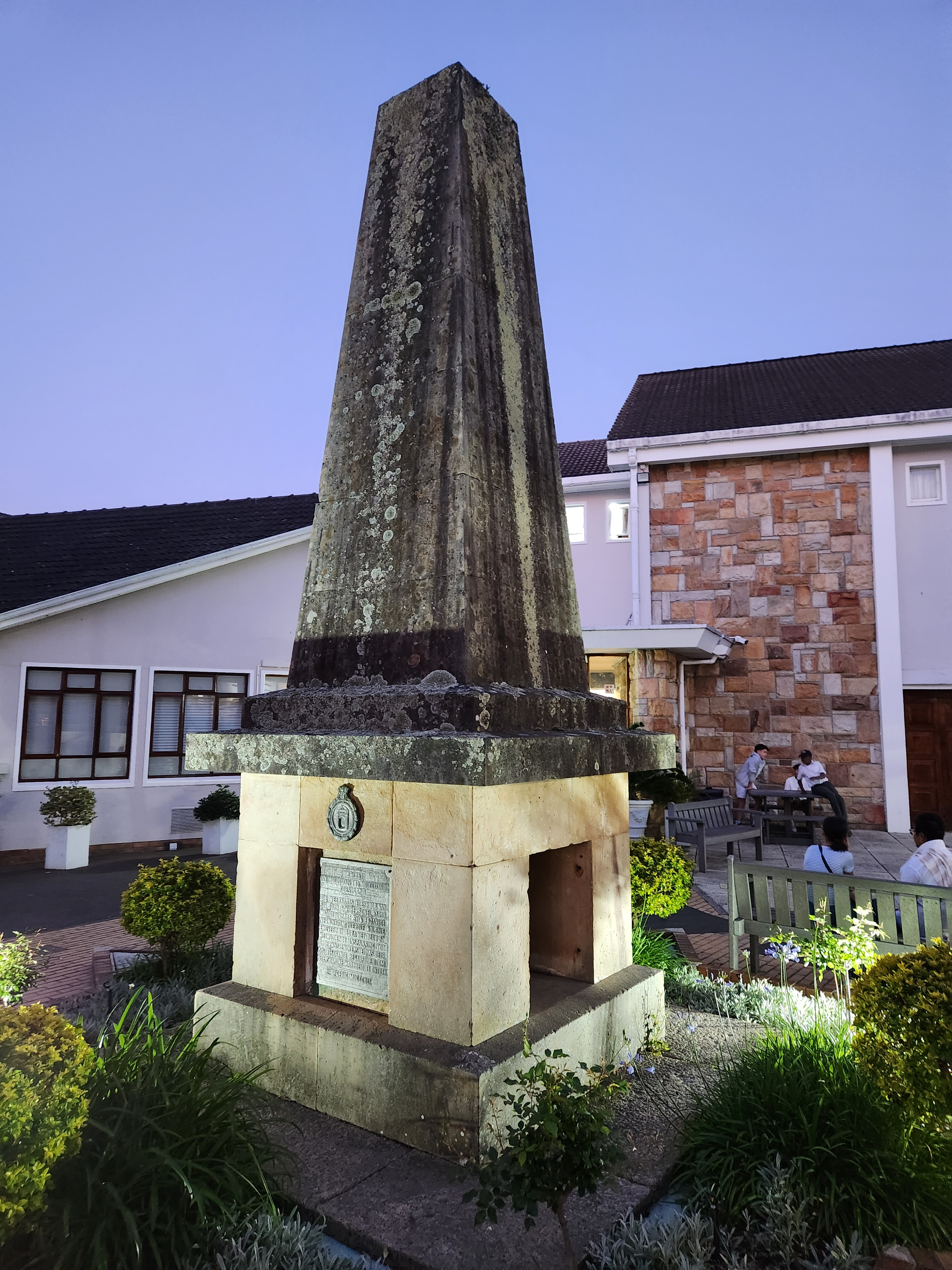
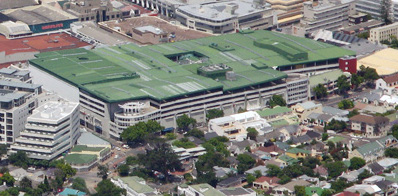
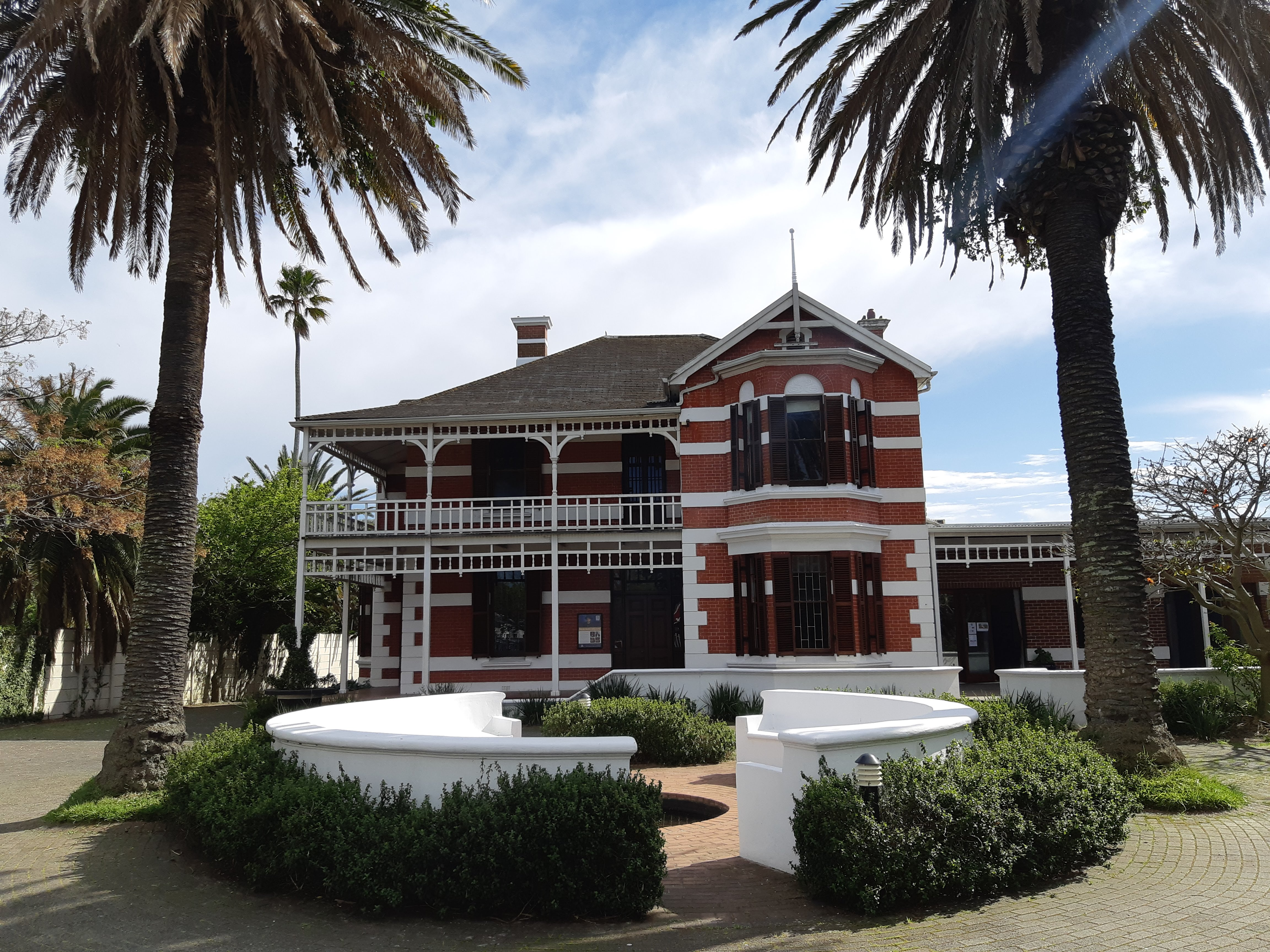
- Aerial view of Claremont's commercial centre in 2007 Arderne Gardens Herschel Obelisk Cavendish Square mall College of Magic
- Interactive map of Claremont
- Coordinates: 33°58′50″S 18°27′55″E
- Country: South Africa
- Province: Western Cape
- Municipality: City of Cape Town
- Main Place: Cape Town
- Established: 1835 as Claremont

Area
  - Total: 5.21 km^{2} (2.01 sq mi)

Population (2011)
  - Total: 17,198
  - Density: 3,300/km^{2} (8,550/sq mi)

Racial makeup (2011)
  - Black African: 16.8%
  - Coloured: 11.1%
  - Indian/Asian: 4.8%
  - White: 64.1%
  - Other: 3.2%

First languages (2011)
  - English: 83.4%
  - Afrikaans: 7.2%
  - Xhosa: 2.2%
  - Other: 7.2%
- Time zone: UTC+2 (SAST)
- Postal code (street): 7708
- PO box: 7735
- Area code: 021

Claremont is a suburb of Cape Town, South Africa, situated in the Southern Suburbs region of the city. It is a mixed-use area, with both residential properties and economically-important commercial sections.

The suburb contains numerous retail centers, including Cavendish Square, Stadium on Main, and Palmyra Junction.

== Etymology ==
The suburb is named after the Claremont House Estate, which was a prominent property in the area during area's early development in the early 19th century.

== Geography ==
Claremont is situated nine kilometers south of the city in the Southern Suburbs region of Cape Town. It is bordered by Newlands and Rondebosch to the north, Bishopscourt to the west, Kenilworth to the south, and Lansdowne and Rondebosch East to the east.

The M3 and M5 highways border the suburb to the west and east respectively, separating Claremont from Bishopscourt and Lansdown. The neighborhood is divided into the areas of Upper Claremont on its western half and Lower Claremont on its eastern half. The area of Lower Claremont is further subdivided into the areas of Lynfrae and Wyndover.

== History ==
Until the arrival of Dutch colonists in 1652, the uncultivated veld of the Cape Peninsula was used by the nomadic Khoikhoi as grazing for their cattle. The Dutch established an outpost on the shore of Table Bay, and in 1657 they established a number of farms south of the outpost. The most southerly of those original farms, named Louwvliet and Questenburg, are today covered by the suburbs of Claremont and Newlands.

The area was agricultural for about 150 years. Other estates that were established included Veldhuyzen in 1676, Stellenberg in 1697, Weltevreden (originally part of Stellenberg) in 1730, Sans Souci (originally part of Questenburg) in 1786, and The Vineyard in 1798. They produced grain and grapes, and some farmers made wine.

After the colony had been taken over by the British in 1814, the character of the area gradually changed from agricultural to residential. British settlers and officials bought the farms, renamed some of them, and turned them into country residences. Weltevreden was subdivided in 1822, and it was a portion of it that was later to be renamed Claremont.

The distinguished British astronomer Sir John Herschel put the area on the map by living at Feldhausen (formerly Veldhuyzen) from 1834 to 1838, where he conducted an important survey of the stars of the southern hemisphere.

=== Village (1840–1886) ===
A village began to develop on the main road near Feldhausen in the 1830s, and by 1840 it had become known as 'Claremont'. The annual Cape Almanac for 1840 described the area and stated that :

The new village of 'Claremont' succeeds, near to which, on the left, is 'Claremont House', the property of R. Waters Esq, who has lately laid out the grounds with much taste, in the manner usually known as the English style of landscape gardening.

The village grew during the 1840s and 1850s. Public transport consisted of horse-drawn omnibuses which plied along the Main Road from 1837 until the railway was opened in 1864. In 1845 the timber merchant Ralph Henry Arderne started work on what would become the Arderne Gardens.

The gardens, by then regionally renowned, were bought by the municipal government and turned into a public park in 1928.

In 1863, the Anglo-Italian immigrant and businessman John Molteno, who was later to become the Cape Colony's first prime minister, bought 140 acres of land centred on the Claremont House estate. The property was subdivided and developed from 1897 onwards, and Claremont House itself, situated in modern terms between Molteno Road to Pine Road, was later demolished. However its two extensions, Greenfield House and Barkly House, still stand today as schools.

The opening of the railway from Cape Town to Wynberg in 1864 spurred subdivision and development. The Feldhausen estate (also known as "The Grove") was subdivided in 1869–1870. A new Congregational Church was built on the Main Road in 1877. The Claremont Hall was opened in 1879.

The land along Lansdowne Road east of the railway line was subdivided and developed from 1882, creating a large residential area which is now known as "Harfield Village".

=== Municipality (1886–1913) ===
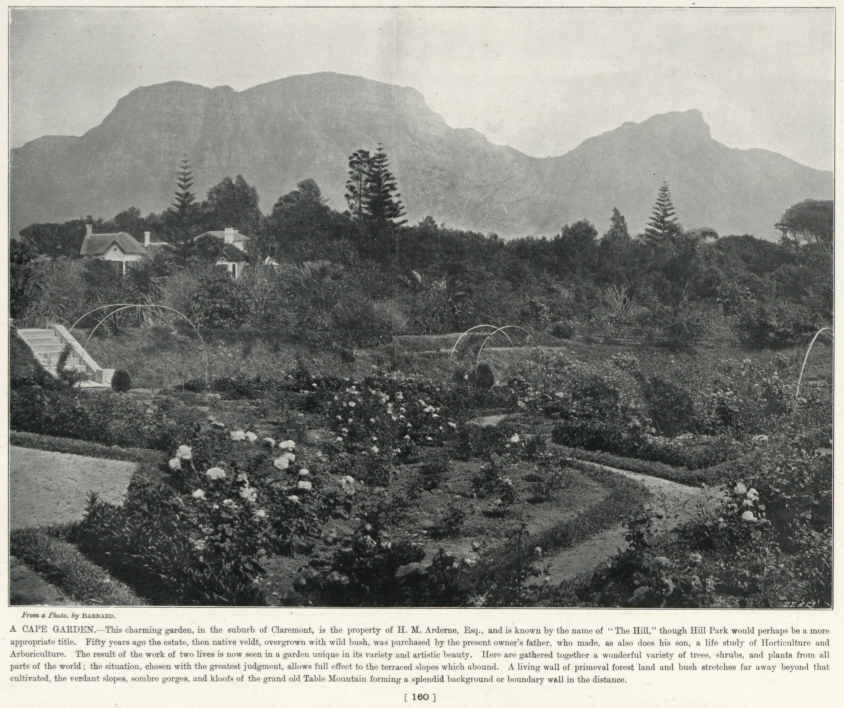
A suburban garden, later known as Arderne Gardens, in Claremont at the turn of the 20th century. In the late 1800s Claremont urbanised and became a municipality.

In 1882, a village management board was formed, and in 1886 it was replaced by the Municipality of Claremont, which managed neighbouring Newlands too. The privately owned Claremont Hall was taken over as a town hall. The first telephone system was installed in the early 1880s.

There was further residential development, with the subdivision of the Claremont House, Lansdowne, Milburn House, and Paradise estates in the 1890s. An electric tramway service was introduced in 1897, and an electricity power station was built in 1903. A 123 acre sanatorium on the eastern side of Belvedere Road, established with funding from the Seventh-day Adventists in the United States, operated from 1897-1905.

The housing boom which followed the Anglo-Boer War saw the subdivision of further estates in the 1900s. Most streets were named in 1903–1904, many of them thematically (e.g. after saints, explorers, British counties and towns, American presidents, and British politicians).

=== Suburb (1913–onwards ) ===
In 1913, Claremont and several other municipalities were incorporated into the City of Cape Town. Considerable residential growth took place in the 1920s and 1930s, when estates such as Palmyra, Keurboom, Ravensworth, Sanatorium Estate, The Vineyard, Wyndover, and Edinburgh Estate were subdivided and developed. An additional railway station, named "Harfield Road", was built in 1931.

The government enforced the apartheid Group Areas Act on Claremont in the 1960s, forcing the Coloured residents to leave. As a result, large areas of the suburb stood derelict for years thereafter.

Claremont remained predominantly residential until the early 1970s, when commercial development began, starting with the opening of Cavendish Square in 1972 as well as the now-closed Werdmuller Centre in 1975.

== Places of worship ==
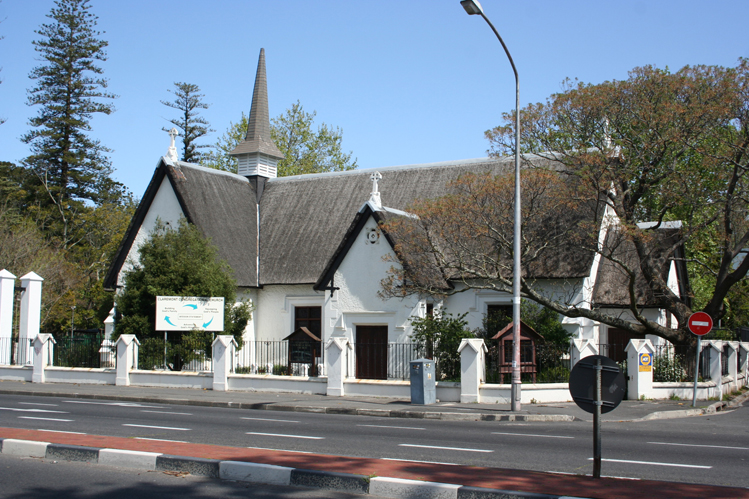
Claremont Congregational Church (founded in 1840, the present building dating from 1877) in 2010

Claremont places of worship, past and present:

- Claremont Congregational Church (1840- )
- Claremont Mosque (1851- )
- St Saviour's Church (Anglican) (1854- )
- St Matthew's Church (Anglican) (1888- )
- Claremont Methodist Church (1890s- )
- Salvation Army Claremont Temple (1898– )
- Claremont Baptist Church (1902- )
- Claremont Wynberg Hebrew Congregation (1904- )
- New Apostolic Church (1905- )
- Old Apostolic Church
- Harvey Road Mosque (1908- )
- Al-Jamiah Mosque (1911- )
- Seventh Day Adventist Church
- St Ignatius Church (Roman Catholic) (1930- )
- East Claremont Congregational Church (1932- )
- Christ the King (Anglican) (1941- )
- St Stephen's Church (Reformed Evangelical Church REACH SA - formerly Church of England) (1941- )
- Dutch Reformed Church (1941–1991)
- St Bernard's Church (Roman Catholic) (1955- )
- Christian Science Church (1959- )
- Assembly of God
- Church of the Nazarene (1975- )
- Bethany Fellowship Full Gospel Church
- School of Practical Philosophy

== Places of education ==
Schools in Claremont
Secondary or high schools	Livingstone High School • Claremont High School • Sans Souci Girls' High School
Primary or elementary schools	Grove Primary School • Claremont Primary school • Rosmead Central Primary School • Greenfield Girls' Primary School
Private schools	Herschel Girls School • Abbott's College • Western Province Preparatory School
Other schools	Talfalah Institute • Lady Buxton Children's Home • Oasis Association • Bel Porto School for Severely Mentally Handicapped • College of Magic
Defunct schools (date)	Mrs Harris's (later Mrs Midgley's) seminary (1840–1849) • St Saviour's Grammar School (1878–1885) • Batavia School
Formerly located in the area	Union College (1917-1971) • Barkly House (1945- )

== Economy ==
Claremont is the major commercial centre for the Southern Suburbs and a significant commercial node in Cape Town. Most commercial activity is located along Main Road (M4) where a number of shopping malls (most notably Cavendish Square), medical services, hotels, and companies involved in finance and real estate are located. A significant medical cluster exists around the Kingsbury Hospital and Maternity Home.

== Sport ==
Some Claremont sports clubs and facilities, past and present:

- Claremont Cricket Club (1867- ) – no longer in Claremont
- Kenilworth Racecourse (1882- ) – Kenilworth later became a suburb in its own right
- Violets Rugby Club (c1886- ) – moved to Crawford in the 1970s
- Villager Football Club (1875 -) – moved to Claremont from Mowbray in 1898.
- Claremont Swimming Baths (1895-1960s)
- Claremont Tennis Club (1908- )
- Rosmead Sports Ground (1921- )
- Cape Technical College Grounds (1927- )
- Ackerman's Sports Grounds (later Impala Park) (1920s-2000s)
- Celtic Harriers Athletics Club (1970- )

== Public amenities ==
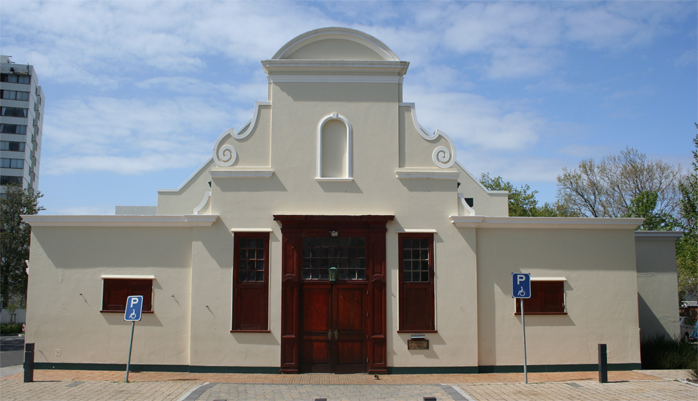
The Cape Dutch style Claremont Civic Centre in 2010

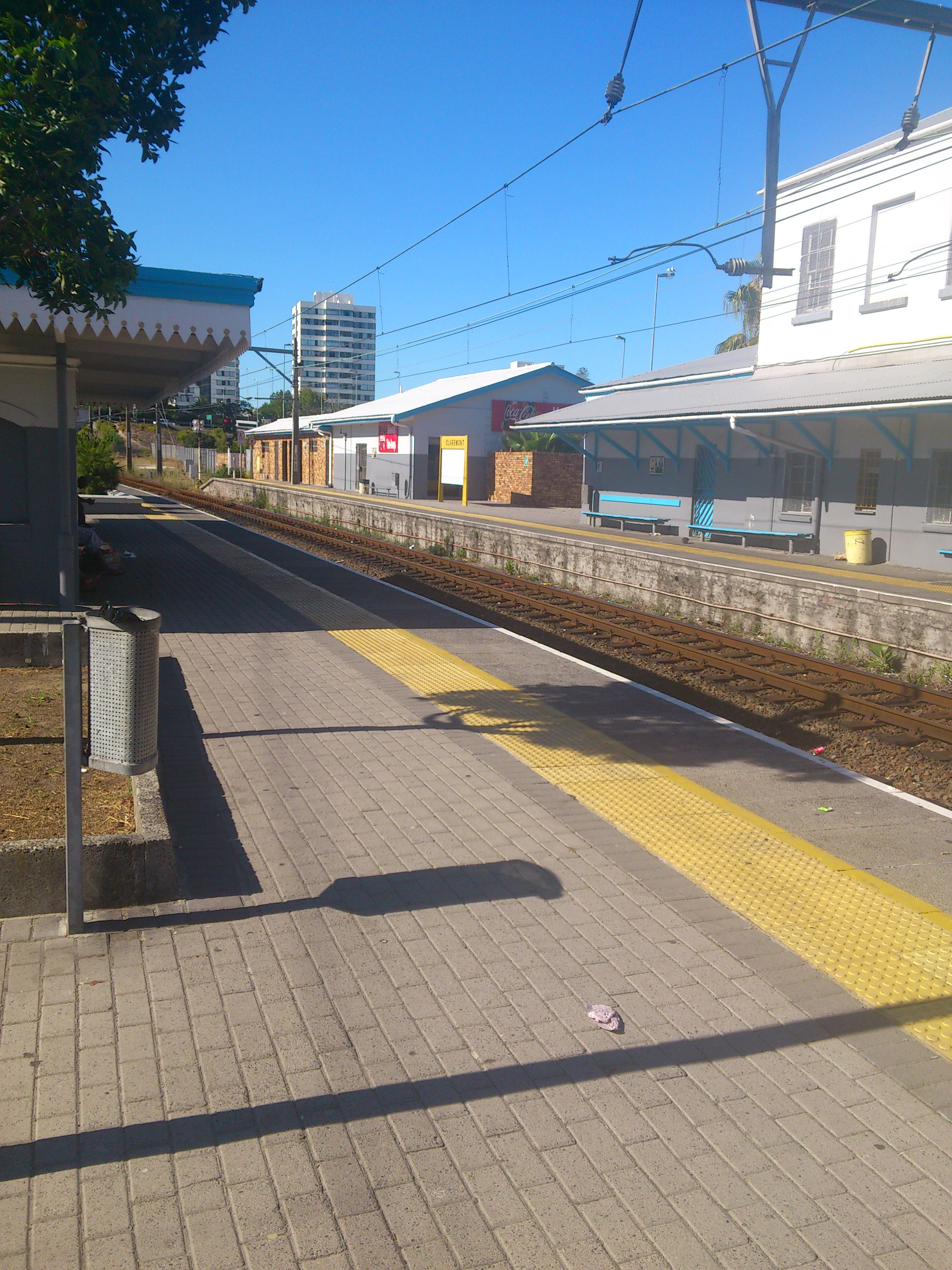
Claremont Train Station.

- Claremont Post Office (1846–2019)
- Claremont Town Hall (1879–1946)
- Claremont Library (1897- )
- Arderne Gardens (1928- )
- Clareinch Nurses' War Memorial Home (1934- ) – moved to Pinelands in the 1960s
- Janet Bourhill Institute (1944- ) – moved to Bonteheuwel in the 1970s
- Clareinch Post Office (1936- )
- Claremont Civic Centre (1960- )
