= Batho Pele =

South African political initiative

Batho Pele (Sotho-Tswana: "People First") is a South African political initiative. The initiative was introduced by the Mandela Administration on October 1, 1997, to stand for the better delivery of goods and services to the public. The Batho Pele initiative aims to enhance the quality and accessibility of government services by improving efficiency and accountability to the recipients of public goods and services.

Batho Pele requires that eight service delivery principles be implemented

- regularly consult with customers
- set service standards
- increase access to services
- ensure higher levels of courtesy
- provide more and better information about services
- increase openness and transparency about services
- remedy failures and mistakes
- give the best possible value for money.
