= List of Cape Town suburbs =

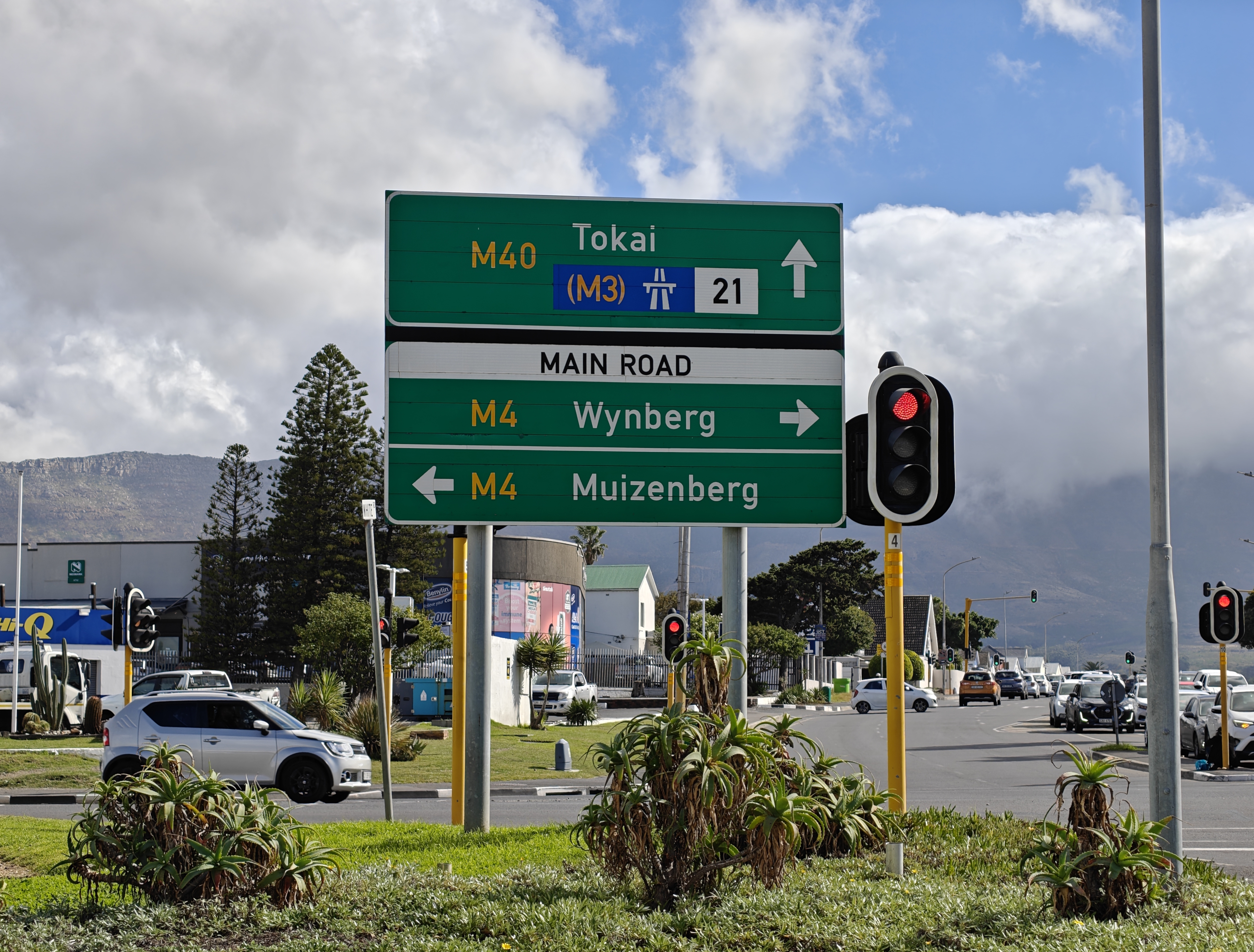
Road sign in Dreyersdal, a Southern Suburb of Cape Town

This is a list of suburbs in the City of Cape Town metropolitan municipality, in South Africa. The municipality includes the city of Cape Town, as well as its surrounding suburbs and exurbs.

Each section on this page separates a specific region of Cape Town, in alphabetical order. Within each region, there is a table, with its respective suburbs listed in alphabetical order.

In 2026, there were around 170 suburbs in the City of Cape Town.

The eight regions of the City of Cape Town are:

- The Atlantic Seaboard (11 suburbs)
- Blouberg (19 suburbs)
- The Cape Flats (39 suburbs)
- The City Bowl (16 suburbs)
- Helderberg (9 suburbs)
- The Northern Suburbs (35 suburbs)
- The Southern Suburbs (22 suburbs)
- The Southern Peninsula (18 suburbs)

In the tables, each suburb is followed by its postal code (street code). This code is used for street deliveries. The second, where applicable, refers to PO boxes. If a suburb's PO box code is the same as its postal code, or if it doesn't have a PO box code, the cell is blank.

Some suburbs in Cape Town are also classified as Main Places, and as such, certain suburbs may form part of those areas in the tables below.

In South Africa, the term "suburb" does not necessarily mean "residential area on the edge of a city". Rather, it is used synonymously with neighborhood, to refer to the smallest geographical subdivision of a city.

== Atlantic Seaboard ==
Suburb	Postal/Street Code	PO Box Code
Bakoven	8005	
Bantry Bay	8005	
Camps Bay	8005	8040
Clifton	8005	
Fresnaye	8005	
Green Point	8005	8051
Llandudno	7806	
Mouille Point	8005	8001
Sea Point	8005	8060
Three Anchor Bay	8005	
V&A Waterfront	8001	

== Blouberg ==
Suburb	Postal/Street Code	PO Box Code
Atlantis	7349	
Bloubergstrand	7441	
Brooklyn	7405	
Century City	7441	
Dunoon	7441	
Duynefontein	7441	
Joe Slovo Park	7441	
Killarney Gardens	7441	
Mamre	7349	
Melkbosstrand	7441	
Milnerton	7441	7435
Montague Gardens	7441	
Paarden Eiland	7441	
Parklands	7441	
Rugby	7405	
Sunningdale	7441	
Summer Greens	7441	
Table View	7441	7439
Ysterplaat	7405	

== Cape Flats ==
Suburb	Postal/Street Code	PO Box Code
Athlone	7764	7760
Belhar	7493	
Bishop Lavis	7490	7490
Bonteheuwel	7764	
Crawford	7780	7770
Crossroads	7755	
Delft	7100	
Elfindale	7945	
Elsie's River	7490	
Grassy Park	7941	7800
Gugulethu	7750	
Hanover Park	7780	
Heideveld	7764	
Joe Slovo	7490	
Kalksteenfontein	7490	
Kenwyn	7780	
Khayelitsha	7784	7783
Langa	7455	7456
Lansdowne	7780	7779
Lavender Hill	7945	
Lotus River	7941	7805
Manenberg	7764	
Matroosfontein	7490	
Mitchells Plain	7785	7789
Mfuleni	7100	
Nyanga	7750	7755
Ottery	7800	7808
Pelican Park	7941	
Philippi	7750	
Retreat	7945	7965
Rondebosch East	7780	
Rylands	7764	
Southfield	7880	
Steenberg	7945	
Strandfontein	7798	
Valhalla Park	7490	
Vrygrond	7945	
Wetton	7780	
Zeekoevlei	7941	7800

== City Bowl ==
Suburb	Postal/Street Code	PO Box Code
Bo-Kaap (Malay Quarter)	8001	
Cape Town CBD	8001	8000
Devil's Peak Estate	8001	
De Waterkant	8001	
Foreshore	8001	
Gardens	8001	
Higgovale	8001	
Oranjezicht	8001	
Salt River	7925	
Schotsche Kloof	8001	
Tamboerskloof	8001	
University Estate	8001	
Vredehoek	8001	
Walmer Estate (District Six)	7925	
Woodstock (including Upper Woodstock)	7925	
Zonnebloem (District Six)	7925	

== Helderberg ==
Suburb	Postal/Street Code	PO Box Code
Croydon	7110	
Eerste River	7100	7103
Faure	7131	
Firgove	7130	7110
Gordon's Bay	7140	
Macassar	7130	7134
Sir Lowry's Pass Village	7130	7133
Somerset West	7130	7129
Strand	7140	7139

== Northern Suburbs ==
Suburb	Postal/Street Code	PO Box Code
Acacia Park	7405	
Bellville	7530	7535
Bellville South	7530	
Blackheath	7579	7580
Blue Downs	7100	7105
Bothasig	7441	
Brackenfell	7560	
Durbanville	7550	7551
Edgemead	7441	
Epping	7460	
Fisantekraal	7550	
Goodwood	7460	7459
Joostenbergvlakte	7570	
Kensington	7405	
Kraaifontein	7570	7572
Kuils River	7580	7579
Loevenstein	7530	
Maitland	7405	
Monte Vista	7460	7463
Ndabeni	7405	
Norwood	7500	
Panorama	7500	7506
Parow	7500	7499
Philadelphia	7304	
Pinelands	7405	7430
Plattekloof	7500	
Ravensmead	7493	
Richwood	7441	
Scottsdene	7570	
Sonstraal	7550	
Sonstraal Heights	7550	
Thornton	7460	
Tyger Valley	7530	
Welgelegen	7500	
Welgemoed	7530	

== Southern Suburbs ==
Suburb	Postal/Street Code	PO Box Code
Bergvliet	7945	
Bishopscourt	7708	
Claremont	7708	7735
Constantia	7806	7848
Diep River	7945	
Dennendal	7945	
Dreyersdal	7945	
Heathfield	7945	
Kenilworth	7708	7745
Kirstenhof	7945	
Marina da Gama	7945	
Meadowridge	7945	
Mowbray	7700	7705
Muizenberg	7945	7950
Newlands	7700	7725
Observatory	7925	7935
Plumstead	7800	7801
Rondebosch	7700	7701
Rosebank	7700	
Tokai	7945	7966
Westlake	7945	
Wynberg	7800	7824

== Southern Peninsula ==
Suburb	Postal/Street Code	PO Box Code
Capri Village	7975	
Clovelly	7975	
Da Gama Park	7975	
Fish Hoek	7975	7974
Glencairn	7975	
Hout Bay	7806	7872
Imizamo Yethu	7806	
Kalk Bay	7975	7990
Kommetjie	7975	7976
Lakeside	7945	7946
Masiphumelele	7975	
Noordhoek	7975	7979
Ocean View	7975	
Scarborough	7975	
Simon's Town	7975	7995
St James	7945	7946
Sunnydale	7975	
Sun Valley	7975	7985
