= Gangs in South Africa =

South African gangs

The history of gangs in South Africa goes back to the Apartheid era.

Many South African gangs began, and still exist, in urban areas. This includes cities like Cape Town, Durban, Port Elizabeth and Johannesburg. Cape Town has between 90 and 130 gangs with the South African Police Service stating a total estimated membership of 100,000.

== History ==
=== Western Cape ===
Gangs in South Africa have historically been targeted by the state through a combination of security measures and development strategies, often resembling counterinsurgency tactics aimed at maintaining control over marginalized communities. Gangs rose to prominence in South Africa as a result of the Group Areas Act, which evicted “non-white” South Africans from their homes and resettled them in rural and underdeveloped areas far from urban and economic centres. This caused an increase in poverty and unemployment in Black and Coloured communities, most notably amongst those in the Cape Province (modern day Western Cape, Northern Cape and Eastern Cape) where Coloureds were and are still the largest racial group.

In the 1960s and 1970s, Coloured residents of Cape Town started forming gangs in the Cape Flats and other non-white areas. This is due to the breakdown of social control of the inner city, which caused severe unemployment, poverty and social marginalization. Former multi-racial suburbs of Cape Town, such as District Six, were either purged of unlawful residents or demolished. The Globe is often cited as the first gang in Cape Town but it started as a neighbourhood watch in District Six.

In 2013, 12% of the 2,580 murders in the Western Cape were gang-related, which was an 86% increase from 2012. Children as young as the age of 14 were arrested on gang-related murder charges. In 2019, 900 people were murdered in the first half of the year in communities in the Cape Flats in the Western Cape; by 2022 it was reported that the Black Axes gang had started operating in Cape Town.

=== KwaZulu-Natal ===
KwaZulu-Natal is home to the number gangs and section organizations. In the province of KwaZulu-Natal gangs have put themselves in a situation where they are regarded more as neighbourhoods rather than gangs. Townships were built by the Apartheid government as part of the Group Areas Act of 1950 which later gave birth to section organizations. Among these section organizations are hostels, that gained popularity during IFP-ANC conflicts for political power during the 1980s-2000s. One of the most infamous hostels is the Glebelands Hostel situated in Umlazi and KwaMashu Hostel also known as eziMpohlweni in KwaMashu. The oldest hostels date back to the early 1900s such as Dalton Hostel in the Durban CBD built in 1934. Some Hostels around Gauteng are also occupied by people from KwaZulu-Natal due to the displacement of people according to their political alliance during the conflicts.

=== Rest of South Africa ===
In Johannesburg in the mid-1950s and early 1960s, many Black African communities were relocated and resettled, in Soweto in the Meadowlands and Diepkloof.

By the early 1960s, gang violence had escalated, which was counteracted by more policing and patrolling of non-white areas.

Nowadays, gangs continue to contribute to school violence across multiple provinces in South Africa, including Gauteng, North West, and Mpumalanga, where they pose serious challenges to school safety and significantly impact students' ability to learn in a secure environment.

== Typology ==
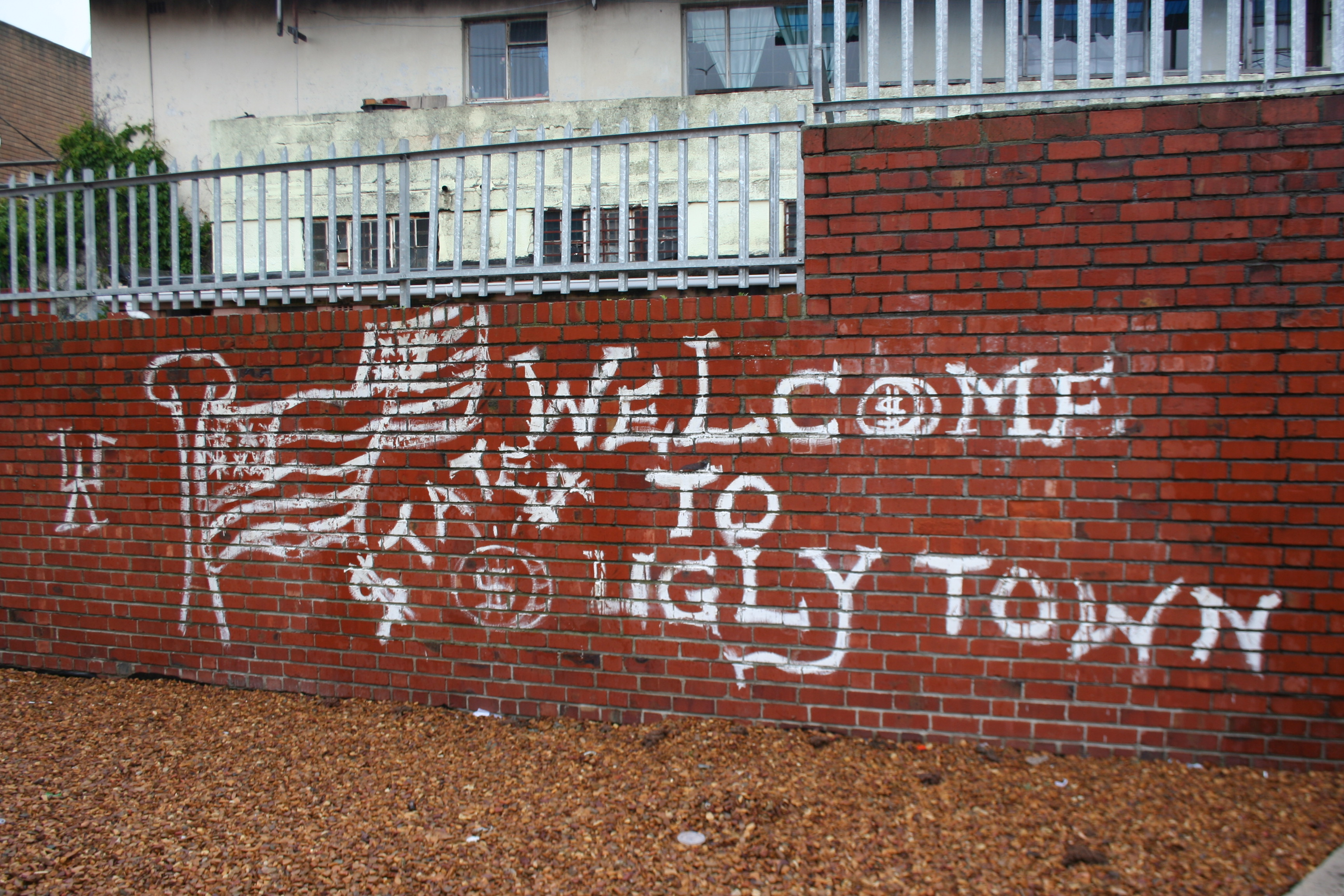
A large gang tag claiming control of the surrounding area for the Ugly Americans gang, a sub gang of the Americans gang, in Cape Town.

The Safety Lab has identified four distinct categories that Cape Town-based gangs can be divided into: Street gangs, Crews, Cliques, and Prison gangs.

=== Street gangs ===
The largest and best-known gang type in Cape Town is the street gangs that are mostly associated with poorer Coloured communities. They tend to have hierarchical command structures and are thought to derive most of their income from the illicit drug trade. In Cape Town, the two largest gangs are The Americans and the Hard Livings. These gangs function as umbrella organisations for many smaller gangs that are allied with the two super gangs. Smaller gangs in Cape Town that might be allied to one of the two larger umbrella gangs include Young Dixie Boys, Clever Kids, Naughty Boys, the Junky Funky Kids,1400 EstateBoyz, Respectable Peacefuls, Wonder Kids, School Boys and Yuru Cats.

=== Prison gangs ===
Prison gangs in South Africa consist mostly of the Numbers Gangs discovered in the province of KwaZulu-Natal, a grouping of prison-based gangs named after the different numbers they are named after; namely the 26s, 27s, and 28s. These gangs tend to be highly structured with strong hierarchical command structures and high levels of organizational. Their main focus is on money gains.
