= Clayton Daniels =

South African soccer player

Personal information
- Full name: Clayton Michael Daniels
- Date of birth: 10 July 1984 (age 42)
- Place of birth: Bishop Lavis, Cape Town, South Africa
- Height: 1.83 m (6 ft 0 in)
- Position: Central defender

Senior career*
Years	Team	Apps	(Gls)
2006–2011	Ajax Cape Town	167	(6)
2011–2013	Mamelodi Sundowns	130	(1)
2013–2014	Bloemfontein Celtic	126	(0)
2014–2020	SuperSport United	147	(12)
2020–2022	Maritzburg United	35	(1)
2022–2024	Cape Town Spurs	38	(1)
2024–	Crystal Palace		

International career^{‡}
2015–2017	South Africa	12	(0)
- * Club domestic league appearances and goals as of 13 October 2024 ‡ National team caps and goals as of 7 October 2022

Clayton Daniels, previously Clayton Jagers, (born 10 July 1984) is a South African soccer player who played as a defender.

He was born in Bishop Lavis on the Cape Flats.

Daniels left Cape Town Spurs in March 2024; the 2023–24 season saw the club relegated. He turned 40 in July, but initially did not want to retire before the age of 42.

Daniels joined Crystal Palace, from Manenberg, in December 2024.

== Honours ==
SuperSport United

- Nedbank Cup: 2016, 2017
- MTN 8: 2017, 2019
- Telkom: 2014
