= Welgelegen, Cape Town =

Suburb of Cape Town, South Africa

Welgelegen
- Suburb
- Interactive map of Welgelegen
- Coordinates: 33°52′31.727″S 18°34′6.886″E
- Country: South Africa
- Province: Western Cape
- Municipality: City of Cape Town
- Main place: Cape Town

Government
  - Councilor: Cheryl Visser (Democratic Alliance)

Area
  - Total: 2.06 km^{2} (0.80 sq mi)

Population (2011)
  - Total: 5,276
- Includes Welgelegen 1–3
- Time zone: UTC+2 (SAST)
- Postal code: 7500
- Area code: 021

Welgelegen is a suburb of Cape Town, South Africa, and part of the city's Northern Suburbs region. It is primarily residentially zoned.

== Geography ==
Welgelegen consists of three distinct sub-areas, numbered 1 through 3, located one below the other in descending order. To the area's north is Kleinbosch and to its south is Panorama. To the west is Edgemead and Monte Vista and to the east is Plattekloof.

== Housing ==
As of the 2011 census, Welgelegen had 5,276 people living across 1,533 homes, for an average household size of 3.44. Around 78% of residents owned their home.

In 2026, the average price of a detached house in the suburb was approximately R4.24 million.

== Transit ==
Welgelegen is flanked by the M14 (Plattekloof Drive) to the east, and by the M12 (Giel Basson Drive) to the west. The suburb is located near the N1 freeway, which passes nearby to its south.

The nearest MyCiTi BRT route runs through Summer Greens, to the west of Edgemead. The network's nearest station to Welgelegen is Century Station, approximately 10km away.

== Education ==
Panorama Primary School sits within Welgelegen itself, and there are numerous educational institutions nearby, including Edgemead Primary, Edgemead High, Mountain View Academy, Oakland Academy, Bothasig High, Curro Century City, and Curro Burgundy.

== Demographics ==
As of the 2011 census, 52.5% of Welgelegen residents are female and 47.5% are male. The largest age categories for residents are 20 through 24 and 50 through 54. A total of 59% of Welgelegen residents speak Afrikaans as their first language, followed by English at 38%.

== Commerce ==
Nearby shopping locations to Welgelegen include Plattekloof Shopping Center, Plattekloof Village, Bothasig Square, N1 City Mall, and Canal Walk.

== Governance ==
Along with numerous neighboring suburbs, Welgelegen forms part of the City of Cape Town's Ward 1, and is represented by Councilor Cheryl Visser of the Democratic Alliance.
