= Tooth ablation =

Deliberate removal of a person's healthy teeth

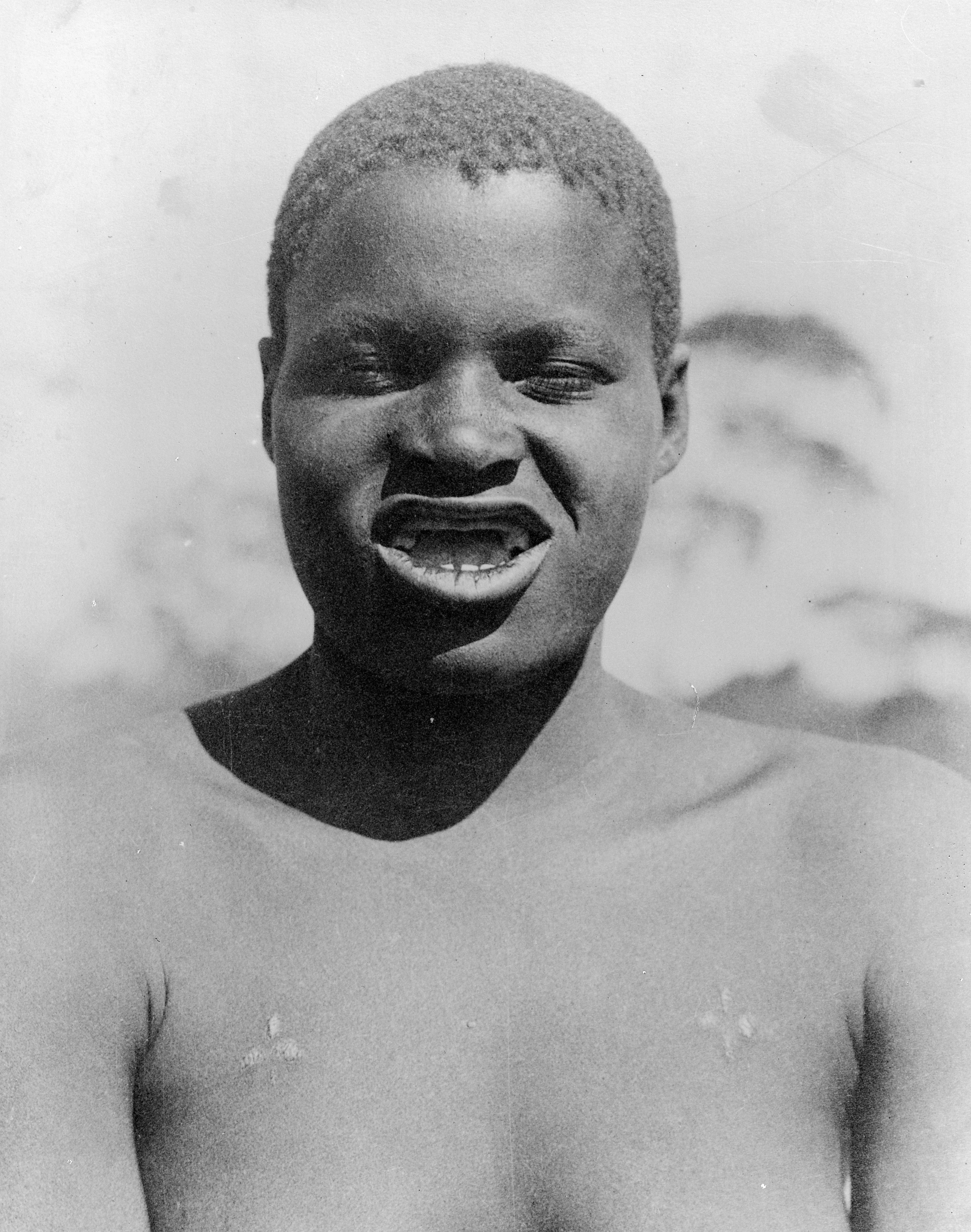
A BaTonga woman with extracted front teeth, for beauty purposes.

Tooth ablation (also known as tooth evulsion, dental evulsion and tooth extraction) is the deliberate removal of a person's healthy teeth, and has been recorded in a variety of ancient and modern societies around the world. This type of dental modification is visually very striking and immediately obvious to other people from the same or different communities. There are numerous reasons for performing tooth ablation, including group identification, ornamentation, and rites of passage such as coming of age, marriage and mourning. The social meaning of tooth evulsion is likely to remain unknown for ancient populations and may have changed over time within those groups. Dental evulsion can significantly affect the emergence, occlusion and wear patterns of the remaining teeth.

== Procedure ==
There are various techniques used to perform dental evulsion; however, regardless of the technique, dental evulsion could not have been achieved without causing pain and a risk of infection. In Hawaii, incisors were knocked out with a stick and rock, which frequently resulted in the presence of residual roots within the jaw. In Africa, extractive techniques were used. In Sudan, fish hooks and metal wires were used to remove deciduous tooth germs before an infant reached one month. In the Upper Nile, the entire tooth was removed by loosening the anterior teeth from their sockets with an iron spike. The Nuer people of South Sudan still practice an extractive technique whereby a fine blade is used to loosen the teeth alongside the root, which takes place without anesthetic and the individual is not allowed to show emotion or pain.

The evulsion of the lower teeth would have resulted in a highly visible change to the individual's facial characteristics and would also have affected the pronunciation of language and other sounds.

== Occurrence ==
=== Africa ===
Dental evulsion was at one time a common practice in Africa, especially in East and East Central Africa. In West Africa the custom of extraction is rather uncommon, but it was found among the Ashanti who broke teeth out of their war prisoners, and a few tribes in Cameroon, Ghana, Togo and Liberia. Dental evulsion also occurred in Angola and Namibia. In Kenya, Tanzania and South Sudan, dental evulsion is mainly a Nilotic custom. In South Sudan, lower incisors (and sometimes also the canines), are extracted shortly after their eruption, as a rite of passage, for beauty, to allow the emission of specific linguistic sounds and to facilitate oral sex. This is found among the Dinka, Nuer and Maban tribes and especially in rural villages. The Luo people extract the six lower teeth as a form of initiation into adulthood. The Maasai people of Kenya extract the lower deciduous incisors of infants at six months, and the lower permanent incisors at six years; this is performed only for boys to facilitate feeding them in case they are ill with tetanus, and to exorcize the kidnapping of babies. In Cape Town, South Africa, dental evulsion occurs often as a rite of passage for both Black and White South African teenagers, almost exclusively among families of low socio-economic status. The people of the Cape Flats have been performing dental modification for at least 60 years, by removing their incisors. South African Coloureds are known for removing their anterior teeth, which is popularly believed to be a facilitation for oral sex, called a "passion gap" or "Cape Flats Smile". Other reasons are fashion, peer pressure and gangsterism. The practice has become more popular in the last few years, even though dentists do not support the removal of healthy teeth. Therefore, South African dentists have applied thousands of partial dentures in patients who need an acceptable look at work or on special occasions.

=== Asia ===
In Asia, tooth extraction and mutilation have been recorded in Central Sulawesi, eastern Guizhou, French Indochina and Sumatra, and also in Northern Formosa. Archeological evidence shows that peoples in Formosa and in mainland China practiced tooth extraction before the time that the Austronesian peoples dispersed from there. In Indonesia, the teeth that are most commonly removed in such rituals are the incisors. The teeth to be removed are either struck with a hammer-like tool or jerked to the side with a lever-like tool to loosen them, before being extracted. Among the Uma people of Central Sulawesi, all of a young girl's incisors (four upper and four lower) were removed in the rite of passage called (Uma: mehopu’), which was performed at the beginning of puberty. The Dutch colonial government banned this rite around the beginning of the 1920s, and the practice had almost died out by the 1940s. In Borneo, dental evulsion is performed because of magical-religious beliefs, to allow feeding in case one is ill with tetanus, or to allow a stronger blast when using the sumpitan, which increases the thrusting power of poisoned arrows.

=== Oceania ===
Dental evulsion has been performed in the Marquesas Islands and Hawaii, where it was performed when a tribal leader died.

In some Aboriginal Australian tribes, dental evulsion is a very common practice as a rite of passage or as a sign of mourning. Many Aboriginal Australian boys have a tooth knocked out in puberty. The Uutaalnganu people of the Cape York Peninsula performed a complex of customs relating to tooth evulsion, which was related to moiety membership. Before or during puberty, young people underwent evulsion of an upper incisor tooth. The right incisor would be extracted for a righthanded person, and the left incisor for a lefthanded person. The operator of the procedure came from the mother's (i.e. the opposite) moiety. Some older Uutaalnganu people still alive today underwent tooth evulsion, but the custom is no longer practiced.

In the New Hebrides the two upper central incisors are removed in puberty. This is performed only for girls, as a sign of entrance into adulthood and a sacrifice made to represent the value of death in suffering, to pay the price for progressing socially from being a girl to becoming a woman.

== See also ==
- Human tooth sharpening
- Teeth blackening
