= Rashied Staggie =

South African gangster (1961–2019)

Rashied Staggie (1961 - 13 December 2019) was a South African gangster and leader of the Hard Livings gang. He was shot and killed in Salt River on 13 December 2019, in Cape Town, South Africa. His twin brother, Rashaad Staggie, the initial leader of the Hard Livings gang, was killed after being shot and burned alive in Salt River in 1996 by members of the vigilante group PAGAD. The Staggie brothers were killed in the same street, London Road.

In 2003, Rashied Staggie was sentenced to jail after he was convicted for ordering the gang rape of a 17-year-old girl who had turned state witness against him. Staggie was sentenced to 15 years for kidnapping and rape. In 2004, he was convicted of burglary from the Faure police armoury and sentenced to 13 years in prison. The two sentences were served concurrently. In May 2013 the Western Cape department of correctional services announced that Staggie would be released on parole for good behaviour in late September 2013.

Staggie has been called "one of the last of the Cape Flats' OG's (old gangsters)" and through his tenure, the Hard Livings gang had grown internationally, even being interviewed by the BBC. The Staggie brothers were the main subjects in a BBC documentary called Beloved Country - Cape of Fear. It is through this documentary that the brothers got international attention.

== Early years ==
Rashied and his twin brother Rashaad were born in Mooirivier in 1961. The Group Areas Act created forced removals of coloured peoples from so called white areas to a less desirable part of town. The Cape Flats became a place where more than a million displaced coloured and black people were relocated. Rashied's family were moved to Manenberg, poverty stricken and without access to proper infrastructure and services. Due to the pressures of this poverty and hard living, Rashied and his brother Rashaad resorted to petty crime for survival. After 1994 he stayed in Boston, Bellville, in the Western Cape South Africa.

== Criminal career ==
By the time the twins were teenagers they were drug dealers. As they got older they became more aggressive and influential in the Cape Town underworld. By the 1990s the twins were notorious gang leaders and their gang the Hard Livings had members all around the Cape Peninsula. The Hard Livings gang participated in crimes such as armed robbery, dealing of guns and drug distribution. Under the rule of Rashied Staggie, the Hard Livings took part in gang wars that led to a bloodbath in the streets of Cape Town thereafter stopped by the intervention of the Rasool Family Mafia Organization.

== Death ==
On the morning of Friday, 13 December 2019, Rashied Staggie was sitting in a friend's Toyota Corolla sedan outside his home in the area of Salt River, Cape Town when two assailants approached the vehicle and shot at him numerous times. He was confirmed dead on arrival at the nearby Groote Schuur Hospital. Staggie was 58 years old. According to an unnamed officer at the scene, the car was "riddled with bullets", but the driver of the car escaped unharmed after fleeing for safety. Staggie's daughter, Ingrid Carolus, came out of their house two hours after the shooting, screaming: "He's dead, he's dead!" The shooting occurred after another Hard Livings leader, Ballie Tips, was shot and killed in Mitchells Plain the previous night. Staggie was killed in the same street, London Road, where his twin brother and fellow gangster, Rashaad Staggie was shot and burned alive by People Against Gangsterism and Drugs (Pagad) members in 1996. No one has been arrested yet.
