= People Against Gangsterism and Drugs =

Violent South African vigilante group

- Type: Vigilante group
- Legal status: Active
- Location: Cape Town, South Africa
- Region served: Africa
- Website: www.pagad.co.za

People Against Gangsterism and Drugs (PAGAD) is a group formed in 1996 in the Cape Flats area of Cape Town, South Africa. The organisation came to prominence for acts against gangsters, including arson and murder.

== Origins ==
PAGAD was founded by a handful of Pan Africanist Congress of Azania (PAC) and community members from a Cape Town townships who decided to organize public demonstrations to pressure the government to fight the illegal drug trade and gangsterism more effectively. However, PAGAD increasingly took matters into their own hands, believing the police were not taking enough action against gangs. Initially the community and police were hesitant to act against PAGAD activities, recognising the need for community action against crime in the gang-ridden communities of the Cape Flats.

Notorious gangsters were initially asked by PAGAD members to stop their criminal activities or be subject to "popular justice". A common PAGAD modus operandi was to set fire to drug dealers' houses and kill gangsters. PAGAD's campaign came to prominence in 1996 when the leader of the Hard Livings gang, Rashaad Staggie, was beaten and burnt to death by a mob during a march to his home in Salt River. South Africa's police quickly came to regard PAGAD as part of the problem rather than a partner in the fight against crime, and they were eventually designated a terrorist organization by the South African government.

Changes within the organisation following the incidents of 1996 increased the influence of more highly politicised and organisationally experienced people within it associated with radical Islamic groups such as Qibla. This caused a series of changes such as the emergence of new leadership and the development of tighter organisational structures. This succeeded in transforming PAGAD from a relatively non-religious popular mass movement into a smaller, better organised but also a religiously radical isolated group.

The threat of growing vigilantism in 2000 led the Western Cape provincial government to declare a "war on gangs" that became a key priority of the ANC provincial government at the time.

== Cape Town bombings ==
Although PAGAD's leadership denied involvement, PAGAD's G-Force, operating in small cells, was believed responsible for killing a large number of gang leaders, and also for a bout of urban terrorism—particularly bombings—in Cape Town. The bombings started in 1998, and included nine bombings in 2000. In addition to targeting gang leaders, bombing targets included South African authorities, synagogues, gay nightclubs, tourist attractions, and Western-associated restaurants. The most prominent attack during this time was the bombing on 25 August 1998 of the Cape Town Planet Hollywood which resulted in two deaths and 26 injuries.

In September 2000, magistrate Pieter Theron, who was presiding in a case involving PAGAD members, was murdered in a drive-by shooting.

PAGAD's leaders have become known for making antisemitic statements. A 1997 incendiary bomb attack on a Jewish bookshop owner was found by police to have been committed with the same material PAGAD has used in other attacks. In 1998, Ebrahim Moosa, a University of Cape Town academic who had been critical of PAGAD, decided to take a post in the United States after his home was bombed.

Violent acts such as bombings in Cape Town subsided in 2002, and the police have not attributed any such acts to PAGAD since the November 2002 bombing of the Bishop Lavis offices of the Serious Crimes Unit in the Western Cape. In 2002, PAGAD leader Abdus Salaam Ebrahim was convicted of public violence and imprisoned for seven years. Although a number of other PAGAD members were arrested and convicted of related crimes, none were convicted of the Cape Town bombings.

== Current activities ==
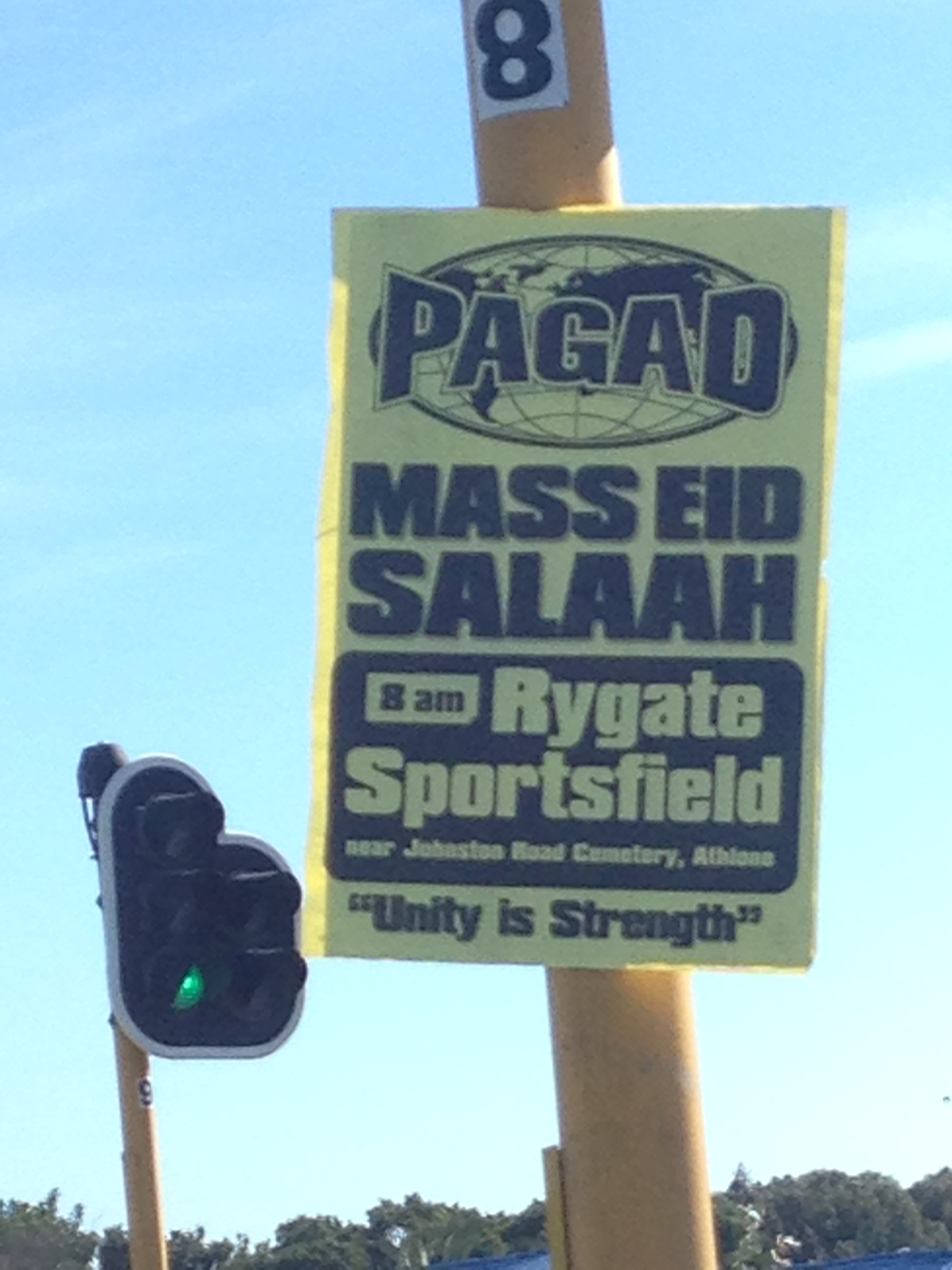
A poster put-up by PAGAD advertising a public event celebrating Eid in 2014.

Today, PAGAD maintains a small and less visible presence in the Cape Town Cape Muslim community.

In the run up to the 2014 South African general elections the organisation hosted motorcades and marches in Mitchell's Plain in February–March 2014. One of PAGAD's largest marches in 2014 was joined by the EFF, a far left political party who expressed their support for the organisation. In 2022, a PAGAD G-Force leader was charged with conspiracy to kill police officers. In 2023 a former PAGAD leader was gunned down.
