= Ziggy4x =

South african rapper and songwriter

- Born: Mogamad Zain Allie; Manenberg, Cape Town, South Africa
- Origin: Cape Town, South Africa
- Genres: Hip hop; Afrikaans drill; Trap
- Occupations: Rapper; Songwriter
- Years active: 2023–present

Mogamad Zain Allie (known as Ziggy4x) is a South African rapper and songwriter from Manenberg, Cape Town. His debut single Honne featuring Kulture Gang and AlwaysTheSuspect was released in January 2024.

== Career ==
Ziggy began his music career in early 2023. His debut single, Honne, with Kulture Gang and AlwaysTheSuspect, was released in January 2024 and received more than one million views on YouTube. In June 2024, he released Slat Los, featuring 25K and Loatinover Pounds. He was named Apple Music’s Up Next artist for October 2024.

On 8 November 2024, he released his debut EP, Gangsta Baby. The EP launch took place at Opera Lounge in Rosebank, Cape Town.

In November 2024, he faced legal issues when model Liam Vandiar sued him for R1 million, allegedly over a stabbing incident connected to the song Cape Town Thing.

== Discography ==
=== Extended plays ===
List of EPs
Title	EP details
Gangsta Baby	Release: 15 November 2024; Format: Digital download
