= Sonstraal Heights =

Suburb of Cape Town, South Africa

- Suburb
- Interactive map of Sonstraal Heights
- Coordinates: 33°50′35″S 18°40′46″E
- Country: South Africa
- Province: Western Cape
- Municipality: City of Cape Town
- Main place: Cape Town

Government
  - Councilor: Hendri Terblanche (Democratic Alliance)
  - Councilor: Gerhard Fourie (Democratic Alliance)

Area
  - Total: 2.41 km^{2} (0.93 sq mi)

Population (2011)
  - Total: 7,764
- Time zone: UTC+2 (SAST)
- Postal code: 7550
- Area code: 021

Sonstraal Heights is a suburb of Cape Town, South Africa, and part of the city's Northern Suburbs region.

== Geography ==
Sonstraal Heights is bordered by Sonstraal to the west, Pinehurst to the north, and Langeberg Ridge to the east. To the suburb's south is a large, empty plot of land that is part of Brackenfell North.

== Housing ==
As of the 2011 census, Sonstraal Heights had 7,764 people living across 3,387 households, for an average household size of 2.29 people. In the same census, in the broader Durbanville region, approximately 60.8% of households owned their home.

The area contains a mix of condos, townhomes, and detached houses. In 2026, the average price of a 2-bedroom condo in the suburb was R1.76 million, that of a 2-bedroom townhome was R2.94 million, and that of a 3-bedroom detached house was approximately R3.72 million.

== Transit ==
Sonstraal Heights is situated below the M15 (Langeberg Road), and flanked by the M124 and M137 municipal roads. The suburb is near the national N1 freeway, which runs to its southeast. The nearby regional R302 road runs from Bellville to the south, up through Durbanville, Fisantekraal, and eventually Malmesbury.

The area is not served by the MyCiTi BRT system, and the nearest station is in Century City, around 23km away.

== Education ==
Nearby schools include Gene Louw Primary, Durbanville Prep, Curro Durbanville, Fairmont High, Durbanville High, Eversdal Primary, and Kenridge Primary.

== Demographics ==
As of the 2011 census, 52.94% of Sonstraal Heights residents were female and 47.06% were male. The largest age category for residents was 25 through 29 years. A total of 65.28% of Sonstraal Heights residents spoke Afrikaans as their first language, followed by English at 30.24%.

== Commerce ==
While primarily residentially zoned, Sonstraal Heights contains a small amount of commercial zoning as well. Wiothin the suburb is Cobble Walk mall and the Ipic Shopping Center. Other retail locations nearby include Glengarry Shopping Center, CapeGate, Pinehurst Center, and the Village Square.

== Governance ==
Sonstraal Heights forms part of the City of Cape Town's Ward 21 and Ward 103, and is represented by Councilors Hendri Terblanche and Gerhard Fourie respectively, both members of the Democratic Alliance.
