= Roegchanda Pascoe =

South African anti-crime and violence proponent

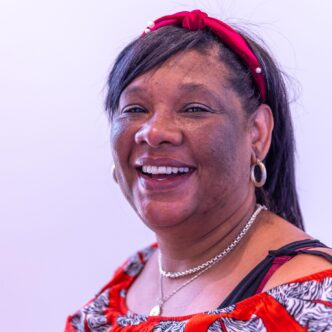
- in 2022
- Born: c.1975 South Africa
- Known for: International Women of Courage Award

Roegchanda Pascoe (c.1975-) is a South African who has stood up for her rights and campaigned against violence in the Cape Flats area. In 2022 she was recognised as an International Women of Courage Award by the US Secretary of State.

== Life ==
Pascoe was brought up in Retreat, Cape Town where violence existed in her neighbourhood and within her family. She was involved in the clothing industry and she was a student and union leader working for the rights of her peers.

She began living in Manenburg which is a neighbourhood within the area of Cape Town known as Cape Flats. In 2013 the Manenberg Safety Forum was formed and funded by a small group to work towards decreasing violence in their area. Her ex-husband was one of its financial supporters and she was elected as their chairperson. They began “Reclaiming Our Streets” trying to get rid of the gangsters and the drug dealers and they set up WhatsApp groups to report crime. Schoolchildren can be caught in crossfire and they organised lessons for children in how to react to a gunfight. They persuaded their local police station to set aside a room for victims of rape and domestic violence and this idea was copied by others.

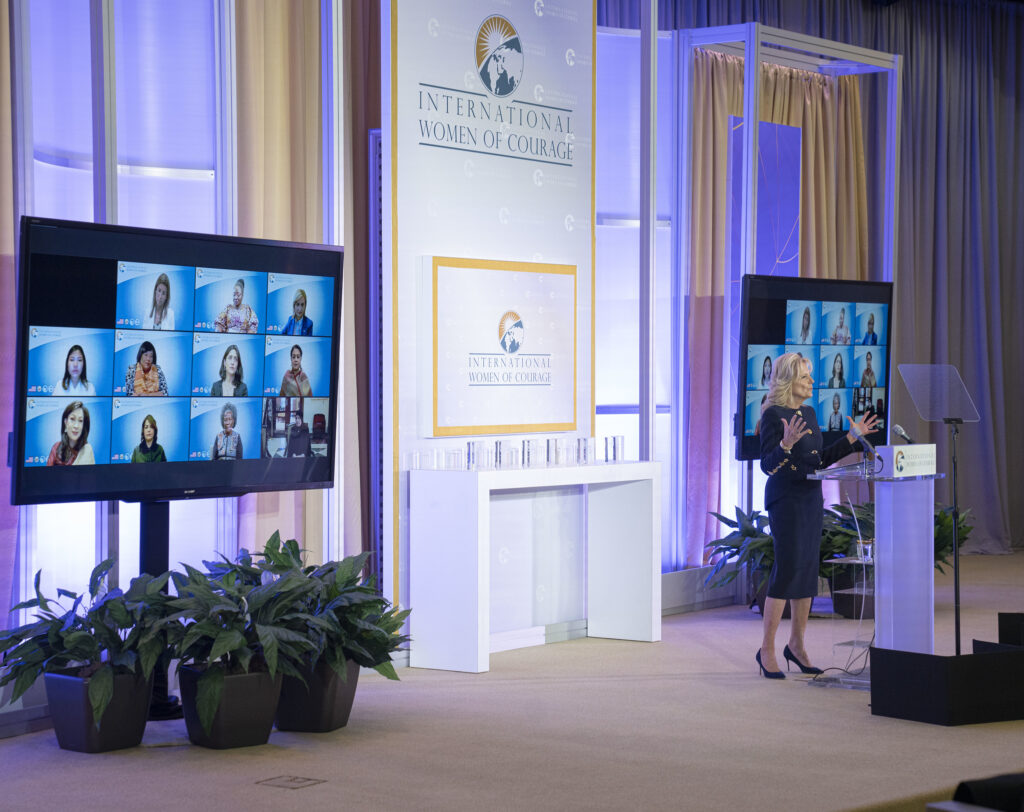
The 2022 (virtual) International Women of Courage

On 6 March 2019 she was phoned by her son-in-law. Unknown attackers had fired bullets through their flat. She had moved out earlier that day, but her children and grandchildren were sleeping there. No one was hurt but she knew this was a warning as she had witnessed a murder of Angelo Davids and she was willing to give evidence against the accused gang members. Her son-in-law, her daughters and grandchildren all moved into the safe house where she was staying. During that week she gave evidence in court against the gangsters accused of killing Angelo Davids. She was advised to never return to Manenburg.

In the same year she was sent to London as South Africa's representative as an anti-crime activist at the Global Initiative Against Transnational Organised Crime in London.

In March 2022 she was among twelve women chosen from different countries to receive an International Women of Courage Award. Because of the COVID-19 pandemic the awards were given virtually.
