= Disa hallackii =

Scientific classification
- Kingdom: Plantae
- Clade: Tracheophytes
- Clade: Angiosperms
- Clade: Monocots
- Order: Asparagales
- Family: Orchidaceae
- Subfamily: Orchidoideae
- Genus: Disa
- Species: D. hallackii

Binomial name
- Disa hallackii Rolfe

Synonyms
- Disa stokoei L.Bolus

Species of flowering plant

Disa hallackii is a perennial plant and geophyte belonging to the genus Disa and is part of the fynbos. The plant is endemic to the Eastern Cape and Western Cape and occurs from the Cape Flats to Port Elizabeth. The plant grows on the low parts of the coast. There are between eight and ten subpopulations remaining; the plant has lost its habitat to development and crop cultivation. None of the subpopulations consists of more than 150 individual plants and the total population consists of less than 1 000 plants. The plant is threatened by invasive plants, further development, maintenance of road shoulders and overgrazing.
