= Welgelegen =

Welgelegen (English: well situated) may refer to:

== Places ==
- Welgelegen, Cape Town, a suburb of Cape Town, South Africa
- Welgelegen, Paramaribo District, a resort in Suriname
- Welgelegen, Coronie District, a resort in Suriname

== Windmills ==
- Welgelegen, Heerenveen, Friesland
- Welgelegen, Veendam, Groningen

== Other meanings ==
- Villa Welgelegen, Haarlem, Netherlands.
