= Valhalla Park, Cape Town =

Valhalla Park
- Interactive map of Valhalla Park
- Coordinates: 33°57′11″S 18°34′17″E
- Country: South Africa
- Province: Western Cape
- Municipality: City of Cape Town

Government
  - Councillor: Theresa Thompson (DA)

Area
  - Total: 0.90 km^{2} (0.35 sq mi)

Population (2011)
  - Total: 15,458
  - Density: 17,000/km^{2} (44,000/sq mi)

Racial makeup (2011)
  - Black African: 4.1%
  - Coloured: 94.4%
  - Indian/Asian: 0.6%
  - White: 0.1%
  - Other: 0.8%

First languages (2011)
  - English: 6.8%
  - Afrikaans: 90.5%
  - isiXhosa: 1.1%
  - Setswana: 0.3%
  - Other: 1.3%
- Time zone: UTC+2 (SAST)
- Postal code (street): 7490
- Area code: 021

Valhalla Park is a residential suburb located on the Cape Flats in Cape Town, Western Cape, South Africa. According to the 2011 census, the suburb has a population of 15,458 residents with 2,576 households.

Valhalla Park was built in the 1980s during apartheid and designated by the white minority government to be a neighbourhood for Coloured people, who were forcibly removed from District Six. In modern times, the suburb continues to be plagued by gang violence, high levels of crime and poverty.
