= Plattekloof =

Suburb of Cape Town, South Africa

- Interactive map of Plattekloof
- Coordinates: 33°52′56″S 18°35′20″E
- Country: South Africa
- Province: Western Cape
- Municipality: City of Cape Town
- Main place: Cape Town

Government
  - Councilor: Cheryl Visser (Democratic Alliance)

Area
  - Total: 2.98 km^{2} (1.15 sq mi)
- Elevation: 127.2 m (417 ft)

Population (2011)
  - Total: 4,556
  - Density: 1,530/km^{2} (3,960/sq mi)
- Time zone: UTC+2 (SAST)
- Postal code: 7500
- Area code: 021

Plattekloof is an affluent suburb of Cape Town, South Africa.

Located in the Northern Suburbs region of the city, Plattekloof used to be part of the Parow municipal area, before Parow was amalgamated into the City of Cape Town metro. The land was also once part of the De Villiers Graaf family trust.

The area is residential, comprising mostly detached homes. It is split into three zones (Plattekloof 1, 2, and 3 from bottom to top). Plattekloof 3 is the largest, and contains some retail zoning, as well as a SAPS forensic lab and the Plattekloof Reservoir.

== Geography ==
Plattekloof is bordered by the suburbs of Sonnendal, Panorama, and Welgelegen to its west, Parow North to its south, the De Grendel Wine Estate to its north, and the lower part of the Tygerberg Nature Reserve to its east.

The suburb is named after its topography. Plattekloof means "flat ravine" in Afrikaans. However when the suburb was being named, town planners confused the names calling the area against the hill Plattekloof (flat ravine) and the adjacent suburb on the flat area at the foot of the hill Panorama (Beautiful view).

== Housing ==
The suburb comprises mainly detached homes. Many houses in the neighborhood are large, at 5 to 8 bedrooms, and sit on large plots of around 1,000 to 1,500 square meters.

2011 census data showed roughly 70% of the suburb's homes were owned, while approximately 20% were rented. As of April 2026, the price of a detached house in Plattekloof is around R12.6 million.

== Transit ==
Plattekloof is bordered on its southern side by the N1 freeway, one of SA's main national roads. The highway heads southwest towards Century City and Cape Town CBD. Plattekloof Road (M14), a main road in the area, runs all along the suburb's western border.

The suburb and surrounds are not serviced by the MyCiTi BRT system. However, there are plans to bring the network through the area as part of its Phase 3 expansion.

== Education ==
Schools nearby include Panorama Primary, Wolraad Woltemade Primary, Edgemead High, Tygerberg High, the Deutsche International Schule Kapstadt, and the Oaks Academy.

== Demographics ==
According to 2011 census data, there were 4,556 residents living across 1,473 households in Plattekloof. The average household size was therefore 3.09.

That same data showed that Plattekloof residents are 52% female and 48% male. The largest age categories for residents vary across zones, with 20 through 29 being the largest in Plattekloof 1, 50 through 54 in Plattekloof 2, and 30 through 34 in Plattekloof 3. English is the first language for 58% of Plattekloof residents. This is followed by Afrikaans, at 31%.

== Commerce ==
The suburb is home to the Plattekloof Shopping Center, and Plattekloof Village Shopping Center further east. Edgemead Village Center and the N1 City Mall are nearby.

== Governance ==
Plattekloof is part of Ward 1, and is represented by Councilor Cheryl Visser of the Democratic Alliance.
