= Hard Livings =

South African criminal gang

- The flag of the United Kingdom is often used as a symbol for the Hard Livings gang. This is in contrast to the American flag that the rival Americans gang uses.
- Founded: 1971
- Founding location: Manenberg, Cape Town
- Territory: Cape Town
- Ethnicity: Predominantly Cape Coloured and Xhosa
- Membership: 6 000
- Criminal activities: Drug trafficking, weapon trafficking, prostitution, contract killing, extortion, illegal diamond smuggling, robbery, fraud/corruption, money laundering, human trafficking, kidnapping
- Allies: Nigerian mafia, Triads, Sicilian Mafia
- Rivals: The Americans and other Cape Town gangs

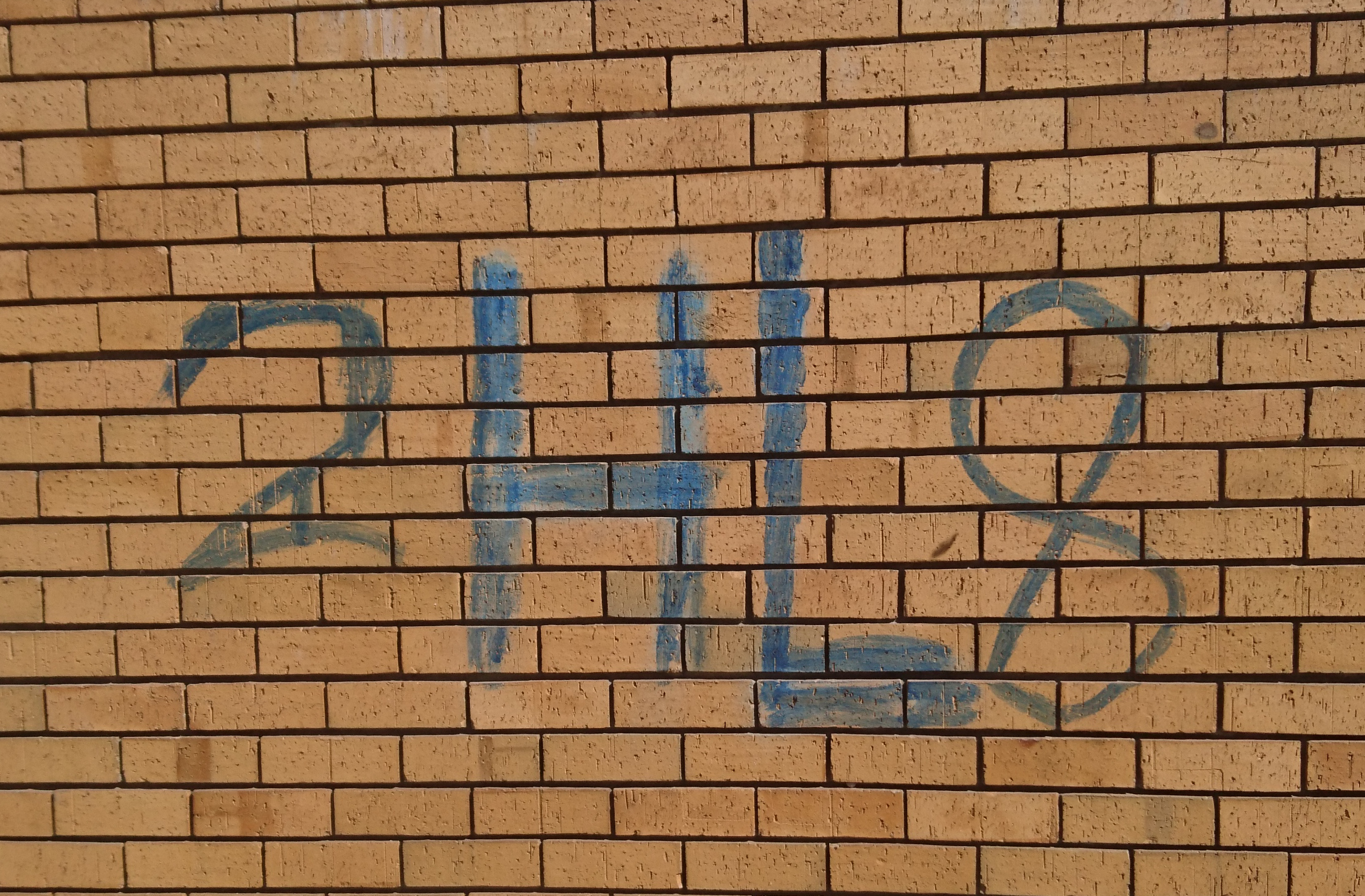
A combination of a Hard Living and 28s gang tags in Manenberg, Cape Town. The Hard Livings is a Cape Town based street gang whilst the 28s are a South African prison gang.

The Hard Livings gang is a large street gang and organized crime group based in Manenberg, Cape Town. A number of other smaller gangs form part of the Hard Livings gang and owe allegiance to it. The Hard Livings used to be one of two 'super gangs' in Cape Town with the other one being The Americans.

== History ==
The gang was formed in 1971 by Rashied Staggie and his twin brother Rashaad. The gang started out as a criminal street gang mostly involved in drug distribution for which they competed with the Americans gang. After their distribution network grew, the Hard Livings gang as well as their rivals evolved into a structured criminal organization involved in a wide range of criminal activities. In 1996 Rashaad was publicly set alight and killed by the vigilante group PAGAD. In December 2019, Rashied was shot and killed in the same street where Rashaad was killed.

In the 1990s, Cape Flats, a township outside Cape Town historically associated with the Coloured population, was home to around 80 gangs. The Hard Livings gang was the most prominent, led by a major drug figure who was later killed by the vigilante group People Against Gangsterism and Crime (PAGAD). Following his death, drug prices increased, while overall crime reportedly declined. During this period in the 1990s and early 2000s the gang was known to have had a strong presence in the wealthy Green Point and Sea Point areas of Cape Town.

The gang is known to have been involved in both international and local organized crime. Their local activities range from drug running & trading, poaching, protection rackets, prostitution and shebeening (provision of unlicensed drinking places). They have associations with Westbury gang, Varador Cortet. Internationally they have been known to have cooperated with the Sicilian mafia in the trafficking of illegal diamonds as well as trafficking cannabis to Europe.
