= Norwood, Western Cape =

Norwood
- Location within Western Cape Location within South Africa
- Coordinates: 33°56′S 18°34′E
- Country: South Africa
- Province: Western Cape
- Municipality: City of Cape Town

Area
  - Total: 0.53 km^{2} (0.20 sq mi)

Population (2011)
  - Total: 3,472
  - Density: 6,600/km^{2} (17,000/sq mi)

Racial makeup (2011)
  - Black African: 10.9%
  - Coloured: 86.5%
  - Indian/Asian: 1.0%
  - White: 0.3%
  - Other: 1.3%

First languages (2011)
  - Afrikaans: 65.8%
  - English: 30.8%
  - Other: 3.4%
- Time zone: UTC+2 (SAST)
- Postal code (street): 2192
- PO box: 2117

Norwood is a suburb of Cape Town, in the Western Cape province of South Africa.
