= Sonstraal =

Suburb of Cape Town, South Africa

- Suburb
- Interactive map of Sonstraal
- Coordinates: 33°50′40.259″S 18°39′48.900″E
- Country: South Africa
- Province: Western Cape
- Municipality: City of Cape Town
- Main place: Cape Town

Government
  - Councilor: Hendri Terblanche (Democratic Alliance)

Area
  - Total: 0.91 km^{2} (0.35 sq mi)

Population (2011)
  - Total: 1,737
- Time zone: UTC+2 (SAST)
- Postal code: 7550
- Area code: 021

Sonstraal is a suburb of Cape Town, South Africa, and part of the city's Northern Suburbs region.

== Geography ==
Sonstraal is bordered by Durbanville Golf Club to the north, Amanda Glen to the south, Sonstraal Heights to the east, and Valmary Park to the west.

A significant portion of the suburb consists of parkland. This includes Hanepoot Park, as well as the larger area below Vygeboom Road, part of which is the Sonstraal Dam.

== Housing ==
As of the 2011 census, Sonstraal had 1,737 people living across 581 homes, for an average household size of 2.99. In the same census, in the broader Durbanville region, approximately 60.8% of residents owned their home.

The suburb features large detached houses, sometimes with as many as six or seven bedrooms. In 2026, the average price of a detached house in the suburb was approximately R7.6 million.

== Transit ==
Sonstraal is situated near the national N1 freeway, which runs to its southeast. The nearby regional R302 road runs from Bellville to the south, up through Durbanville, Fisantekraal, and eventually Malmesbury.

The area is not served by the MyCiTi BRT system, and the nearest station is in Century City, around 22km away.

== Education ==
Sonstraal is home to numerous kindergartens. Nearby schools include Gene Louw Primary, Durbanville Prep, Curro Durbanville, Fairmont High, Durbanville High, Eversdal Primary, and Kenridge Primary.

== Demographics ==
As of the 2011 census, 50.75% of Sonstraal residents are female and 49.25% are male. The largest age category for residents is 50 through 59. A total of 64.41% of Sonstraal residents speak Afrikaans as their first language, followed by English at 33.39%.

== Commerce ==
Sonstraal itself doesn't contain major commercial zoning, however there are numerous shopping locations nearby, including Glengarry Shopping Center, Cobble Walk, CapeGate, Pinehurst Center, and the Village Square.

== Governance ==
Sonstraal forms part of the City of Cape Town's Ward 21, and is represented by Councilor Hendri Terblanche of the Democratic Alliance.
