= Sunnydale, Cape Town =

Suburb of Cape Town, in Western Cape, South Africa

Sunnydale
- Location in Greater Cape Town
- Coordinates: 34°7′26″S 18°23′15″E
- Country: South Africa
- Province: Western Cape

Area
  - Total: 1.54 km^{2} (0.59 sq mi)

Population (2011)
  - Total: 7,012

Racial makeup (2011)
  - Black African: 70%
  - Coloured: 2.55%
  - Indian/Asian: 0.41%
  - White: 24.01%
  - Other: 3%

First languages (2011)
  - English: 26.41%
  - Afrikaans: 4.85%
  - IsiXhosa: 60.46%
  - Other: 5.2%
- Time zone: UTC+2 (SAST)

Sunnydale is a suburb in Cape Town under the City of Cape Town Metropolitan Municipality in the Western Cape province of South Africa. According to the 2011 census, Sunnydale had a population of 7,012.
