= Parow, South Africa =

Suburb of Cape Town, South Africa

Parow
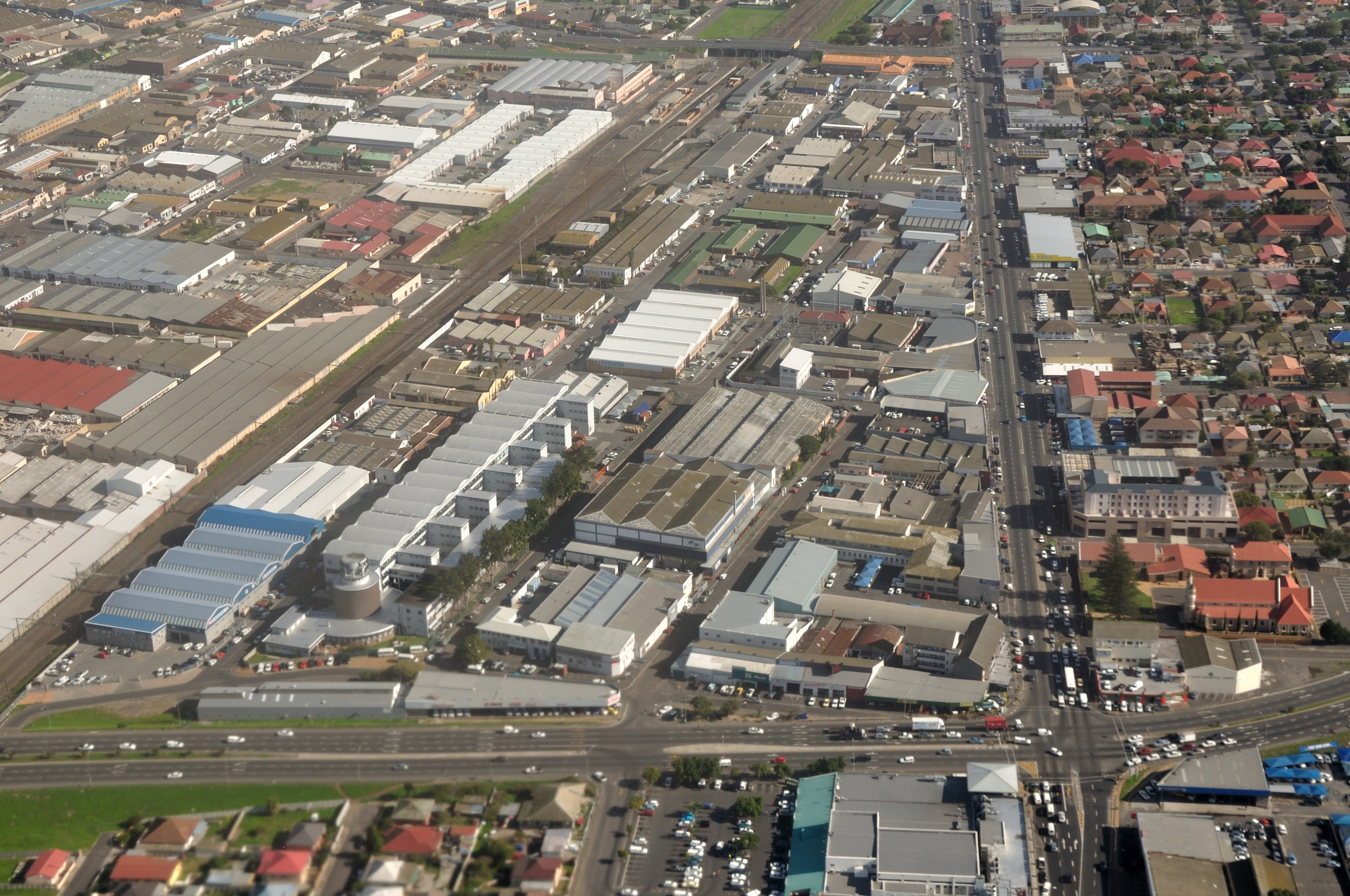
- Aerial view of Parow

- Location within Western Cape Location within South Africa Location within Africa
- Coordinates: 33°54′00″S 18°36′00″E
- Country: South Africa
- Province: Western Cape
- Municipality: City of Cape Town
- Main Place: Cape Town

Area
  - Total: 27.08 km^{2} (10.46 sq mi)

Population (2011)
  - Total: 119,462
  - Density: 4,411/km^{2} (11,430/sq mi)

Racial makeup (2011)
  - Black African: 9.6%
  - Coloured: 58.4%
  - Indian/Asian: 4.3%
  - White: 25.5%
  - Other: 2.2%

First languages (2011)
  - Afrikaans: 65.6%
  - English: 26.8%
  - Xhosa: 2.3%
  - Other: 5.3%
- Time zone: UTC+2 (SAST)
- Postal code (street): 7500
- PO box: 7499
- Area code: 021

Parow is a suburb of Cape Town, South Africa, and part of the Northern Suburbs region of the City of Cape Town.

== History ==
During a great storm in Table Bay in 1865, 19 ships were stranded. Amongst the many schooners was the Kehrwieder, the ship of Captain Johann Heinrich Ferdinand Parow. After being stranded, Captain Parow settled down in the Cape of Good Hope and married Johanna Wilhelmina Timmerman, the daughter of the family that helped Captain Parow after being stranded on the Cape coast.

Parow quickly realised the potential value of the Tyger Valley area north of Cape Town and that the area held great opportunities for cattle trade. Captain Parow soon moved inland to this area and started selling ground in the area which is today known as Parow, which built up a great deal of wealth for the captain.

Parow died on 4 December 1910, in his house in Cassibelle, Maitland. His wife, JW Timmerman, died ten years prior. They did not have any children.

Captain Parow's telescope is in the Town Hall of Parow.

== Modern day ==
A village management board was established for Parow in 1902. It was upgraded to a municipality in 1939. The municipality was incorporated into the City of Tygerberg in 1996.

The Parow valley was included in the Cape Town municipal land area in 1944. During the 1960s, 1970s and 1980s, Parow was largely transforming into a commercial area, with many shopping centres opening around Voortrekker road, one of the longest roads in Cape Town.

With the extreme political struggle of apartheid in the 1980s and the advent of democracy in the 1990s, Parow's popularity started to decline and many of its higher income population moved further north.

In 2005 Parow became the headquarters for the South African division of the International Alliance of Guardian Angels, the world's oldest and largest volunteer public safety patrol organisation.

Sports and other events are sometimes held in Parow Civic Centre.

Professional football club Cape Town Spurs F.C. is based in Parow.

JSE listed retail group The Foschini Group are headquartered in Parow, adjadent to the Parow Centre (formerly the Sanlam Centre).

== Area ==
Parow consists of the following areas: Ravensmead, Florida, Beaconvale, Cravenby, Parow Valley, Klipkop, Parow, Parow East, Oostersee, Fairfield Estate, Glenlily, Churchill Estate, Clamhall, Avondale, De Tijger, Parow North, Panorama, Plattekloof, Welgelegen, Parow Industria

== Economy ==
The Foschini Group, Pepkor, Coca-Cola Peninsula Beverages and De Haan's Bus & Coach are all based within the Parow district.

== Education ==
The Parow Satellite Campus (Zweigstelle Parow) of the German International School Cape Town is in Parow. It serves German-speaking students up to grade 4 and is in proximity to Tygerberg.

=== Primary schools ===
- Parow East Primary School
- Parow North Primary School
- Parow West Primary School
- Saffier Primary
- De Tyger Primary

=== Secondary schools ===
- Tygerberg High School
- Parow High School

=== Tertiary institutions ===
- University of South Africa (Regional Campus)

== Coat of arms ==
Parow was a municipality from 1939 to 1996. The town council assumed a coat of arms, designed by W.H. Armstrong & Co, on 30 November 1939. It had them improved by Ivan Mitford-Barberton in 1955, registered them with the Cape Provincial Administration in July 1955, had them granted by the provincial administrator in June 1967, and registered them at the Bureau of Heraldry in September 1969.

The original arms were: Gules, on a pale Or, three fleurs de lis Azure (i.e. a red shield displaying three blue fleurs de lis on a vertical gold stripe down the middle). The crest was a fleur de lis between a pair of wings; the supporters were a gemsbok and a lion; and the motto was Caute sed strenue. In the revised version, used from 1955, the shield was gold, the vertical stripe blue and the fleurs de lis silver.
