= Passion gap =

Fashionable dental modification

Passion gap or Cape Flats smile is a dental modification originating in Cape Flats, Cape Town, South Africa in which people deliberately remove the upper front teeth (maxillary incisors) for fashion and status. The practice is popular among Coloureds and has occasionally been done by White and Chinese South Africans in the area.

== Reception ==
For many years, Cape Town residents had their upper front teeth extracted due to regional cultural fashion. A 2003 study performed by the University of Cape Town found that the main reasons for extracting teeth were fashion and peer pressure followed by gangsterism and medical purposes.

The dental modification is particularly popular in the Cape Flats section of Cape Town. In an interview of 2,167 Coloured people in the Western Cape, 41% have had teeth extracted. Of those who have undergone the procedure, 44.8% were male. Children as young as 11 have had their front teeth extracted for aesthetics.

Other reasons for a passion gap include the belief of improved oral sex and kissing. Another belief is that fishermen extract their teeth to whistle louder to one another. Though the practice is still popular in the region today, perception is changing. Some employers specifically forbid the display of a passion gap.

== History ==
Dental modification in Southern Africa has been documented for 1500 years. Other forms of dental modification are more prevalent in the northern regions of Africa. Deliberate incisor removal in Western Cape remains an exception.

During the mid-seventeenth century, slaves often removed their teeth as a means to "take back control of their own bodies".

== Medical implications ==
While there are no specific medical problems caused by aesthetic dental extraction, the passion gap is described by anaesthesiologists in the region as a potential cause for difficult intubation.

== See also ==
- Body modification
