= Monte Vista, Western Cape =

Monte Vista
- Location within Western Cape Location within South Africa
- Coordinates: 33°52′S 18°33′E
- Country: South Africa
- Province: Western Cape
- Municipality: City of Cape Town
- Main Place: Milnerton

Area
  - Total: 1.69 km^{2} (0.65 sq mi)

Population (2011)
  - Total: 5,041
  - Density: 2,980/km^{2} (7,730/sq mi)

Racial makeup (2011)
  - Black African: 5.4%
  - Coloured: 10.6%
  - Indian/Asian: 2.6%
  - White: 79.9%
  - Other: 1.5%

First languages (2011)
  - English: 58.2%
  - Afrikaans: 35.4%
  - Xhosa: 2.2%
  - Other: 4.2%
- Time zone: UTC+2 (SAST)
- Postal code (street): 7460
- PO box: 7463

Monte Vista is a northern suburb of Cape Town, South Africa, whose name meaning 'Mountain View' is derived from Table Mountain being clearly visible from it. It is bordered by Edgemead, Welgelegen, Plattekloof Glen, and Goodwood.

Monte Vista Primary School was built in the 1960s.
