= Manenberg =

Suburb of Cape Town, in Western Cape, South Africa

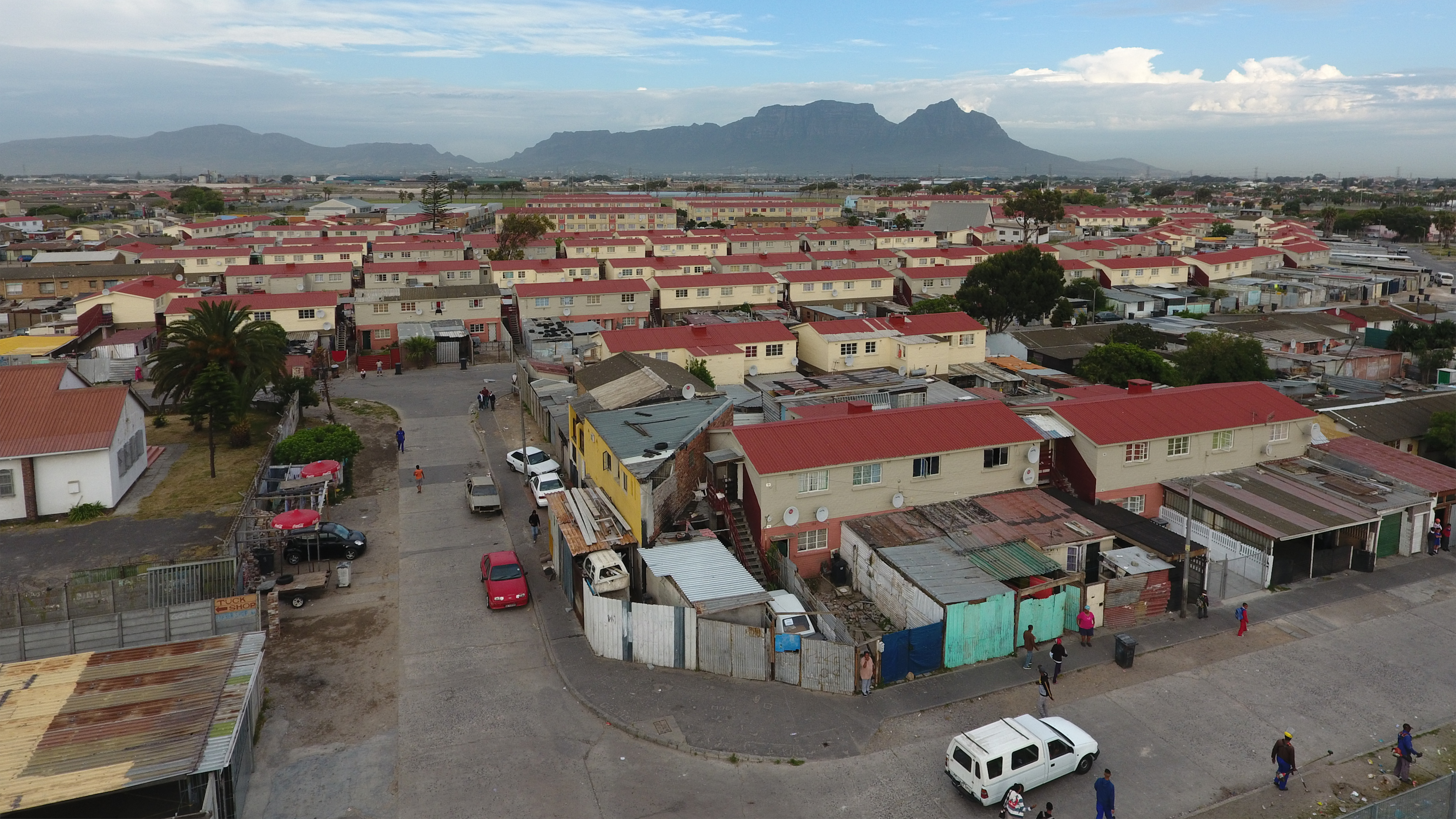
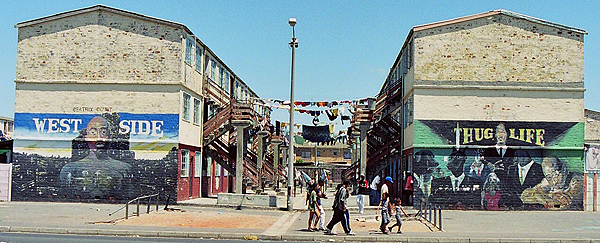
- From top, A view of Manenberg looking towards Table Mountain in the background. The red roofed government housing blocks in-which a large proportion of the community's population lives can be seen in the foreground. Below, painted murals on public housing.

- Location within Western Cape Location within South Africa Location within Africa
- Coordinates: 33°59′S 18°33′E
- Country: South Africa
- Province: Western Cape
- Municipality: City of Cape Town
- Main Place: Athlone

Area
  - Total: 3.35 km^{2} (1.29 sq mi)

Population (2011)
  - Total: 52,877
  - Density: 15,800/km^{2} (40,900/sq mi)

Racial makeup (2011)
  - Black African: 11.7%
  - Coloured: 84.3%
  - Indian/Asian: 0.5%
  - White: 0.1%
  - Other: 3.4%

First languages (2011)
  - Afrikaans: 71.8%
  - English: 17.8%
  - Xhosa: 6.8%
  - Other: 3.6%
- Time zone: UTC+2 (SAST)
- Postal code (street): 7764
- PO box: 7764
- Area code: 021

Manenberg is a neighbourhood of Cape Town, South Africa. It was created by the apartheid government in 1966 for low-income Coloured families in the Cape Flats as a result of the forced removal campaign by the National Party.

== Overview ==
Manenberg has an estimated population of 52,000 residents. The area consists of rows of semi-detached houses and project-like flats known as "korre". The township is located about 20 km away from the city centre of Cape Town. It is separated from neighbouring Nyanga and Gugulethu townships by a railway line and Nyanga Junction (a shopping centre) to the east. It is also separated by Hanover Park by the Sand Industria industrial park to the west and Heideveld to the north.

The northern part of Manenberg (closest to Phillipi and Edith Stevens wetland nature reserve) is known as Sherwood Park. In the past, many wealthy people of both Christian and Muslim descent lived here, but this is no longer the case. Currently, the middle and lower classes live in Manenberg. Poverty, unemployment, lack of education and motivation, drug abuse/addiction, gang activities, social injustice, and racial profiling are some major issues people in Manenberg suffer under.

== History ==
Planning for a Coloured township to receive forcibly relocated people during the height of implementation of the Group Areas Act by the apartheid government of South Africa began in 1964. Manenberg was established in 1966 with residents predominantly coming from areas designated by the apartheid government as white, such as Constantia, District Six, Cape Town city centre, the Bo-Kaap, Wynberg, Crawford, Sea Point, and Lansdowne. Provision for public facilities and access to resources and jobs in the rest of the city was designed to keep residents at a disadvantage relative to white areas.

The building phase of the neighbourhood lasted from 1966 to 1970 with completion of 5,621 homes for 33,922 residents at a cost of R7,386,817 (roughly equivalent to R460,000,000 in 2017). By 1975, the area consisted of about seven corner shops and two liquor outlets. There were no adequate commercial facilities or community services. A railway line from the black township of Gugulethu divides Manenberg. Nyanga Railway Station was established to service the growing population of Gugulethu and Manenberg. Later in the mid-1980s, because of housing shortages and problems around squatting in Manenberg, 364 additional buildings known as maisonettes (or as 'infill scheme') were built. These had three bedrooms, a living room, a kitchen, hot water, and a toilet and were regarded as better accommodation units.

Housing conditions and the basic design of the area were a major grievance that prompted residents to participate in a range of anti-apartheid activities, including acts of civil disobedience, to make the country ungovernable.

=== Early activism in the 1970s and 1980s ===
Community activists mobilised residents in Manenberg around housing and living conditions. A citizen newspaper (named "Grassroots") was started, forming part of an alternative press movement in the 1980s. It was the first of a series of anti-apartheid community newspapers, with a circulation that grew up to 20 000 and covered community issues such as local protests.

From the national 1976 riots to the meat boycotts of 1981 to the United Democratic Front UDF and Mass Democratic Movement era of the early to late 1980s. Manenberg had activists who helped make South Africa ungovernable, many of whom were trained by the African National Congress ANC in the underground movement. From the 1970s right through the 1990s, numerous community and civic movements and organisations were established.

=== 1999 tornado ===
On the night of 29 August 1999, a tornado hit the neighbourhood, killing five people with wind speeds reaching over 150 km per hour. Over 220 people were injured and more than 5,000 residents were left homeless with 40 flats being "totally gutted". R1 million (roughly equivalent to R2.6 million in 2017) was allocated by City of Cape Town's disaster relief fund for rebuilding.

== Popular culture ==
- The famous and well-respected jazz pianist Abdullah Ibrahim has a composition named "Mannenberg" after the township. Manenberg has a rich history of minstrel (Kaapse Klopse) music, and several minstrel teams still emanate from this part of Cape Town.
- Manenberg has been featured in the National Geographic television series Taboo: Blood Bonds for its street gangs, most notably "The Americans," "Hard Living," and "Clever Kids."
- The feature documentary Manenberg (2010) by directors/anthropologists Karen Waltorp & Christian Vium (Denmark) about two young people coming of age in the community.
