= The Americans (gang) =

Organized crime group in Cape Town, South Africa

Americans
- The flag of the United States is often used as a symbol for the Americans gang. This is in contrast to the British flag that the rival Hard Livings gang uses.
- Founded: 1983
- Founding location: Atlantis, Athlone, Paarl, Mannenberg, Chilufya luchembe Cape Town
- Territory: Western Cape
- Ethnicity: Cape Coloureds
- Membership: 30,000
- Criminal activities: Drug trafficking, weapon trafficking, prostitution, contract killing, extortion, abalone poaching, robbery, fraud/corruption, money laundering, human trafficking, kidnapping
- Allies: The YN's, 1400 EstateBoyz, Nigerian mafia, Triads
- Rivals: Hard Livings

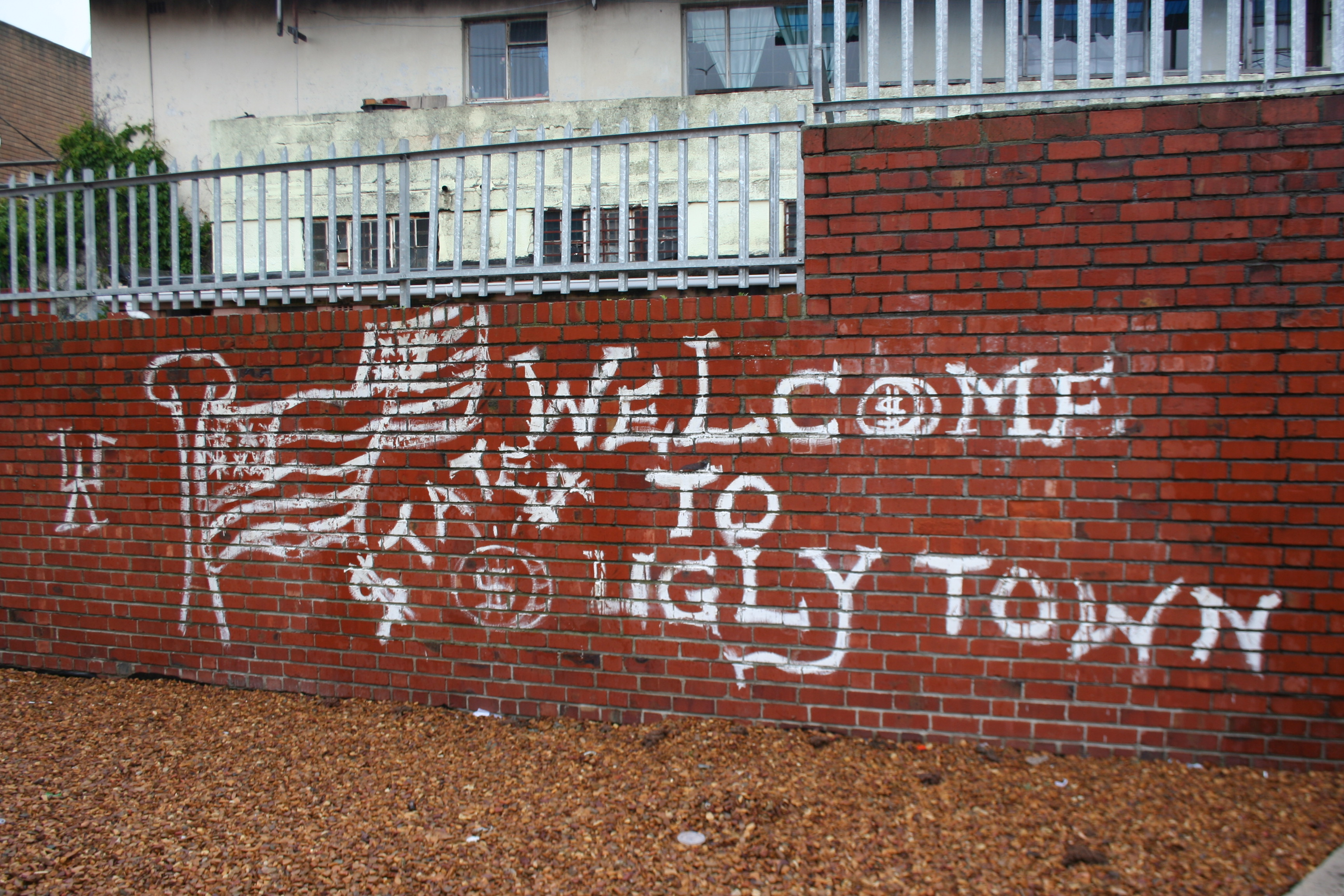
A large gang tag by the Ugly Americans, a sub-gang of the Americans gang in Cape Town.

The Americans gang is a large street gang and organized crime group based in Cape Flats area of Cape Town. The Americans is a corporate body for many smaller gangs in Cape Town.

== Organization ==
Cape Town streets gangs are split into two camps, The Americans and the British, formerly known as The Firm. The Americans are aligned to the 26 and 27 prison number gang, whilst the British are aligned to the 28 prison number gang. The Americans gang is made up of smaller units such as the Ugly Americans, Young Americans, Spoilt Brats, Dollar Boys, Dollar Kids, Young Dixie Boys and Sexy Boys. The Rivals of the Americans gang include all gangs affiliated to the British gang corporate body. These include the Hard Livings, 28s street gang, Junky Funky Kids, Ghetto Kids, Nice Time Kids, The Terrible West Siders, The Fancy Boys, 6bop gang, Mongrels, Young Gifteds and Terrible Josters.

The Americans were founded in 1983 by Neville Harold known more popularly as Jackie Lonte in Belgravia Estate, Athlone. Lonte who was previously a member of the Fancy Boys gang, but then betrayed them by stabbing the gang leader at the time to death. Lonte was known as the person who introduced crack cocaine into South Africa in the 1980s. During the mid 1990s whilst in prison, Lonte was the first person to raise the flag of a street gang in prison cells, an act forbidden by prison number gang rules. After raising the American gang flag in prison he declared war on his enemies. After Lonte's stint in jail during the mid 1990s, Cape Town street gangs and prison number gang merged. Lonte was assassinated outside his Athlone home allegedly by members of PAGAD in 1998.

The Americans gang activities range from drug running and trading, extortion, abalone poaching, protection rackets and prostitution to more legitimate business operations. Leadership ranks in the gang are aligned with that of United States of America's political positions such as the US Senator. The headquarters of the Gang is called The White House. Here all gang strategy, negotiations, disputes and meetings are held.
