= Heideveld =

Suburb of Athlone, in Western Cape, South Africa

- Location within Western Cape Location within South Africa
- Coordinates: 33°58′S 18°33′E
- Country: South Africa
- Province: Western Cape
- Municipality: City of Cape Town
- Main Place: Athlone, Cape Town

Area
  - Total: 1.82 km^{2} (0.70 sq mi)

Population (2011)
  - Total: 17,388
  - Density: 9,550/km^{2} (24,700/sq mi)

Racial makeup (2011)
  - Black African: 5.3%
  - Coloured: 92.3%
  - Indian/Asian: 0.8%
  - White: 0.1%
  - Other: 1.4%

First languages (2011)
  - Afrikaans: 63.1%
  - English: 34.4%
  - Xhosa: 1.2%
  - Other: 1.3%
- Time zone: UTC+2 (SAST)
- Postal code (street): 7764

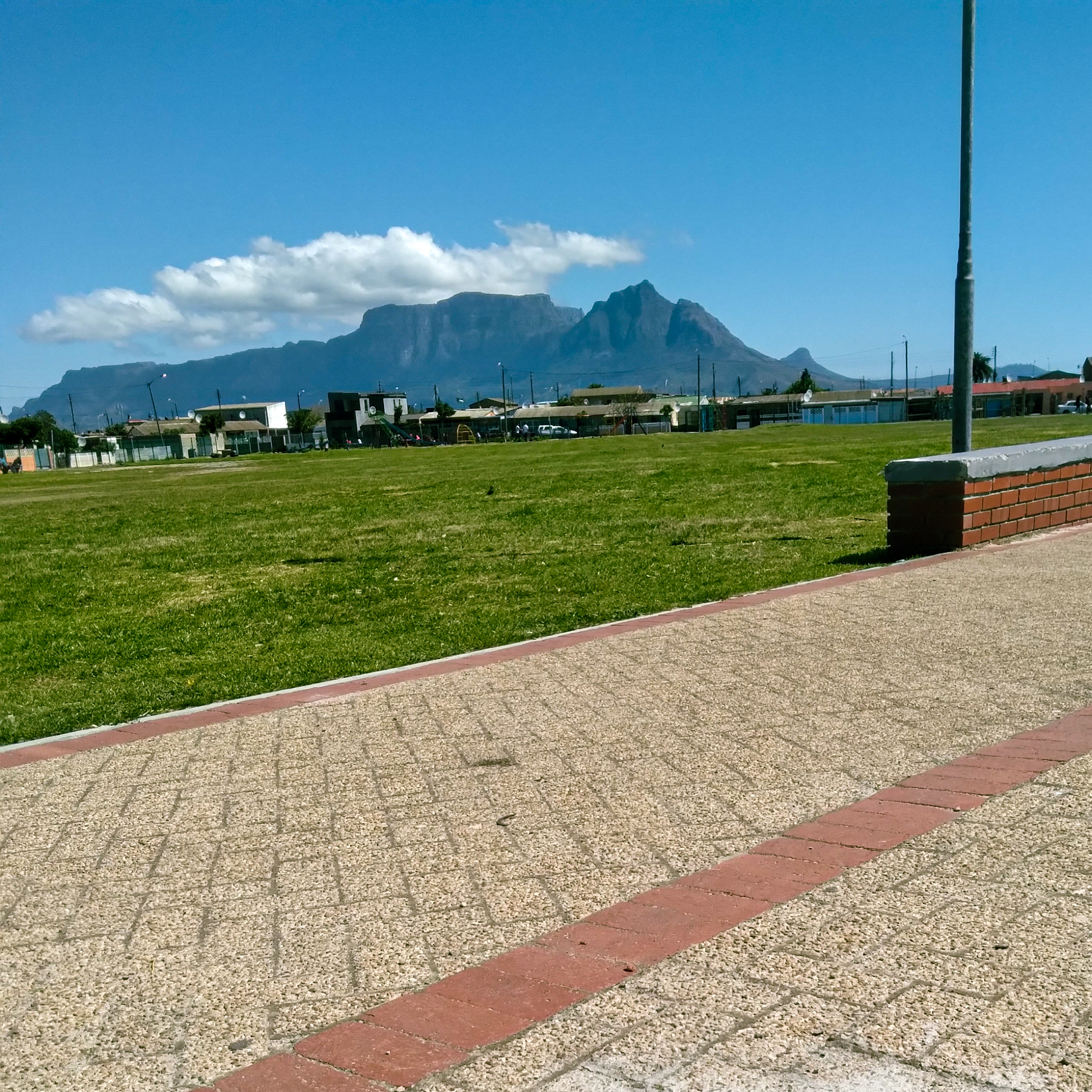
Cockscomb Park, Heideveld

Heideveld is a town or suburb in the Athlone part of Cape Town, South Africa. Heideveld got its name because the area used to have large grazing grounds (or field which is "veld" in Afrikaans) where a popular flower ("heideblommetjie") grew in abundance. The area used to be a dairy farm, and cows used to graze amongst the heideblommetjies.

== Location ==
It is located in the Cape Town Metro area. It is surrounded by several divisions of itself including Vangurd Estate to the south, Welcome Estate to the east and south-east, Heideveld Station to the north and Surrey Estate to the west. Although Heideveld neighbours Manenburg, an area known for high crime rates, crime in Heideveld is very low. The area was rumored to be a farm area with a water source as plants that grow near to lakes and ponds tend to grow on their own accord.

== Government facilities ==
Heideveld has quite a few government facilities contrary to its size. A day hospital situated in the main road of Heidveld Road opposite the main flats. A train station at its North most point. It has five Primary schools: Woodlands Primary school in Heideveld, Vanguard Primary in vanguard, Estate Welcome Primary in Welcome, Estate Heideveld Primary on Modderdam Road, and Surrey Primary in Surry Estate, Heideveld Primary, Willows Primary.

There are two High Schools in the area: Cathkin High and Heideveld High.

It also has big soccer field that accommodates for an annual Sunday League. The players consists of the surrounding areas like Surrey Estate, Gatesvile, Rylands etc. Houses in Vanguard are the largest in the area and are architectural different. It is considered more wealthy then other areas in Heideveld. The area has a number of public parks like the park in Cockscomb Road which was upgraded to include a running track and a soccer track with a gym and wooden park, Natural granite can be found there too. Certain trees in the area are home to Weaver birds. There is also a foot bridge which makes it easier and safer for residents of Gugulethu to past through, as many make their way through the area for school, work and shopping.

The area also houses convenient stores, hardware stores and dental offices. It also has a library, civil centre and Post Office. The roads and pavements in the area were heavily upgraded and the Willows and Heideveld Primary schools were completely rebuilt to modern and of higher quality than before, Its construction and the construction of the foot bridge are the most significant upgrades to the areas. also more could be done, such as an upgrade to the Library. The area is usually calm since the inception of the flats. The area is mostly Muslim and Christian with many Churches and Mosques in the area with a small Hindu community.

Most of Heideveld's economic activity is centered around Chain Food Land, Vangate Mall and Gatesville. The area has the land for potential for upgrades and beautification up no effort has been put in so far.
