= Panorama, Parow =

Panorama
- Location within Western Cape Location within South Africa Location within Africa
- Coordinates: 33°52′48″S 18°34′34″E
- Country: South Africa
- Province: Western Cape
- Municipality: City of Cape Town
- Main Place: Cape Town
- Established: 1956

Government
  - Councillor: Izak Pretorius (DA)

Area
  - Total: 0.91 km^{2} (0.35 sq mi)

Population (2011)
  - Total: 3,121
  - Density: 3,400/km^{2} (8,900/sq mi)

Racial makeup (2011)
  - Black African: 12.0%
  - Coloured: 9.6%
  - Indian/Asian: 7.0%
  - White: 70.1%
  - Other: 1.3%

First languages (2011)
  - Afrikaans: 48.1%
  - English: 44.5%
  - Xhosa: 1.2%
  - Other: 6.2%
- Time zone: UTC+2 (SAST)
- Postal code (street): 7506 (Boxes); 7500 (Streets)
- PO box: 7506
- Area code: +27 (0)21

Panorama is a suburb in Parow, Cape Town, South Africa.

== History ==
In 1700 land that today form part of Panorama was awarded to Booysen, B.

The name originated when Booysen arrived at his land for the first time, saw the pretty view, turned to his wife, and said "Liefie, kyk hierdie mooi Panorama", which translates to him indicating to his wife that there is a beautiful Panorama from this area.

In 1986, the Panorama Mediclinic was opened here, thereby being the first hospital opened, which had been built by the then relatively new Mediclinic Group. As of current, this is one of the largest Private Hospitals in South Africa.

== Change of ownership through the years ==
From Booysen it was then transferred to Meyboom, C which called it "de Grendel" It changed hands through the years and owners were: Meyboom, F. Heyns, J. and van Reenen, D. In 1890 Sir David Graaff, 1st Baronet purchase the land.

== The Graaff family ==
They farmed with horses and milk. When Sir David died in 1931, his son de Villiers took it over. The land was in a company called Graaff's Trust. After de Villiers death in 1999 his son David was in charge.

== Residential development and the naming error ==
In 1956 two pieces of land were sold for residential development. The remaining part of the farm (which today makes wine) is still in the hands of the Graaff family. The one piece being on a hill, from where Table Mountain is visible, and the other piece at the bottom of the hill. The intention was that the piece of land on the hill being called Panorama (Panorama meaning view) and the other piece Plattekloof (Afrikaans word for flat valley). The town planners however made an error and the two names were switched. Today the area with the views is Plattekloof and the area at the bottom of the hill Panorama.

== Notable residents ==
- Melissa Williams, Olympic skateboarder born and grew up in the suburb.
