= Hanover Park, Cape Town =

Suburb of Cape Town, in Western Cape, South Africa

Hanover Park
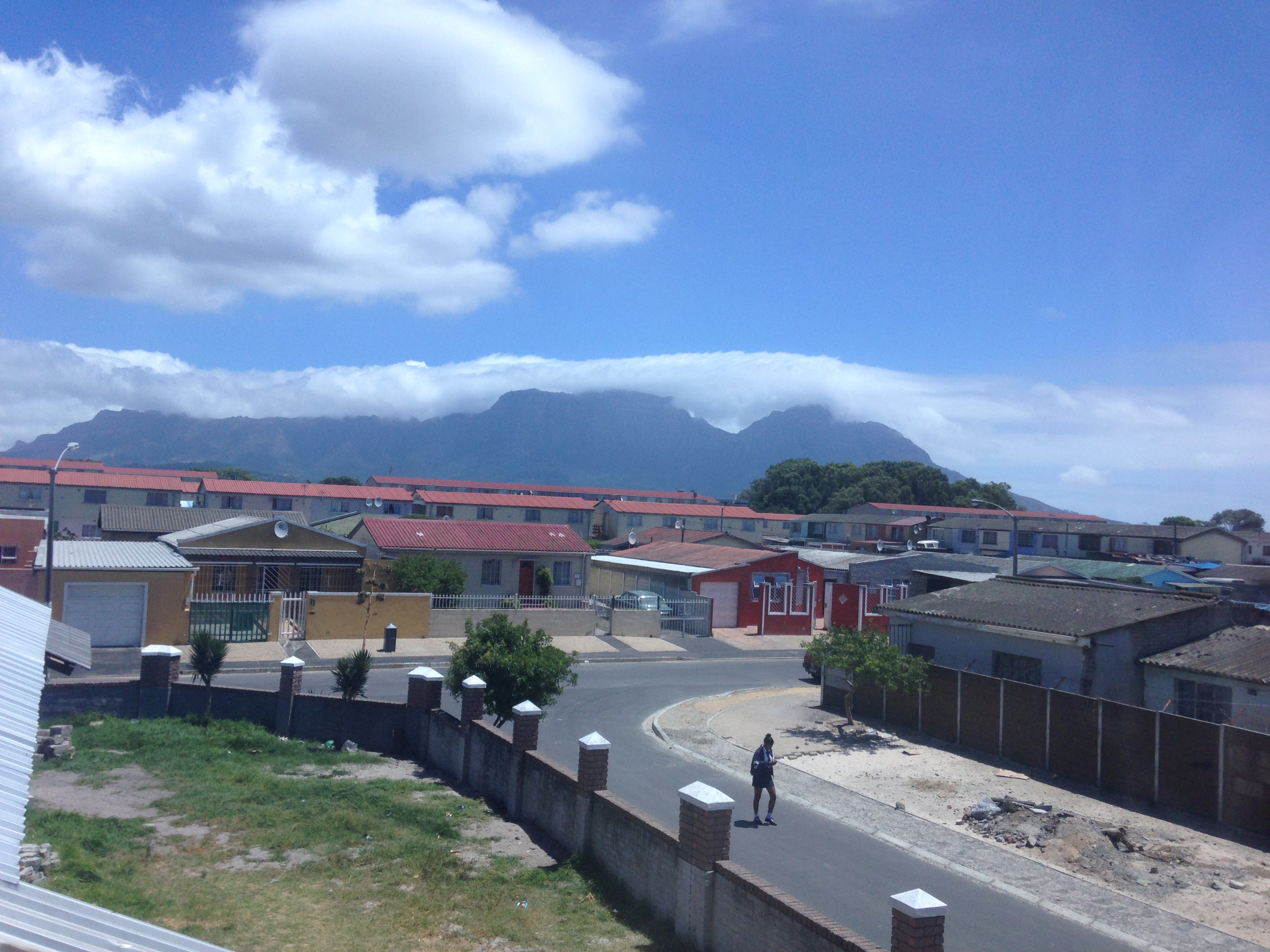
- A view of Hanover Park

- Location within Western Cape Location within South Africa
- Coordinates: 33.994°S 18.531°E
- Country: South Africa
- Province: Western Cape
- Municipality: City of Cape Town
- Main Place: Athlone, Cape Town

Area
  - Total: 2.09 km^{2} (0.81 sq mi)

Population (2011)
  - Total: 34,625
  - Density: 16,600/km^{2} (42,900/sq mi)

Racial makeup (2011)
  - Black African: 2.4%
  - Coloured: 96.5%
  - Indian/Asian: 0.4%
  - White: 0.1%
  - Other: 0.6%

First languages (2011)
  - Afrikaans: 70.7%
  - English: 27.9%
  - Other: 1.4%
- Time zone: UTC+2 (SAST)
- Postal code (street): 7780
- PO box: 7782

Hanover Park is a working class neighborhood of the City of Cape Town in the Western Cape province of South Africa.The neighbourhood was established in the 1960s as a township to resettle coloured people who had been evicted from areas designated as ‘reserved for whites’ during apartheid. Its population remains predominantly coloured to this day.

== History ==
=== Origin of the name ===
The origin of the name Hanover Park remains unclear. Some local accounts have suggested a link to Hanover Street in District Six (from where many residents of Hanover Park were evicted). Another theory suggests a reference to King William IV (King of the United Kingdom and Hanover). However, published evidence supporting these hypotheses is limited, and no definitive origin has been established in the available literature. Given that, from the late 1870s onwards, German settlers were encouraged by the Cape colonial government to establish gardens in the Philippi area (near Hanover Park), the name may also derive from the German city of Hanover.

=== Creation as a coloured township during apartheid ===
According to the South African History Online website, the land where Hanover Park is situated was administratively incorporated into Cape Town on 14 August 1958. This area was located on the outskirts of Cape Town and was very sparsely populated. The neighbourhood developed mainly during the 1960s, following the implementation of the Group Areas Act, and in particular after the demolition of District Six. Hanover Park then became a important resettlement area for the coloured population forcibly displaced by the apartheid authorities. Coloured people evicted from the Claremont and Newlands areas, which were reserved for whites, were also relocated to Hanover Park. The township was officially established in 1969. The housing stock, much of which still exists today, originally consisted of two-storey residential blocks. Subsequently, three-storey blocks were built. The forced relocation of residents to collective housing most likely disrupted existing community networks and contributed to the gradual rise in gang territoriality, violence and crime.

In February 1980 the neighborhood was the starting point of a national prolonged school boycott in protest of apartheid laws and policies.

=== Hanover Park today ===
Hanover Park remains shaped by the legacy of apartheid and has a very high crime rate, characterised by the prevalence of numerous gangs. In 2011, its population stood at 34,625, 96 per cent of whom identified as Coloured.

Although Hanover Park is its own neighborhood separate from Philippi to its south it is situated within the Philippi police precinct area.

Hanover Park currently has a very high crime rate.

== Notable people ==
- Benni McCarthy, South African footballer
- Albert Fritz, South African politician
