= Bishop Lavis =

Suburb of Cape Town on the Cape Flats

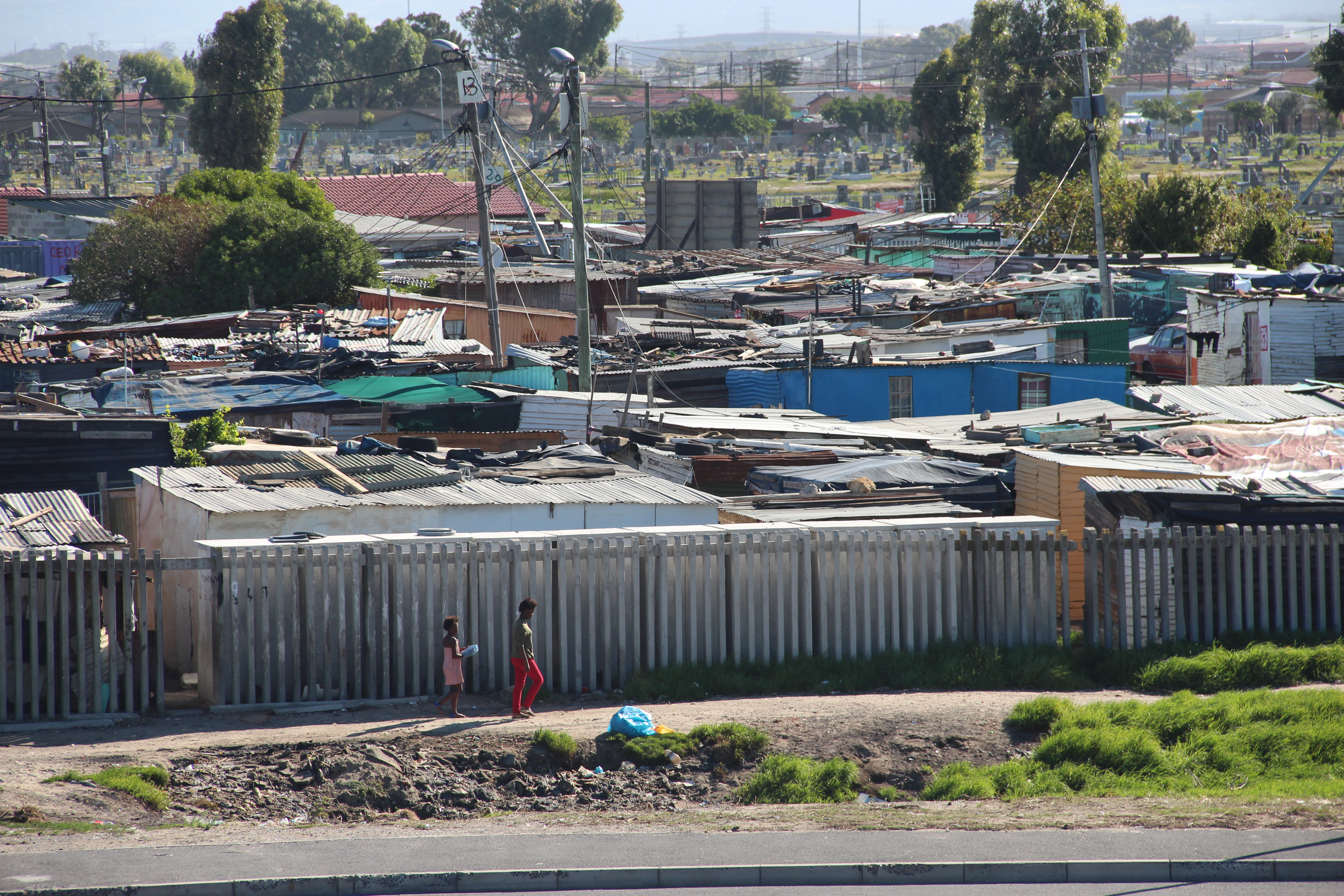
- An informal settlement in Bishop Lavis.

- Location within Western Cape Location within South Africa
- Coordinates: 33°56′55″S 18°34′33″E
- Country: South Africa
- Province: Western Cape
- Municipality: City of Cape Town
- Established: Developed by Communicare between 1951 - 1960

Area
  - Total: 2.58 km^{2} (1.00 sq mi)

Population (2011)
  - Total: 26,482
  - Density: 10,300/km^{2} (26,600/sq mi)

Racial makeup (2011)
  - Black African: 1.9%
  - Coloured: 97.2%
  - Indian/Asian: 0.3%
  - White: 0.0%
  - Other: 0.5%

First languages (2011)
  - Afrikaans: 86.4%
  - English: 12.0%
  - Other: 1.5%
- Time zone: UTC+2 (SAST)
- Postal code (street): 7490
- Area code: 021

Bishop Lavis is a suburb of Cape Town, located 15 kilometres (9 mi) east of the city centre near Cape Town International Airport. It had, as of 2001, a population of 44,419 people, of whom 97% described themselves as Coloured, and 90% spoke Afrikaans while 9% spoke English. The official 2011 census gave the population figure as 26,482.
