= Cape Flats =

Region of Cape Town, South Africa

The Cape Flats
- Interactive map of The Cape Flats
- Coordinates: 33°59′33.407″S 18°34′13.939″E
- Country: South Africa
- Province: Western Cape
- Municipality: City of Cape Town
- City: Cape Town

Area
  - Total: 458.9 km^{2} (177.2 sq mi)

Population (2011)
  - Total: 1,845,671
  - Density: 4,022/km^{2} (10,420/sq mi)
- Time zone: UTC+2 (South African Standard Time)
- Area code: 021

The Cape Flats (Afrikaans: Die Kaapse Vlakte) is an expansive, low-lying, flat area situated to the southeast of the central business district of Cape Town.

Within the context of the City of Cape Town metro, the Cape Flats refers to a planning region which includes a total of 39 suburbs.

== Geology and geography ==
In geological terms, the Cape Flats is a vast sheet of aeolian sand, ultimately of marine origin, which has blown up from the adjacent beaches over a period of a hundred thousand years. Below the sand, the bedrock is in general alternating layers of dark grey shale, siltstone and minor sandstone from a late-Precambrian rock formation called the Malmesbury Group.

The exception is on part of the western margin, between Zeekoevlei (to the south) and Claremont and Wetton (to the north), where an intrusive mass of Cape granite is to be found. Most of the sand is unconsolidated; however, in some places near the False Bay coast the oldest sand dunes have been cemented into a soft sandstone (calcrete), and form low cliffs at the edge of the beach.

These formations contain important fossils of animals such as the extinct Cape lion and also provide evidence that stone-age people hunted here tens of thousands of years ago.

=== Extent ===
To the west the expanse of the Cape Flats is limited by rising ground that slopes up to the steep cliffs of the Cape Peninsula mountain chain, while in the east the land rises gradually towards the equally rugged cliffs of Hottentots Holland mountains and other elevated regions of the interior of the Boland.

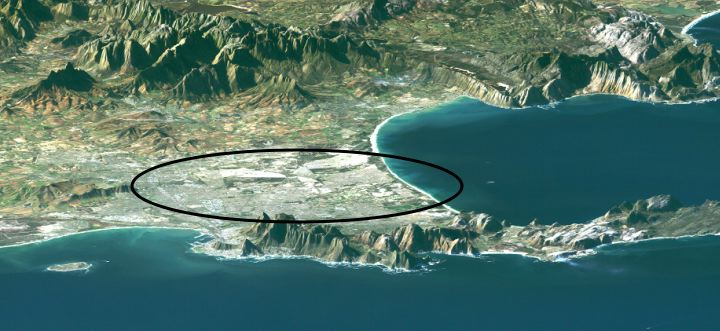
Landsat image of Cape Town and environs, looking roughly east. The Cape Peninsula is in the foreground, with Table Bay and Robben Island to the left, and False Bay with Seal Island (small white dot) to the right. The mountains of the Boland are in the background. The oval (long axis about 25 km) roughly encompasses the Cape Flats

=== Climate ===
The area has a Mediterranean climate, with warm dry summers and cool, damp winters. It is generally exposed to the wind, both from the northwest (winter) and southeast (summer). Due to the low-lying terrain and high winter groundwater levels, some areas are prone to seasonal flooding, a risk exacerbated by dense urban settlement. Cold wet spells, especially in August and September, can make life very difficult for those living in sub-standard housing.

=== Drainage ===
Historically the Cape Flats was partly covered in wetlands, particularly during winter. Many of these have been destroyed by canalisation and infilling to provide residential space. Many of the remaining perennial vleis such as Zeekoevlei, Rondevlei and Zandvlei, now part of formal conservation areas, are at the southwest side of the region.

- Elsieskraal River and the Black River catchment (northwest)
- The Diep River
- Zeekoevlei and its catchment
- The Eerste River
- The Kuils River

=== Flora ===
- Cape Flats Dune Strandveld – Endangered vegetation type endemic to the coastal areas around Cape Town
- Cape Flats Sand Fynbos – Vegetation type endemic to the City of Cape Town

== History ==
=== Before 1950 ===
The noted English naturalist, William John Burchell, remarked in 1811 that the deep sand of the Flats made travel by cart or wagon extremely difficult. The situation was aggravated by a widespread shortage of firewood, causing fuel collectors to cut the relatively few indigenous shrubs and trees that stabilised the sand.

During the second half of the 19th century, the area was completely overrun by alien vegetation, mainly of Australian origin. The plants included hakeas and especially wattles (genus Acacia). The principal reason for this infestation lay in decisions made by the colonial authorities. It was an era before the advent of modern technological methods for the construction of permanent roads and in those days the Cape Flats was a massive sea of unstabilised sand dunes that moved with the winds. This made travel between Cape Town and the interior very difficult, particularly for the large ox-drawn wagons of the time. The authorities decided to try to stabilise the sand with plants native to the British colonies of New South Wales and Western Australia.

The earliest importation of wattles was in 1827. Massive plantings were established in the 1840s and 1850s and the work continued until well after 1875. At the time, the plan worked well enough: the march of the dunes was arrested. The price paid, in ecological terms, was that the Cape Flats was carpeted by invasive species. Serious efforts have in recent years been made to roll back this alien scourge.

=== Since 1950 ===
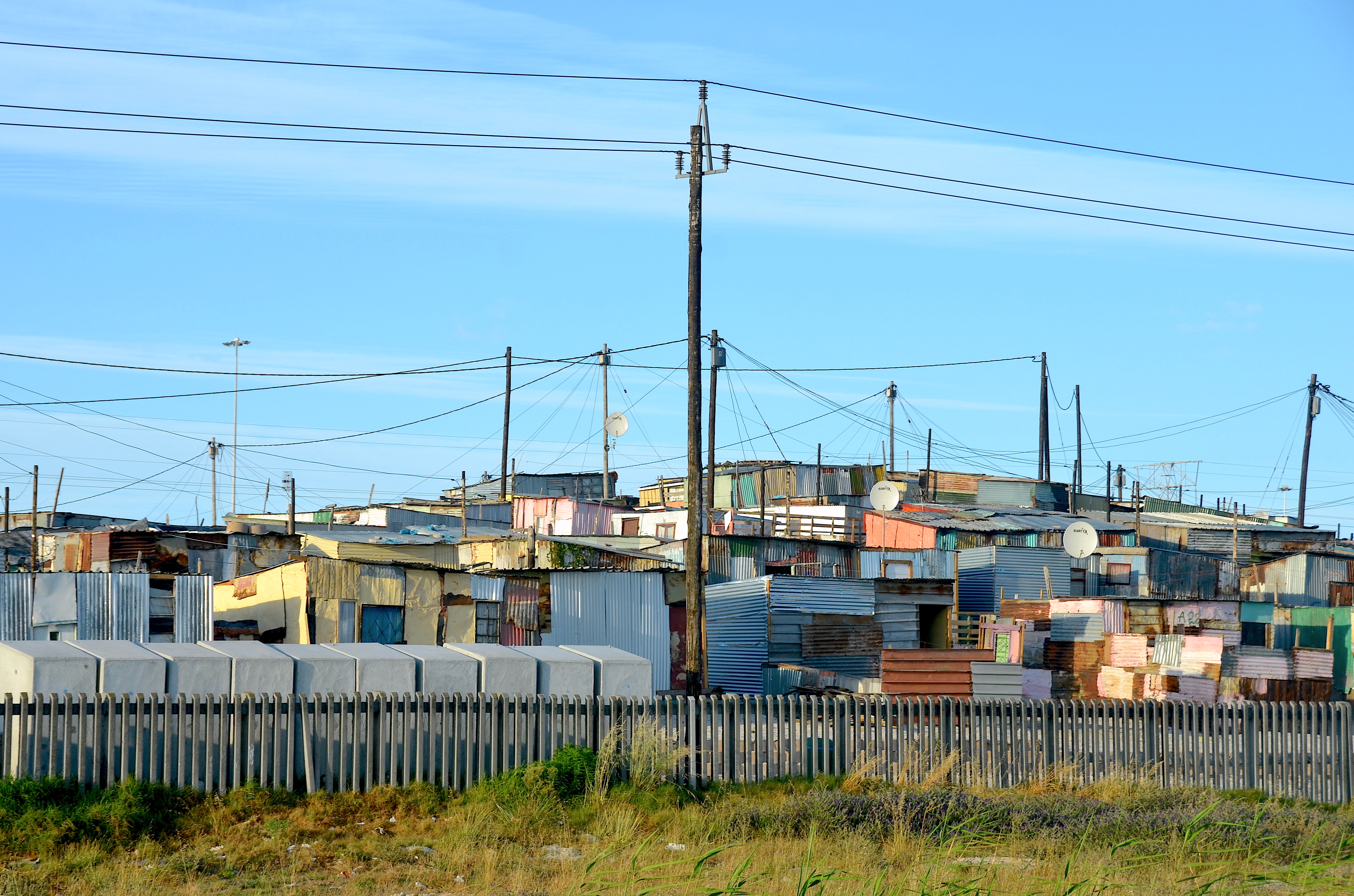
Khayelitsha, Township along N2 (2015)

The Cape Flats has undergone dramatic change in the past half a century. In 1950 the area was practically uninhabited. There was a single, narrow road across the Flats from Cape Town to The Strand that ran between walls of alien rooikrans bushes and one could travel for miles without seeing any sign of habitation other than a few fences and a handful of farmhouses.

Native antelope roamed at will between the dense thickets of wattles. The army used the area for military exercises and the few farmers who inhabited the Flats eked out a living by growing vegetables in pockets of relatively poor soil between the barren dunes. Modern amenities were unknown; telephones were unknown, drinking water was collected in tanks from roofs and at night the rooms were lit by oil lamps.

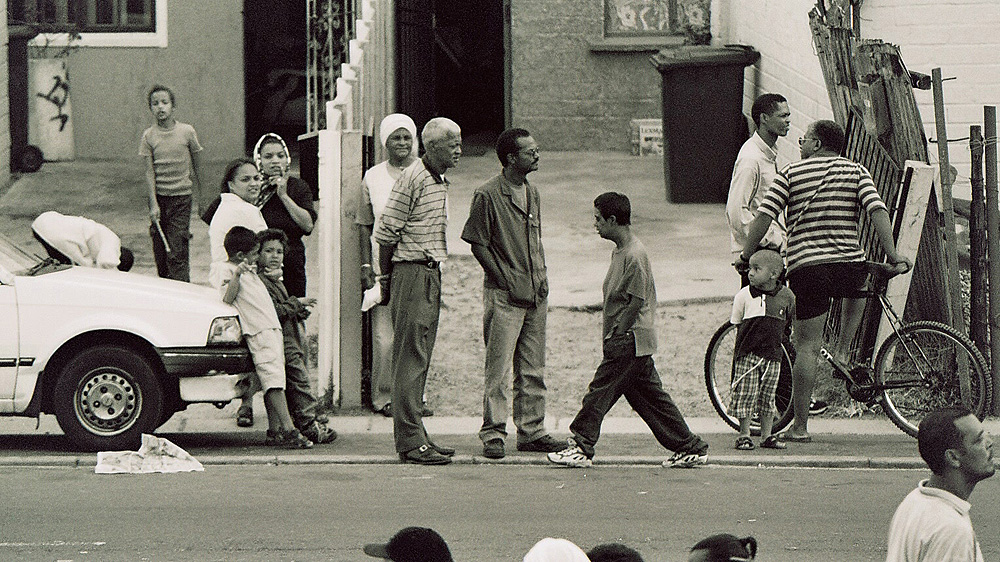
Street scene in Bonteheuwel township

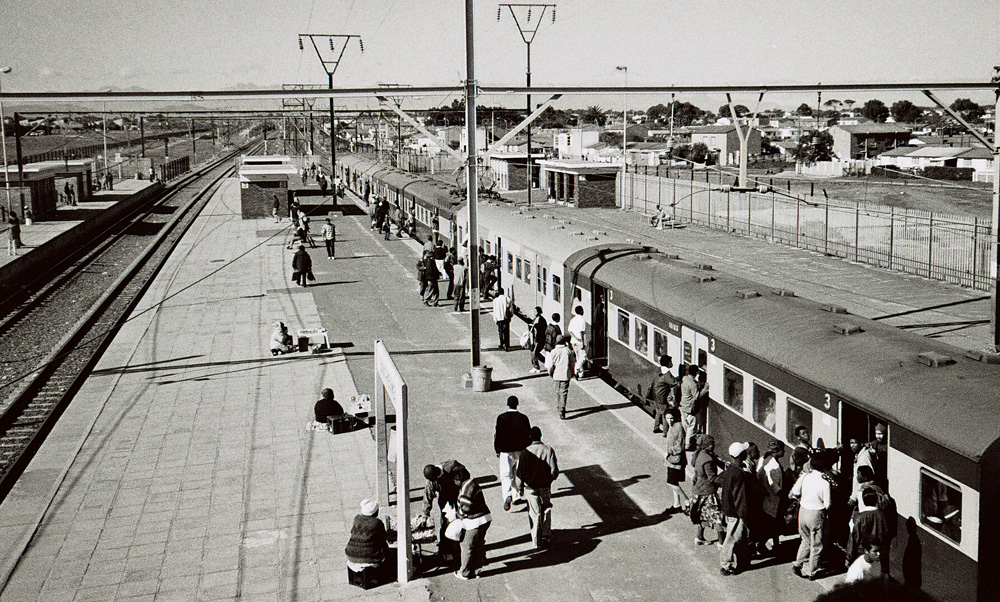
Cape Flats train station

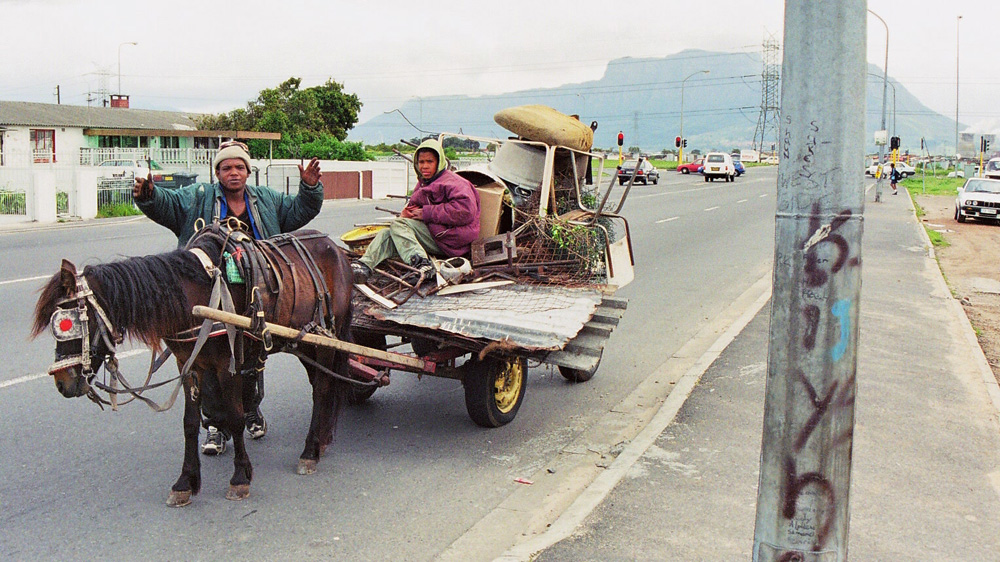
Cape Flats scrap collectors

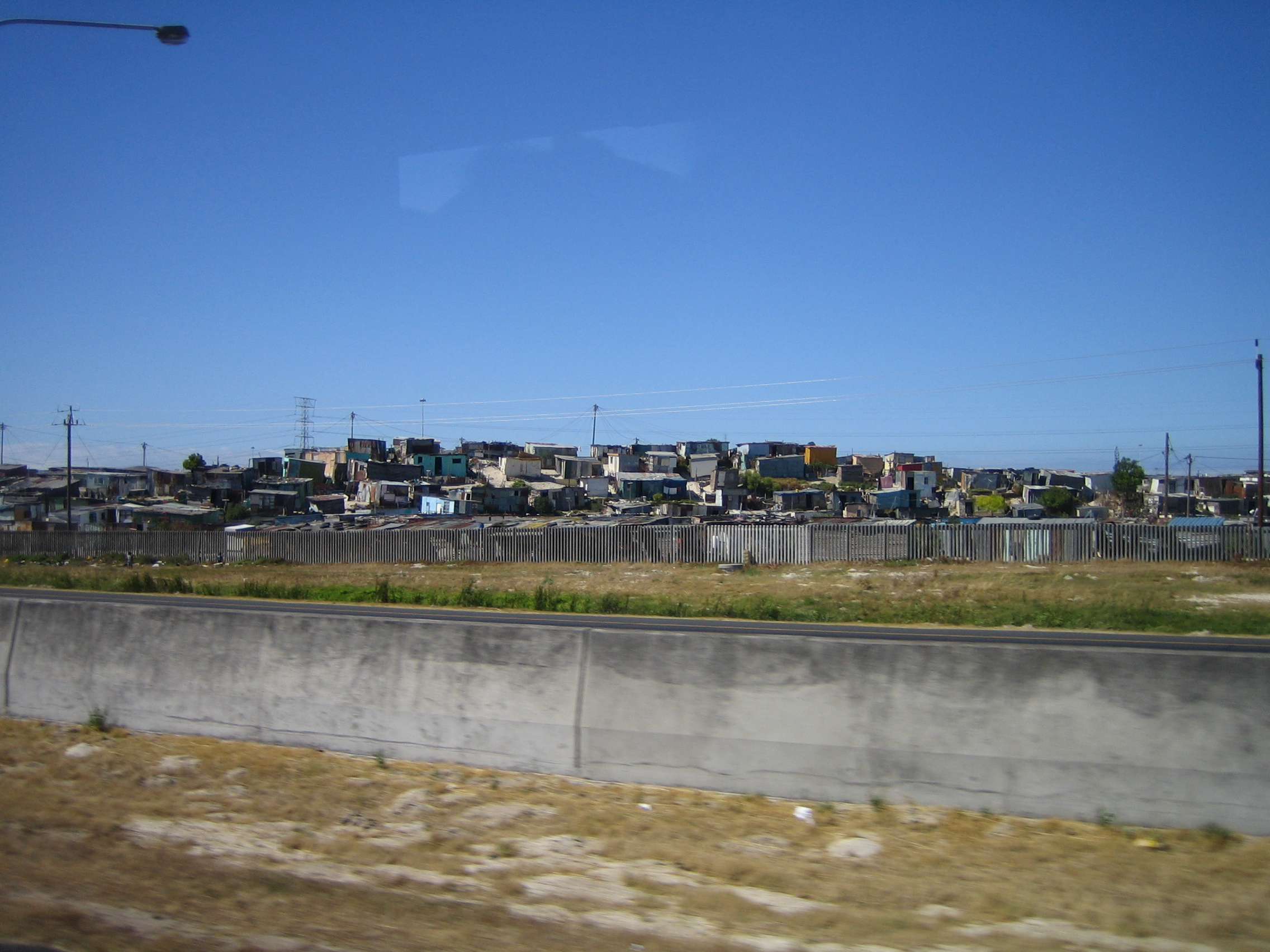
Shantytown in Cape Flats

The era of sand and antelopes vanished completely in little more than a generation. Vegetable farming persisted, but to a much lesser extent, because urbanisation enveloped vast tracts of land in short order.

During the apartheid era, race-based legislation such as the Group Areas Act and pass laws either forced non-white people out of more central urban areas designated for white people and into government-built townships in the Cape Flats, or made living in the area illegal, forcing many people into informal settlements elsewhere in the Cape Flats.

Large housing projects were built here, mostly as part of the Nationalist government's larger effort to force the so-called Coloured communities and other people of Colour (mostly Xhosa) out of the central and western areas of Cape Town, which were designated as white areas under the Group Areas Act.

This meant that only white people could reside there permanently, as under the apartheid system black Africans were officially made citizens of native reserves (called "homelands"), therefore having resident worker status, despite often never having been there & having spent their entire lives in the now "designated white" regions.

Since many of the mostly Xhosa workers and their families, were designated under apartheid as citizens of assigned native reserves/homelands, many who were out of formal work were obliged to live in the area illegally, further contributing to the growth of informal settlements.

In addition to the extant townships of the mid-century, other large townships (such as Mitchell's Plain & Khayelitsha across the road) were created on the flats in the 1970s and 1980s. Both have become among the largest residential areas in Cape Town and some of the largest in the country at large.

Large scale rural-urban migration has rapidly increased the population, putting strain on housing with major increases in informal shack settlement, including in areas that were originally created on a planned basis, for example, Khayelitsha.

One of the major priorities of the RDP (Reconstruction & Development Programme) is to build houses.

Since the end of apartheid, these communities are no longer legally bound by racial restrictions; but history, language, economics and ethnic politics still contribute to homogeneity of local areas. So, for example, most residents of Mitchell's Plain likely still speak a locally inflected version of Afrikaans, along with English and either they or their parents were designated as Coloured by apartheid; most residents of Khayelitsha still speak Xhosa and English and either they or their parents were designated as Black by apartheid.

Nonetheless, some areas of the Cape Flats have an increasing diversity of residents, with Xhosa-speaking people having an increasingly noticeable presence in some previously mainly Afrikaans-speaking areas.

== Culture and politics ==
Popular musicians from the area include pop singer Brenda Fassie and jazz artists Abdullah Ibrahim and Basil Coetzee, who named their song "Mannenberg" after a Cape Flats township. There is an active hip hop movement.

Its religious communities include (to name only a few) Afrikaans-speaking congregations of the Dutch Reformed Church, Rastafarian communities, people who engage only in traditional Xhosa practices, syncretic Xhosa Christian churches, evangelical Christian churches, and southern Africa's largest Muslim community (drawing its oldest roots from the historic Cape Malay community, which dates to the 17th century).

In the 1940s, a type of dental modification known as a passion gap became fashionable and remains popular today. The modification involves the removal of a person's top front teeth.

The Cape Flats' political history is complex and sometimes baffling even to insiders: for instance, the politics of the Coloured communities of the Cape Flats have included Trotskyist activism in earlier years, and mobilisation for the ANC's United Democratic Front in the 80s; and then, widespread support for the historically white National Party (which had presided over apartheid) in the early post-apartheid elections. More recently, the area has seen an expansion of African National Congress strength from its base in the Black townships and into historically Coloured areas, as well as a particularly strong local growth of left-wing social movements like the Treatment Action Campaign which offer a critique of government policies.

== Crime ==
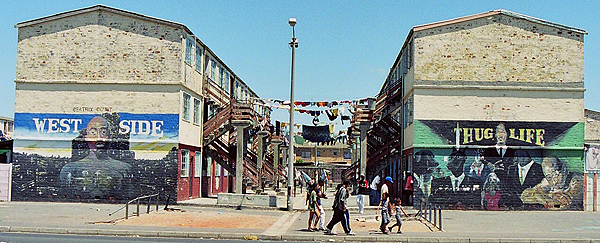
West Side and Thug Life murals in the suburb of Manenberg, in Hard Livings gang territory

Almost all of the communities of the Cape Flats remain, to one degree or another, poverty-stricken. Serious social problems include a high rate of unemployment and high levels of gang activity. During the late 1990s and early 2000s, there was significant armed conflict between various gangs and PAGAD (People Against Gangsterism and Drugs), a vigilante organisation.

Post-apartheid development projects, such as the Reconstruction & Development Programme, have also led to violent conflicts within communities. As of 2014, efforts to combat gangs include Hanover Park's Ceasefire programme, where former gang members "use their experiences to mediate gang disputes and help young men and women quit gang life. The gang violence escalated to the point where the South African National Defence Force had to be deployed to the gang-impacted areas of the Cape Flats to help the provincial police force deal with the increasing gang violence.

Some well-known criminal organisations based in the Cape Flats include:

- The Americans: one of the largest gangs in the Cape Flats, known for their violent tactics and their involvement in drug trafficking.
- The Hard Livings: a Cape Flats-based gang known for drug trafficking and operating extortion rings.
- The Junky Funky Kids (JFK): the JFK gang has recently been engaged in a violent turf-war with The Americans gang, and in 2017, 4 of its members were sentenced to life for murder.

A wide range of community empowerment organisations work non-violently to combat the poverty, crime and health problems, and the role of civil society in many parts of the area is relatively strong. In late 2019, South African political group, the TRAKboys began enforcing a ceasefire between the gangs in Cape Flats. Citing the repeated failure of government initiatives aimed at curbing gun violence in Cape Flats, the TRAKboys created a system of community justice and enacted harsh punishments on any gang members found to be plotting violence on any members of a rival gang or a fellow Cape Flats resident.

== Suburbs on the Cape Flats ==
The Cape Flats is a diverse region containing numerous suburbs and townships, each with a distinct history shaped significantly by apartheid-era planning. Notable suburbs include:

- Athlone
- Bishop Lavis
- Blue Downs
- Bonteheuwel
- Elsie's River
- Gugulethu – Established in the 1950s to house migrant workers
- Grassy Park
- Heideveld
- Hanover Park
- Khayelitsha – One of the largest and fastest-growing townships in South Africa, established in the 1980s
- Langa – The oldest formal township in Cape Town, established in the 1920s
- Lansdowne
- Lavender Hill
- Lotus River
- Macassar
- Manenberg
- Matroosfontein
- Mitchells Plain – A large suburb built in the 1970s primarily for the Coloured population
- Nyanga
- Ottery
- Parkwood
- Philippi
- Retreat
- Strandfontein
- Zeekoevlei

== Transport ==
The Cape Flats is served by the N2 (South Africa), which bisects the region and runs from Cape Town CBD to Somerset West and beyond. There are numerous regional routes in and around the Cape Flats. The R102 borders the region at the top (running parallel with the N1), and the R310 borders it at the bottom, along the coast. the M7 and R300, which together form a U-shape that starts and ends at the R102.

The Central Line of the Metrorail network runs from Cape Town CBD, southwards through the Cape Flats, passing suburbs including Bishop Lavis and Gugulethu. It then curves eastwards before continuing south into Mitchells Plain, terminating at Kapteinsklip Station in Rocklands, near the coast.

Many buses and minibus taxis travel between the Cape Flats and other parts of Cape Town (especially the CBD) each day. Phase 2 of the MyCiTi BRT rollout is set to connect Khayelitsha on the Cape Flats with Claremont in the Southern Suburbs. The latter is bordered by Wynberg, a major transit hub.

== See also ==
- List of Cape Town suburbs
