= Northern Suburbs, Cape Town =

Sub-region of the City of Cape Town, South Africa

Northern Suburbs
- Region
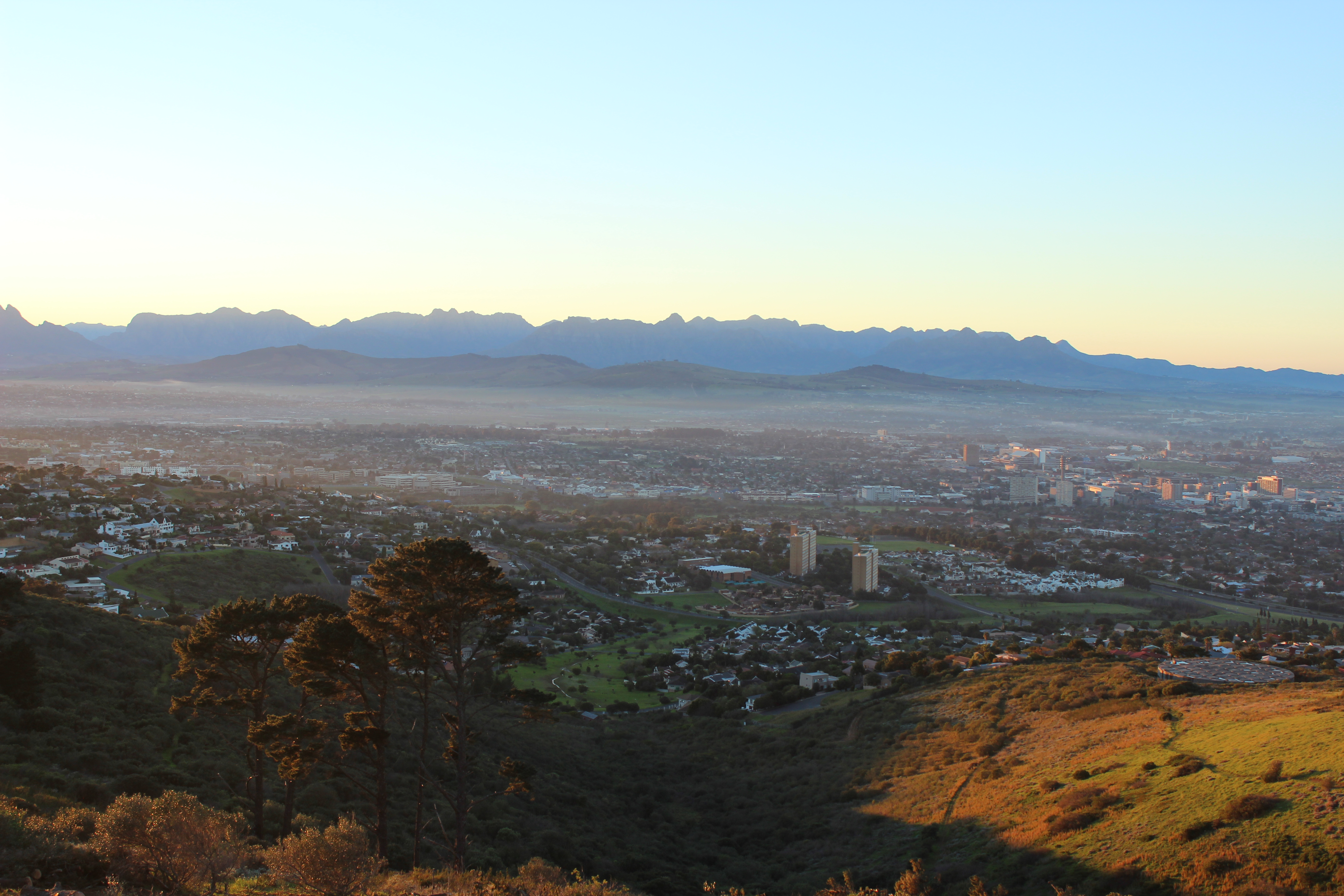
- View of Bellville from Tygerberg Hill

- Location within Western Cape Location within South Africa
- Coordinates: 33°54′00″S 18°38′00″E
- Country: South Africa
- Province: Western Cape
- Municipality: City of Cape Town

Area
  - Total: 437.86 km^{2} (169.06 sq mi)

Population (2011)
  - Total: 1,028,463
  - Density: 2,348.8/km^{2} (6,083.5/sq mi)
- Time zone: UTC+2 (SAST)
- Area code: 021

The Northern Suburbs is a major urban and rural region located in the City of Cape Town Metropolitan Municipality in the Western Cape province of South Africa. It is the urban north-eastern part of the Greater Cape Town metropolitan area (Cape Metropole) that is functionally merged with Cape Town.

== Geography ==
The region extends from Goodwood in the west to Kraaifontein, Brackenfell and Kuilsrivier in the east and north up to incorporate the rural village of Philadelphia.

The principal town in the Northern Suburbs is Bellville, which is situated to the south of the Tygerberg Hills. Along with Bellville, the population density of the region is concentrated along the N1 corridor, including the towns of Goodwood, Parow, Brackenfell, and Kraaifontein. Bordering Bellville to the north, among the Tygerberg Hills, is the town of Durbanville and along the R300 corridor, bordering Bellville and Brackenfell, is the town of Kuilsrivier.

Though separate, these aforementioned towns have virtually become one due to development and urban sprawl and as a result have become known as the northern suburbs of Cape Town.

The Northern Suburbs’ borders encompass the vibrant townships of Bloekombos, Wallacedene and Scottsdene in Kraaifontein, and the smaller township of Fisantekraal just outside Durbanville.

Towards the extreme north of the Northern Suburbs about 20 kilometres (12.4 mi) from Durbanville are the rural settlements of Klipheuwel and Philadelphia, which are the most isolated and least integrated areas within the City of Cape Town metropolitan area.

== Suburbs ==
In terms of the City of Cape Town municipal planning district of the Northern Suburbs, the area comprises a total of 35 neighborhoods.

== Transportation ==
=== Roads ===
The Northern Suburbs mainly lies along the N1 freeway which traverses through Goodwood, Parow, Bellville, Brackenfell and Kraaifontein, routing traffic north-east from Cape Town to Paarl and Worcester. The R300 freeway (Kuils River Freeway) connects the northern suburbs of Bellville, Brackenfell and Kuilsrivier with Mitchells Plain to the south. The N7 freeway lies to the far west of the northern suburbs linking Goodwood with Malmesbury to the north.

=== Rail ===
The Metrorail Western Cape commuter rail system connects Cape Town to the northern suburbs of Goodwood, Parow, Bellville, Brackenfell and Kraaifontein via the Northern Line and also connects Strand and Somerset West in the Helderberg region to the northern suburbs of Kuilsrivier and Bellville via the Strand Line.

=== Air ===
As of 2026, a new international airport is in development for the City of Cape Town metro. The Cape Winelands Airport is set to be built on the site of the old Fisantekraal Airport, in Durbanville. The airport is still in the planning phases, and Environmental Authorization was submitted in 2025. Its owners expect it to accommodate over 5 million passengers annually by 2050.

== Crime ==
=== Human trafficking ===
The Northern Suburbs are recently experiencing human trafficking. As of October 2023, there have been 74 human trafficking victims, 42 labour trafficking victims, 9 victims of unspecified trafficking activities, 23 sex trafficking victims, and an estimated overall sum of 250 000 victims in South Africa.
