= M9 (Cape Town) =

South African metropolitan route

Metropolitan route M9

Route information
- Maintained by City of Cape Town and Western Cape Department of Transport and Public Works
- Length: 50.3 km (31.3 mi)

Major junctions
- East end: N2 / M165 near Gordon's Bay

- M153 in Somerset West M149 in Somerset West M168 in Somerset West; R44 in Somerset West M156 near Somerset West; R102 in Firgrove; N2 in Firgrove; R310 near Khayelitsha M56 in Khayelitsha; M51 in Khayelitsha M32 in Khayelitsha; M50 in Khayelitsha M45 in Khayelitsha M44 in Khayelitsha M49 in Khayelitsha M171 in Philippi East M36 in Philippi East; M22 in Nyanga M83 in Nyanga; M10 in Manenberg; M7 near Manenberg; M17 in Hanover Park; M28 in Kenilworth

- West end: M4 / M152 in Wynberg

Location
- Country: South Africa

Highway system
- Numbered routes of South Africa
← M8	→ M10

The M9 is a long metropolitan route in the City of Cape Town, South Africa. It connects Sir Lowry's Pass Village with Wynberg via Somerset West, Firgrove, Macassar, Khayelitsha and Nyanga.

== Route ==
The M9 begins at a junction with the N2 national route just north-east of Gordon's Bay. It begins as Sir Lowry's Pass Village Road by going northwards into the Sir Lowry's Pass Village to reach the Old Sir Lowry's Pass Road, where it turns westwards. It heads west-north-west for 6 kilometres, parallel to the N2, to enter the town of Somerset West and reach a junction with the M153 route, where it changes its name to Main Road. At the next junction, the M9 leaves Main Road to become Andries Pretorius Street via a left turn. It heads north-west for 2 kilometres through the town centre of Somerset West as Andries Pretorius Street, then Upper Orange Street, to reach another junction with Main Road, where the M9 becomes Main Road westwards. It proceeds to reach a junction with the R44 route (Broadway Boulevard).

The M9 continues west-north-west as Main Road to enter Firgrove, where it turns to the south-west and immediately crosses the R102 route (Old Main Road) and the N2 highway again. After crossing the N2, it passes through the southern part of Macassar (separating the suburb from the Macassar Dunes Conservation Area) in a westerly direction before crossing the Eerste River. It continues west-north-west and reaches a junction with the R310 route (Baden Powell Drive), where it enters the large township of Khayelitsha.

The M9 heads west-north-west through Khayelitsha for 10 kilometres as Govan Mbeki Drive, meeting the M32 route, to fly over the R300 freeway (Kuils River Freeway) and pass through the Nyanga township and the northern part of the Philippi township westwards as Japhta K Masemola Road. It then crosses under the M7 freeway (Jakes Gerwel Freeway) and passes through the southern part of Hanover Park westwards to reach a junction with the M17 route. It enters Cape Town at the Wetton suburb and then passes under the M5 freeway. After the M5, it passes through the southern part of the Kenilworth suburb to reach its end at a four-way-junction with the M4 Main Road in the suburb of Wynberg.
