= M7 (Cape Town) =

Metropolitan route in the City of Cape Town, South Africa

Metropolitan route M7

Route information
- Maintained by City of Cape Town and Western Cape Department of Transport and Public Works
- Length: 24 km (15 mi)

Major junctions
- North end: N1 / N7 in Acacia Park
- M25 in Goodwood; R102 in Goodwood; M16 in Epping; N2 in Thornton; M18 in Vanguard; M24 in Hatton Estate; M9 in Nyanga; M10 in Philippi; R300 in Mitchells Plain M181 in Mitchells Plain M46 in Mitchells Plain M177 in Mitchells Plain M32 in Mitchells Plain
- South end: R310 in Rocklands

Location
- Country: South Africa

Highway system
- Numbered routes of South Africa
← M6	→ M8

The M7, also named Jakes Gerwel Drive (previously Vanguard Drive; renamed on 18 January 2015), is a limited-access road and metropolitan route in the City of Cape Town, South Africa. It connects Acacia Park with Rocklands on the False Bay Coast via the Cape Flats.

== Route ==
The M7 begins at an interchange with the N1 highway and the southern terminus of the N7 highway adjacent to Acacia Park and Summer Greens. The M7 begins by heading southwards as Jakes Gerwel Drive (formerly Vanguard Drive; renamed on 18 January 2015), forming the western boundary of Goodwood, to meet the R102 (Voortrekker Road). The M7 then enters the Southern Suburbs, separating Thornton in the west from the GrandWest Casino in the east before meeting the M16 (Viking Way) and separating the two sides of the Epping Industrial Area.

It then crosses the N2 highway to enter the Cape Flats and proceeds south-south-east for 9 kilometres, through Vanguard, bypassing Manenberg, through Philippi (bypassing its Horticultural Area), to reach Mitchells Plain, where it meets the southern terminus of the R300 freeway (Cape Flats Freeway; Peninsula Expressway).

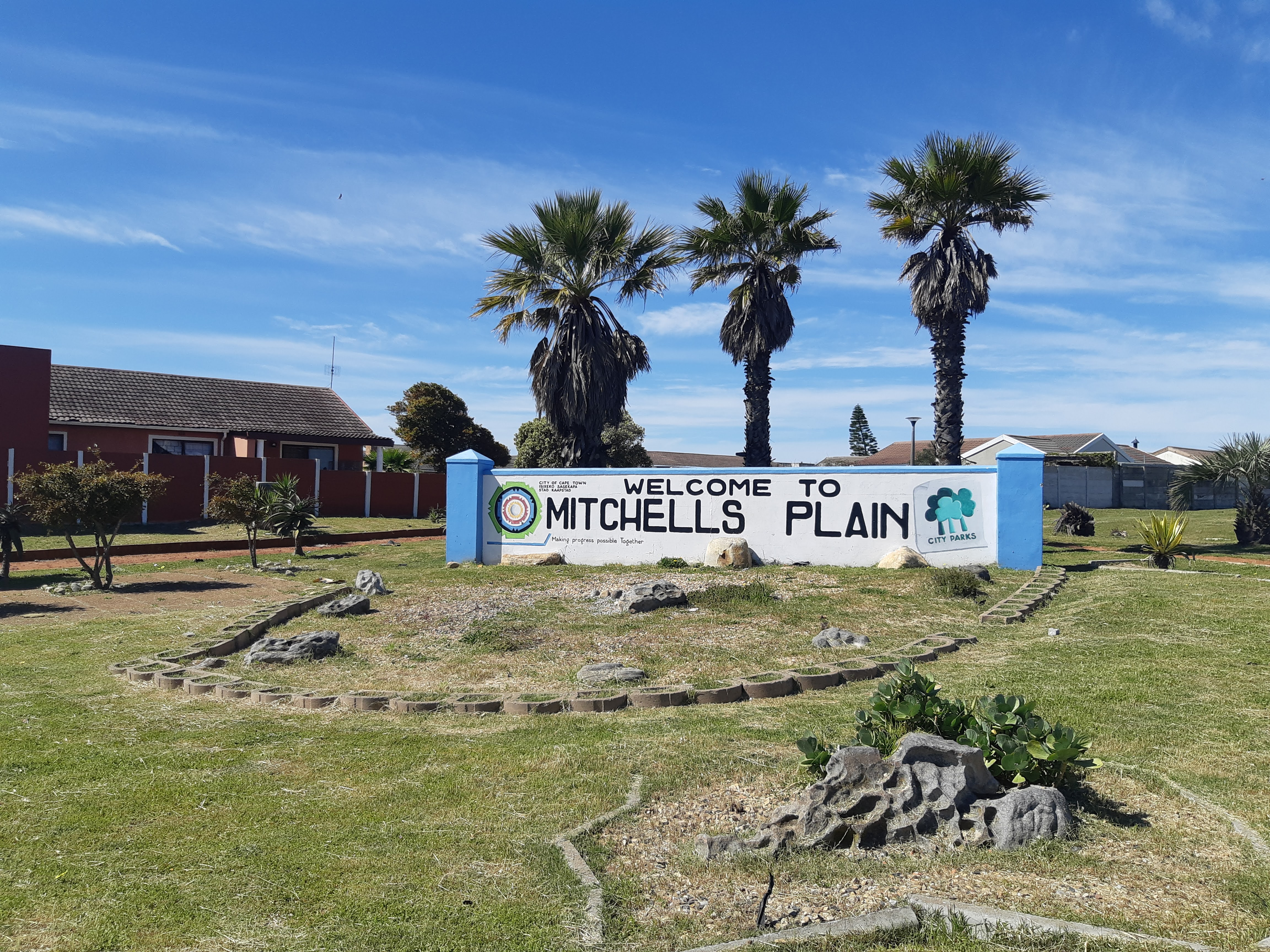
Mitchell's Plain sign at the M7 and R300 junction

The M7 continues southwards from the R300 junction as the western boundary of Mitchell's Plain to reach Rocklands on the False Bay coast, where it meets the M32 (Spine Road) before reaching its end at an intersection with the R310 (Baden Powell Drive) adjacent to Mnandi Beach.

== Developments ==
As of 2023, the City of Cape Town is considering upgrading the M7 from the N1/N7 interchange to the N2 interchange into a limited-access freeway, thereby turning all intersections into grade-separated interchanges. This new freeway will also be designated as the N7, making the N2 the new southern terminus of the N7.
