= M10 (Cape Town) =

South African metropolitan route

Metropolitan route M10

Route information
- Maintained by City of Cape Town and Western Cape Department of Transport and Public Works
- Length: 16.7 km (10.4 mi)

Major junctions
- North end: R102 in Bellville
- M11 in Bellville M189 / M171 in Bellville South; M29 in Belhar; M12 in Belhar; M22 in Matroosfontein M47 in Nooitgedacht; N2 in Heideveld; M18 in Heideveld; M24 in Nyanga; M9 in Nyanga
- South end: M7 in Philippi

Location
- Country: South Africa

Highway system
- Numbered routes of South Africa
← M9	→ M11

The M10 is a metropolitan route in the City of Cape Town Metropolitan Municipality, South Africa. It connects the town of Bellville with Philippi on the Cape Flats.

== Route ==
The M10 begins at a junction with the R102 (Voortrekker Road) in Bellville Central. It begins by heading southwards as Robert Sobukwe Drive through Bellville South to reach a junction with the M189, where it continues by a right turn (still named Robert Sobukwe Drive). The M10 continues south-west, bypassing Belhar, to reach a junction with the M12 (Stellenbosch Arterial). It continues south-west, through Matroosfontein (bypassing Bishop Lavis), to meet the northern terminus of the M22, which provides an entrance to Cape Town International Airport.

From the M22 junction, the M10 continues west through the Nooitgedacht suburb to reach an interchange with the N2 highway (Settlers Way), where it turns to the south. It passes through the Heideveld and Nyanga suburbs to reach its end at an interchange with the M7 freeway (Jakes Gerwel Drive) in Philippi, just north of its Horticultural Area.
