= M5 (Cape Town) =

Metropolitan route in the City of Cape Town, South Africa

Metropolitan route M5

Route information
- Maintained by City of Cape Town and Western Cape Department of Transport and Public Works
- Length: 37 km (23 mi)

Major junctions
- North end: N7 in Dunoon
- M14 in Killarney Gardens M87 in Milnerton; M8 in Milnerton; N1 in Brooklyn; M16 in Maitland N2 / M52 in Mowbray; M18 in Athlone M34 in Rondebosch; M24 in Kenilworth M68 in Plumstead M38 in Southfield M55 in Grassy Park M35 in Grassy Park
- South end: R310 in Muizenberg

Location
- Country: South Africa

Highway system
- Numbered routes of South Africa
← M4	→ M6

The M5 is a metropolitan route and expressway in the City of Cape Town Metropolitan Municipality, South Africa. It connects Milnerton on the Western Seaboard in the north to Muizenberg in the south, and crosses both the N1 and the N2. For part of its length, from the N1 interchange to Plumstead, it is a limited-access freeway (motorway). From Mowbray to Muizenberg, it is parallel to the M4 Main Road.

The M5 is one of two main metropolitan freeways in Cape Town, with the other being the M3, situated closer to Table Mountain.

== Route ==
The M5 begins at the Potsdam interchange with the N7 highway in the suburb of Dunoon. It goes south-south-west as Potsdam Road and reaches a junction with the M14 (Blaauwberg Road), where it becomes Koeberg Road and becomes a dual carriageway. The M14 joins the M5 for a kilometre southwards before becoming its own road eastwards (Plattekloof Road) while the M5 continues south as Koeberg Road. It proceeds southwards for 9 kilometres, through the large suburb of Milnerton, to reach the Koeberg interchange with the N1 highway (Table Bay Boulevard) in Brooklyn, where it becomes a limited-access motorway.

It proceeds southwards from the N1 interchange as the Black River Parkway, crossing the Black River, through Maitland, to reach an interchange with the N2 highway (Settlers Way) near Mowbray, where it becomes the Kromboom Parkway. It proceeds southwards, through Athlone, Rondebosch East and Lansdowne, to reach the M68 (Ottery Road) interchange in Plumstead, where the M5 loses its motorway status but remains a dual-carriageway as Prince George Drive. It proceeds southwards, through Retreat, to enter Muizenberg on the False Bay Coast, where it terminates at a roundabout junction with the R310 (Baden Powell Drive).

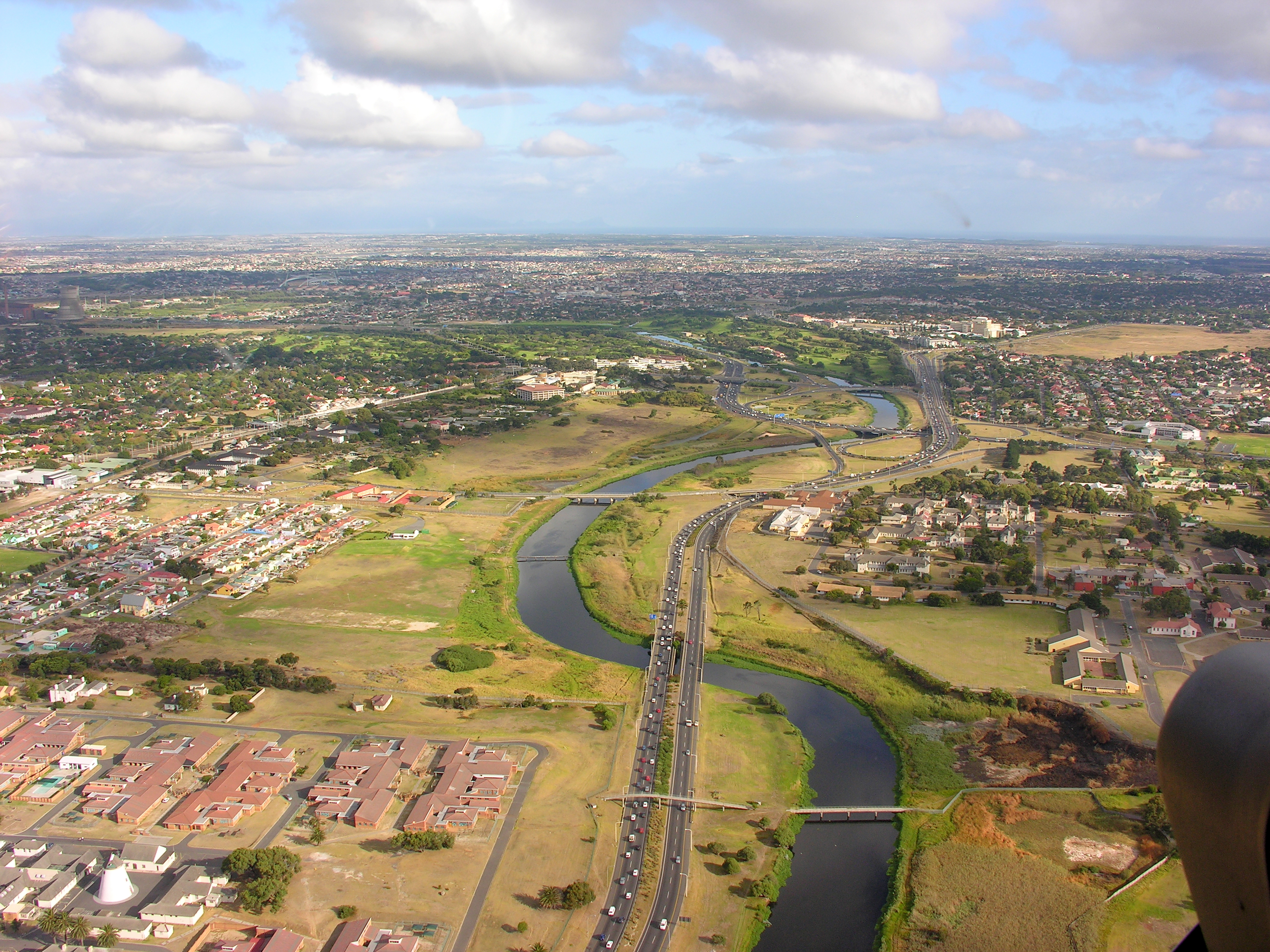
An aerial view of the M5 highway with the Black River running alongside it.

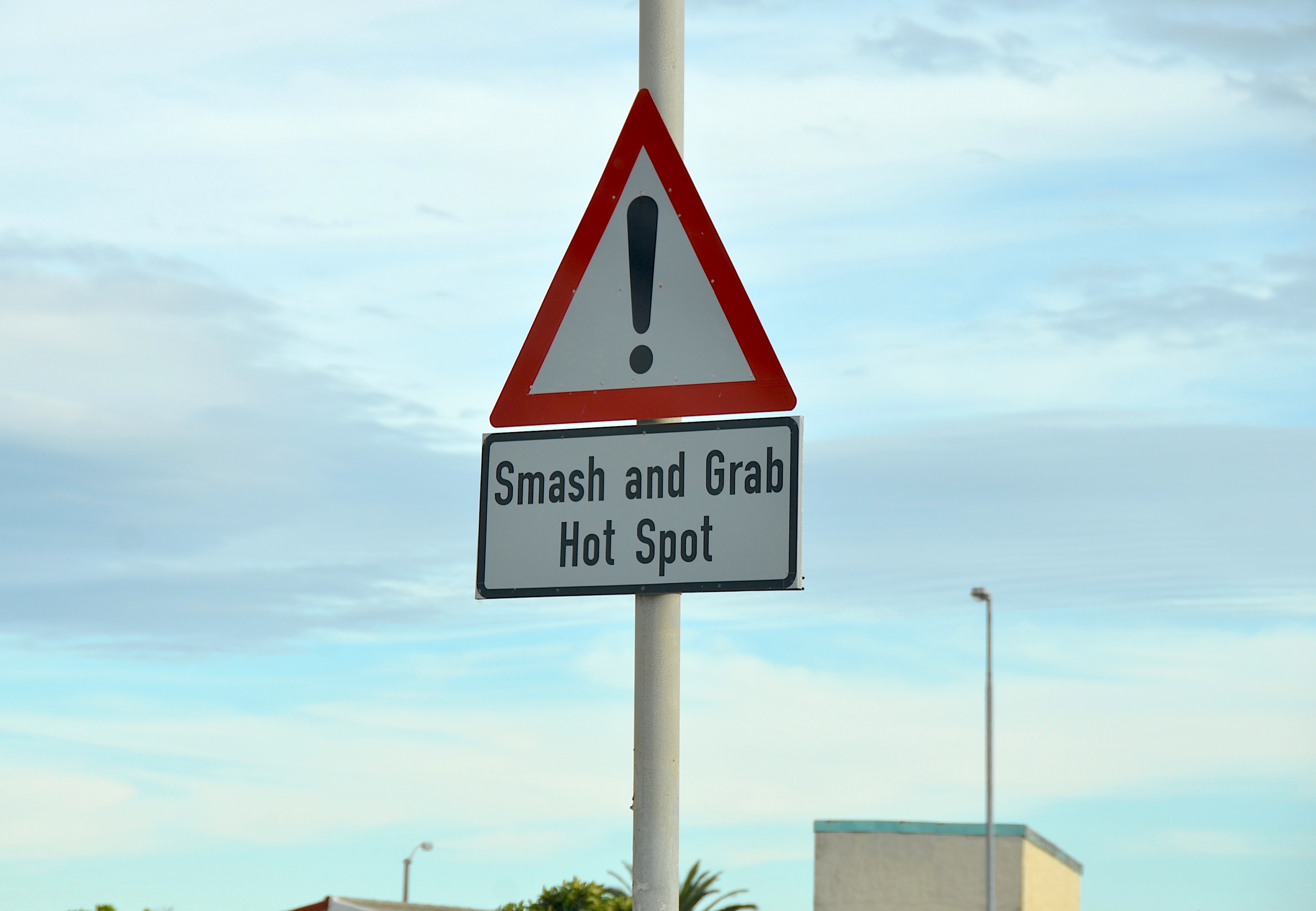
Smash and Grab Hot Spot at M5 through Retreat

== Koeberg interchange ==
The largest interchange on the M5 is the Koeberg interchange, connecting the M5 with the N1. The merging of lanes at this interchange used to result in multi-kilometer stop/start queues approaching the interchange on the M5.

=== Elevated freeway upgrade ===
In 2008, work began to upgrade the Koeberg interchange with elevated freeways joining the M5 and the N1. The elevated freeway from the N1 onto the M5 was completed in June 2010 in time for the 2010 FIFA World Cup, while the other direction was completed in November 2011.

== Design ==
The elevated freeways embody some innovative design features and principles. For example, the elevated freeways had to be built without disrupting the daily flow of some 200,000 vehicles. The existing roads and bridges had already used up the available land into which to expand. The intersection is hemmed in by a canal, railway reserve, power transformer, and industrial buildings, etc. Thus, the possibility of overlaying the existing structures with a bypass had to be envisioned with a system that could fit into the existing interchange.

Oval reinforced concrete pillars with "T" pieces atop, standing on foundations supported by concrete piles, could fit into the spaces between existing roads and bridges. These could in turn support post-tensioned concrete "U" beam spans, cast on the ground and lifted into place by crane. The road deck would be cast on top of the "U" beams. Five beams between each "T" topped pillar allowing for a double lane road deck. The beams resting on each side of the "T" piece support, are connected to each other and the deck by a concrete end which resists lateral-flexing of the deck between-beams.

The roadway on both elevated freeways narrows from a double lane to a single lane at the point where it connects with the existing N1 and the M5 motorways. At this point, the elevated freeway presents the motorist with a down-hill slope to encourage acceleration. The elevated freeway feeds into its own lanes on both of these existing freeways allowing acceleration and preventing congestion.

=== "U" beam spans ===
The "U" beams would have sloping sides like a "V" with a flat bottom. The forces at the centre of the span cause lateral inward compression at the bottom of the "V" and lateral outward compression transmitted into the deck as tension. The longitudinal tension, at the bottom of the "V" and at the centre of the span, is absorbed by potent post tensioned cable embedded in the concrete. Each beam rests on its ends, on purpose designed steel plates, which accommodate expansion and contraction and transmit the weight of the span into the "T" pieces atop the oval pillars.

The roadway deck would extend beyond the edge of the outer beams and be lined with pre-cast crash barriers.

=== Box girder bridges ===
Box girder bridges were conceived, designed and built to span the railway reserve and the long stretches over the outbound N1 carriageway and the northbound M5 carriageway as it approaches the N1. These had to be supported by scaffolding in the case of the end bridges and by "I-beam" steel trusses in the case of the railway reserve spans. The railway reserve also includes the height of the electrification services. This height added to the height of the "I-beam" steel trusses, the scaffolding on top of the trusses and the height of the box girder bridge is the determining factor in the extraordinary height of the new elevated freeway, which at its highest point is at the same height as the 5th story of the adjacent old mill building.

During construction of the end box girder bridges, the traffic had to be diverted round the supporting scaffolding. This was especially inconvenient on the outbound carriageway of the N1 where speed was severely reduced, adding heavily to congestion.

== Construction ==
Where the roadway deck extended beyond the edge of the outer beams, this would be made possible by the use of wooden triangular supports temporarily bolted to the outer beams and covered with concrete shutter-boards. The beams themselves would have pre-cast holes to accommodate the bolts holding the triangles in place.

=== "U" beams ===
Each "U" beam, weighing 80 metric tonnes, would be cast on the ground at a nearby designated temporary factory area between the N1 and the railway reserve. Each beam would be a specific length and be designated to be placed in the exact place for which it was designed. The beams would be cast on a set of reusable foundations and steel moulding panels supported by steel jacks. The beams would be transported on the ground by a purpose-built pair of 12 wheeled trucks, made of welded steel "I-beam" frames, each attached to the end of a concrete span "U" beam and then towed a short distance to the construction site by a conventional diesel mechanical horse.

=== Pillars ===
Each pillar and its "T" piece would be treated as a project in its own right. Purpose-built steel mouldings would be reused for each pillar and each pillar would be constructed in stages. The mouldings would be moved by cranes. Where the underlying ground was "soft", steel reinforced concrete piles would be driven into the base of the foundation hole and the upper protruding ends incorporated into the foundation.

=== Crash Barriers ===
The pre-cast crash barriers lining the edge of the deck would also be manufactured nearby using purpose made steel moulds. They would be bonded into place by having re-bar-steel loops protruding from both the edge of the road deck and also from the bottom of the barrier section. These loops would mate together when the barrier was placed and be affixed there by injecting concrete into the space between the deck and the barrier, permanently bonding the protruding loops together. Subsequently, a concrete guard rail would be cast on top of the crash barrier.

=== The Roadway deck ===
The deck would be constructed like any other reinforced concrete deck with the exception that the shuttering is designed to remain in place permanently and there is no use of scaffolding to support the shuttering. Pre-cast lip and groove formations on the upper edges of the "U" beams were designed to accommodate a thick Masonite type of shuttering board which would bear the weight of a man walking on them. The beams themselves provide a safe walk way for workers to access the section of road deck being constructed, during construction. When the steel reinforcing rod framework has been completed over the shuttering, a ready-mix concrete is pumped up from a mixer parked on the underlying roadways. This concrete is spread over the shuttering and reinforcing steel work and allowed to cure. Finally the deck is covered with a conventional asphalt macadamised tar and granite chip surface and marked with paint.

== Junctions list ==
Municipality	Location	km	mi	Exit	Destinations	Notes
Cape Town	Dunoon	0.0	0.0	—	N7, M12 Malibongwe Drive	At-grade intersection
Cape Town	Killarney Gardens	0.0	0.0	—	M14 Blaauwberg Road	At-grade intersection; Northern end of concurrency with M14
Cape Town	Montague Gardens	0.0	0.0	—	M14 Plattekloof Road	At-grade intersection; Southern end of concurrency with M14
Cape Town	Milnerton	0.0	0.0	—	M87 Omuramba Road	At-grade intersection
Cape Town	Milnerton	0.0	0.0	—	M8 Bosmansdam Road	At-grade intersection
Cape Town	Brooklyn	0.0	0.0	7	N1 F W de Klerk Boulevard	Koeberg interchange; Signed as exit 7 northbound only
Cape Town	Maitland	0.0	0.0	—	Royal Road, Koeberg Road south, Maitland	Southbound exit, northbound entrance
Cape Town	Ndabeni	0.0	0.0	8	M16 Berkley Road	
Cape Town	Mowbray	0.0	0.0	9A	N2 Settlers Way east, Cape Town International	Southbound exit only
Cape Town	Mowbray	0.0	0.0	9B	N2 Settlers Way west	Signed as exit 9 northbound
Cape Town	Mowbray	0.0	0.0	11	M18 Klipfontein Road west, M28 Milner Road	Southbound exit, northbound entrance
Cape Town	Athlone	0.0	0.0	12	M18 Klipfontein Road east	
Cape Town	Rondebosch	0.0	0.0	13	M43 Kromboom Road, Newlands	
Cape Town	Lansdowne	0.0	0.0	15	M24 Racecourse Road, Kenilworth Racecourse	
Cape Town	Plumstead	0.0	0.0	19	M68 Ottery Road	
Cape Town	Southfield	0.0	0.0	—	M38 De Waal Road	At-grade intersection
Cape Town	Grassy Park	0.0	0.0	—	M55 Klip Road	At-grade intersection
Cape Town	Grassy Park	0.0	0.0	—	M35 5th Avenue, Retreat Road	At-grade intersection
Cape Town	Steenberg	0.0	0.0	—	Military Road	At-grade intersection
Cape Town	Muizenberg	0.0	0.0	—	R304 Baden Powell Drive, Royal Road	Sunrise Circle; At-grade intersection

== See also ==
- Cape Town Government's view of the Koeberg Interchange
- Impact on century city
- Government empowerment plan
