= R310 (South Africa) =

Regional route in the Western Cape, South Africa

Regional route R310
- R310 route map
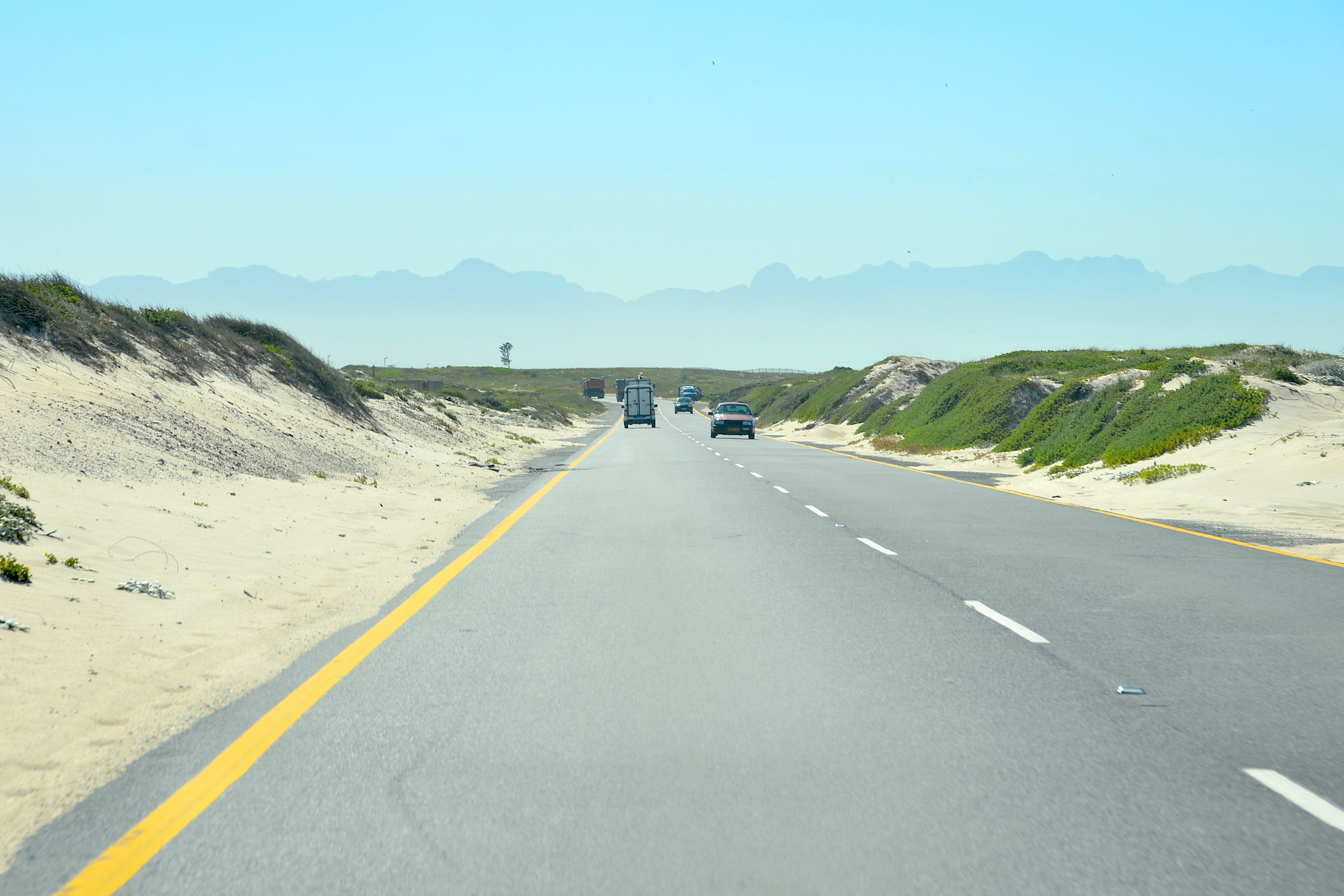
- The R310, facing east towards Somerset West

Route information
- Length: 61 km (38 mi)

Major junctions
- Southwest end: M4 in Muizenberg
- M5 in Muizenberg; M17 in Strandfontein; M7 in Mitchell's Plain; M22 in Mitchell's Plain M49 at Wolfgat M44 in Khayelitsha M45 in Khayelitsha; M9 in Khayelitsha; N2 exit 33 M49 in Eersterivier; R102 in Eersterivier; M12 near Stellenbosch; R44 / R304 in Stellenbosch
- Northeast end: R45 between Paarl and Franschhoek

Location
- Country: South Africa

Highway system
- Numbered routes of South Africa
← R309	→ R311

The R310 is a Regional Route in the Western Cape province of South Africa that connects Muizenberg to the south-west with the R45 between Paarl and Franschhoek to the north-east, via Stellenbosch and Hellshoogte Pass. The section between Muizenberg and Stellenbosch is called Baden Powell Drive.

== Route ==
The R310 begins in Muizenberg at an intersection with the M4 (Main Road). It runs east as Baden Powell Drive, meeting the southern terminus of the M5 (Prince George Drive), hugging the False Bay coast and passing in-between Strandfontein and the Wolfgat Nature Reserve before passing south of Mitchells Plain, where it meets the southern terminus of the M7 (Jakes Gerwel Drive). The R310 continues eastwards to bypass the township of Khayelitsha, where it turns away from the coast towards the north-east and meets the M9 (Macassar Road; Japhta K Masemola Road) before crossing the N2 freeway.

The R310 continues north-east, still named Baden Powell Drive, skirting Eersterivier to the east, to enter Stellenbosch, where it meets the eastern terminus of the M12 (Adam Tas Road) at a T-junction. The R310 takes over as Adam Tas Road and heads eastwards for 4 kilometres into the Stellenbosch CBD to reach a junction with the R44 (Strand Road). The R310 joins the R44 and they are co-signed northwards through the CBD as Adam Tas Road, meeting the south-eastern terminus of the R304 (Koelenhof Road). Just after meeting the R304, the R310 splits from the R44 to become the Hellshoogte Pass towards the east. It heads for 16 kilometres, bending north-eastwards, passing through Pniel, to reach its end at an intersection with the R45 approximately 7 kilometres west of Wemmershoek.
