= M11 (Cape Town) =

South African metropolitan route

Metropolitan route M11

Route information
- Maintained by City of Cape Town and Western Cape Department of Transport and Public Works
- Length: 2 km (1.2 mi)

Major junctions
- East end: M10 Bellville
- West end: M16 Bellville Central

Location
- Country: South Africa

Highway system
- Numbered routes of South Africa
← M10	→ M12

The M11 is a short metropolitan route in the City of Cape Town, South Africa. It consists of one street (Tienie Meyer Bypass) in the Bellville CBD.

== Route ==
The M11 begins at a junction with the M16 (Francie van Zijl Road) and heads eastwards for 2 kilometres to end at a junction with the M10 (Robert Sobukwe Road).
