= Firgrove, Western Cape =

Town in Western Cape, South Africa

Firgrove
- Location within Western Cape Location within South Africa
- Coordinates: 34.0549539°S 18.7838779°E
- Country: South Africa
- Province: Western Cape
- Municipality: City of Cape Town

Area
  - Total: 0.64 km^{2} (0.25 sq mi)

Population (2011)
  - Total: 1,891
  - Density: 3,000/km^{2} (7,700/sq mi)

Racial makeup (2011)
  - Coloured: 90.96%
  - Black African: 4.92%
  - Other: 3.65%
  - Indian/Asian: 0.26%
  - White: 0.21%

First languages (2011)
  - Afrikaans: 68.10%
  - English: 22.75%
  - Northern Sotho: 4.23%
  - Other: 2.75%
  - Xhosa: 1.11%
  - Tswana: 0.32%
  - Southern Ndebele: 0.32%
  - Zulu: 0.26%
  - Sign Language: 0.11%
  - Venda: 0.05%
- Time zone: UTC+2 (SAST)
- Postal code (street): 7110

Firgrove is a small town located 39 kilometres (24.2 mi) south-east of Cape Town and 7 kilometres (4.3 mi) west of Somerset West in the Western Cape province of South Africa.

== Transport ==
=== Roads ===
Firgrove is situated along the R102 (Old Main Road) between Kuilsrivier to the north-west and Somerset West to the south-east.

Alternatively, Firgrove can also be accessed via the N2 (to Cape Town and Somerset West) at the M9 Macassar Road interchange or via the M9 (Main Road; Macassar Road) connecting Macassar to the south with Heldervue (a suburb of Somerset West) to the east.
