= M12 (Cape Town) =

South African metropolitan route

Metropolitan route M12
- M12 route map

Route information
- Maintained by City of Cape Town and Western Cape Department of Transport and Public Works
- Length: 34.5 km (21.4 mi)

Major junctions
- North end: M13 at Burgundy Estate
- M8 / M14 near Edgemead; M26 in Panorama; N1 near Panorama; M25 in Parow; R102 in Parow; M16 in Elsie's River M151 in Elsie's River; M10 near Belhar; M71 in Belhar M171 in Belhar M180 in Belhar; R300 near Kuilsrivier M182 in Kuilsrivier M174 in Kuilsrivier; R102 in Kuilsrivier
- South end: R310 near Stellenbosch

Location
- Country: South Africa

Highway system
- Numbered routes of South Africa
← M11	→ M13

The M12 is a long metropolitan route in the City of Cape Town, South Africa. It connects Burgundy Estate with Stellenbosch via Parow, Elsie's River and Kuilsrivier.

== Route ==
The M12 begins at a junction with the M13 at Burgundy Estate in Milnerton, north of Cape Town. It begins by going eastwards for a few metres as Sienna Drive before turning southwards as Giel Basson Drive. It flies over the M14 (Plattekloof Road) and meets the M8 (Bosmansdam Road) before separating the Monte Vista and Panorama suburbs and flying over the N1 highway. Just after crossing the N1, it separates the Goodwood and Parow suburbs and reaches a junction with the R102 (Voortrekker Road).

From the R102 junction, the M12 continues southwards through Elsie's River to reach a junction with the M10 (Robert Sobukwe Road) north of Cape Town International Airport, where it turns to the east as Stellenbosch Arterial road. It passes through the Belhar suburb before meeting and crossing the R300 freeway (Kuils River Freeway) and passing through the southern part of Kuilsrivier, where it forms another junction with the R102 (Van Riebeeck Road). The M12 continues eastwards as Polkadraai Road, leaving the City of Cape Town and entering the Stellenbosch Local Municipality, to reach its end at a junction with the R310 (Baden Powell Drive; Adam Tas Road) about 4 kilometres west of the Stellenbosch town centre.
