= M8 (Cape Town) =

South African metropolitan route

Metropolitan route M8

Route information
- Maintained by City of Cape Town and Western Cape Department of Transport and Public Works
- Length: 6.5 km (4.0 mi)

Major junctions
- East end: M14 in Kleinbosch
- M12 in Edgemead; N7 in Edgemead M87 in Milnerton
- West end: M5 in Milnerton

Location
- Country: South Africa

Highway system
- Numbered routes of South Africa
← M7	→ M9

The M8 is a short metropolitan route in Cape Town, South Africa. It connects Milnerton with Edgemead.

== Route ==
The M8 begins at a junction with the M5 (Koeberg Road) in Milnerton. It heads eastwards, crossing the N7 highway, to enter Edgemead, where it meets the M12 (Giel Basson Drive) and ends immediately thereafter at a junction with the M14 (Plattekloof Road).
