= Southfield, Cape Town =

Southfield
- Interactive map of Southfield
- Coordinates: 34°02′04″S 18°28′59″E
- Country: South Africa
- Province: Western Cape
- Municipality: City of Cape Town
- Main Place: Cape Town

Government
  - Councillor: Kevin Southgate (Ward 72) (Democratic Alliance)

Area
  - Total: 1.91 km^{2} (0.74 sq mi)

Population (2011)
  - Total: 7,106
  - Density: 3,720/km^{2} (9,640/sq mi)

Racial makeup (2011)
  - Black African: 10.1%
  - Coloured: 52.8%
  - Indian/Asian: 2.1%
  - White: 31.3%
  - Other: 3.7%

First languages (2011)
  - English: 81.3%
  - Afrikaans: 13.8%
  - Xhosa: 0.9%
  - Other: 4.0%
- Time zone: UTC+2 (SAST)
- Postal code (street): 7880
- Area code: 021

Southfield is a residential suburb located in the Southern Suburbs of Cape Town in the Western Cape Province of South Africa. It is situated between Plumstead and Diep River along the M5 highway. According to the 2011 census, Southfield has a population of 7,106 people and 2,155 households.
