= Rocklands, Mitchells Plain =

Suburb of Cape Town, in Western Cape, South Africa

Rocklands
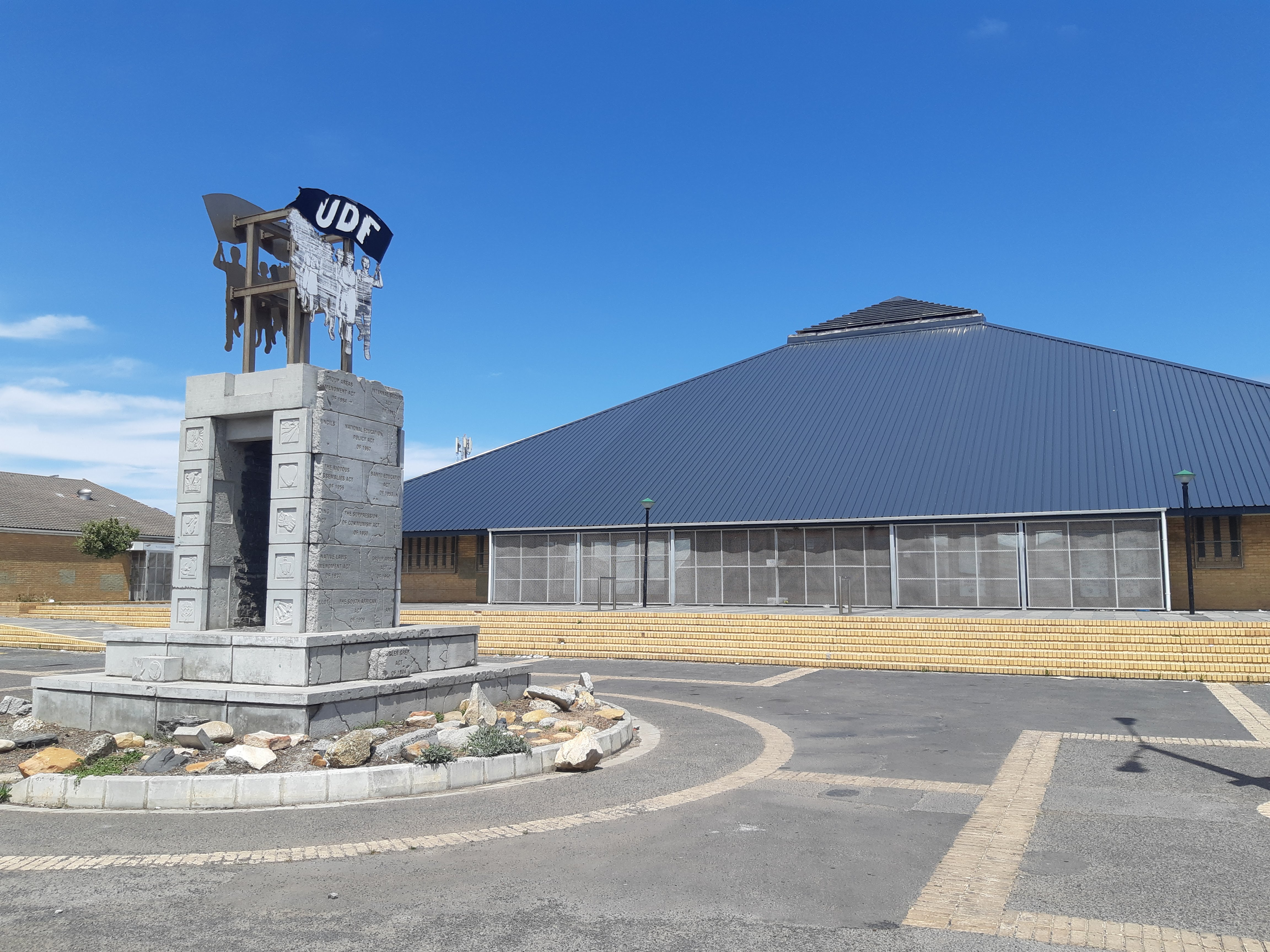
- The Rocklands Community Hall in Rocklands, Cape Town. The UDF monument celebrating the formation of the United Democratic Front in the hall is in the foreground.
- Interactive map of Rocklands
- Coordinates: 34.064°S 18.609°E
- Country: South Africa
- Province: Western Cape
- Municipality: City of Cape Town
- Main Place: Mitchells Plain, Cape Town

Area
  - Total: 3.11 km^{2} (1.20 sq mi)

Population (2011)
  - Total: 29,782
  - Density: 9,580/km^{2} (24,800/sq mi)

Racial makeup (2011)
  - Black African: 2.48%
  - Coloured: 96.35%
  - Indian/Asian: 0.52%
  - White: 0.17%
  - Other: 0.48%

First languages (2011)
  - Afrikaans: 50.98%
  - English: 47.02%
  - Sign language: 0.41%
- Time zone: UTC+2 (SAST)

Rocklands is a neighborhood in the southwestern corner of the Mitchells Plain urban area of the City of Cape Town in the Western Cape province of South Africa. The community of Strandfontein is to its immediate west.

On 20 August 1983 the United Democratic Front, an important anti-apartheid organisation, was founded at the Rocklands Community Hall.

== Sources ==
- Vorster, Jakobus M. (27 March 2015). "The possible contribution of civil society in the moral edification of South African society: The example of the 'United Democratic Front' and the 'Treatment Action Campaign' (1983–2014)". HTS Teologiese Studies / Theological Studies. 71 (3). doi:10.4102/hts.v71i3.2754.
- "United Democratic Front (UDF)". South African History Online.
