= Italtile =

South African home improvement retail chain

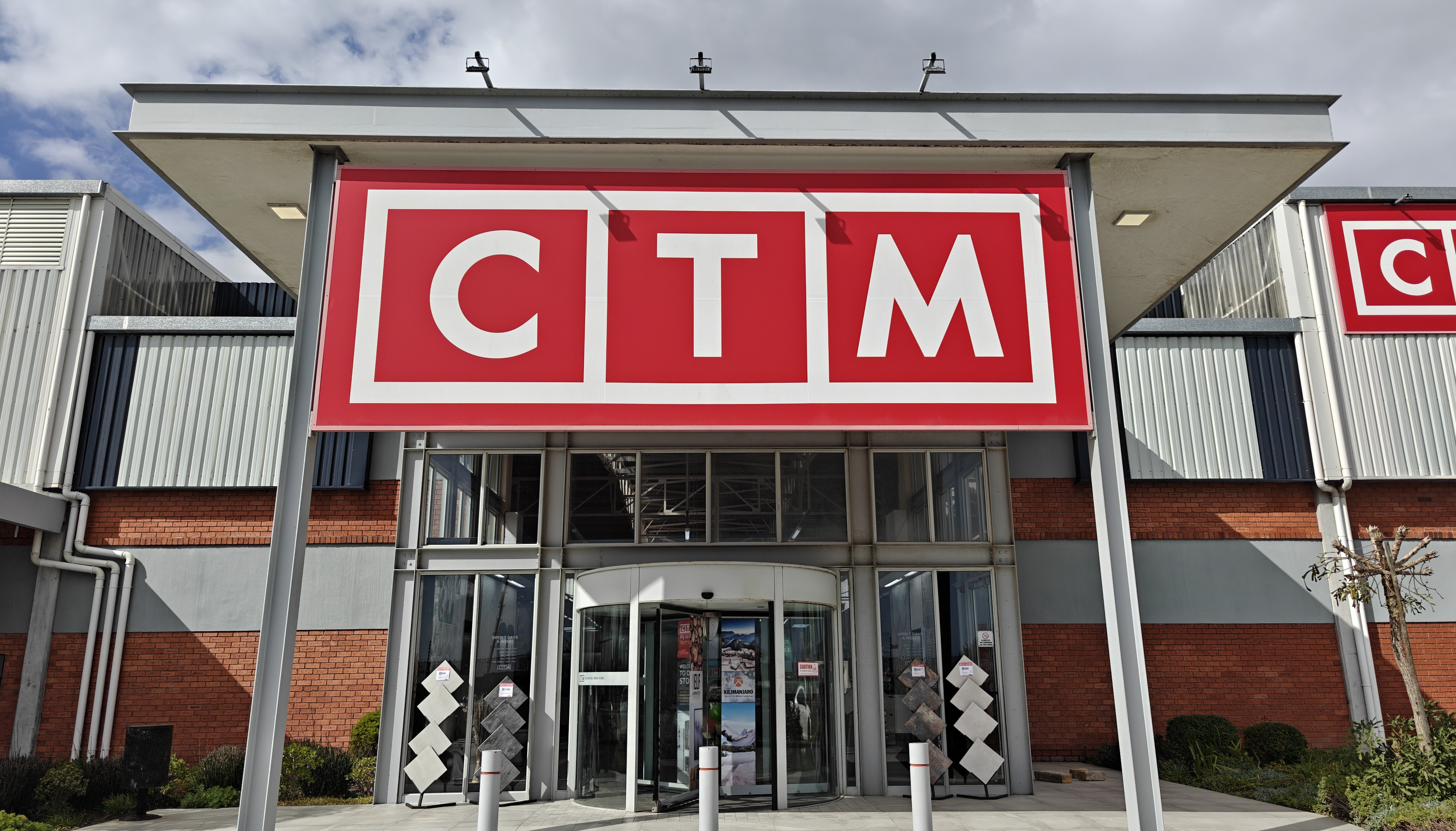
- The entrance of a CTM store in Montague Gardens, Cape Town
- Type: Public
- Traded as: JSE: ITA
- ISIN: ZAE000099123
- Industry: Home improvement
- Founded: 1969; 57 years ago
- Headquarters: Sandton, South Africa
- Number of locations: 203 (2025)
- Area served: Southern Africa; East Africa
- Key people: Lance Foxcroft (CEO); Luciana Ravazzotti Langenhoven (Chairwoman)
- Products: Tiles; Bathroom fixtures Kitchen fixtures
- Brands: CTM; Italtile
- Services: Residential contracting
- Revenue: ▼ R8.87 billion (2025)
- Operating income: ▲ R2.06 billion (2025)
- Net income: ▲ R1.49 billion (2025)
- Total assets: ▲ R10.86 billion (2025)
- Total equity: ▲ R8.65 billion (2025)
- Number of employees: 3,188 (2025)
- Website: italtile.com

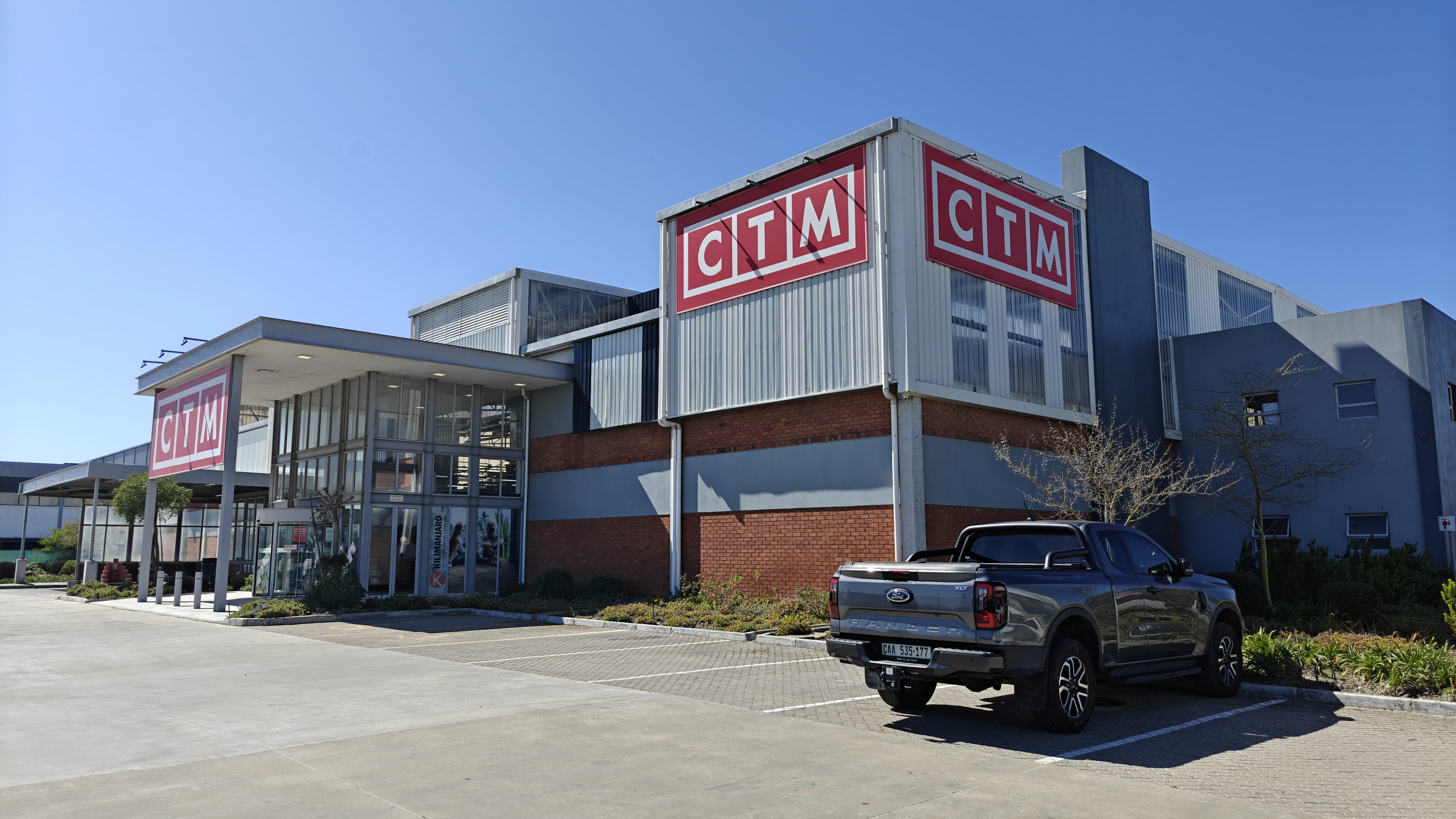
CTM store in Cape Town

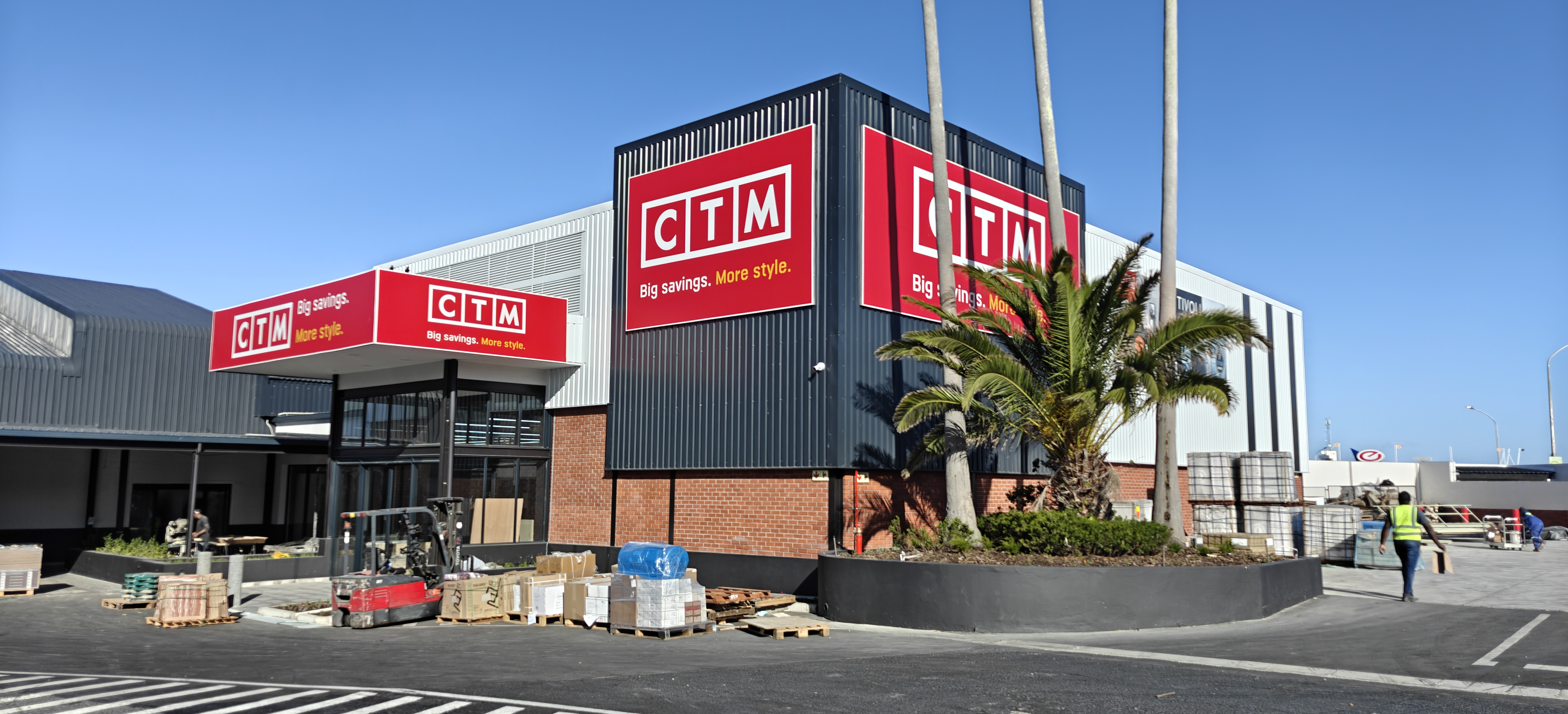
Recently-built CTM store in Tokai, Cape Town

Italtile (officially Italtile Limited), is a South African home improvement company, listed on the JSE Limited, that operates numerous retail chain brands across Africa.

Founded in 1969, and headquartered in Johannesburg, Italtile operates 203 stores across Southern and East Africa, focusing on tiles, bathroom fixtures, and kitchen fixtures. Its largest retail brand is CTM.

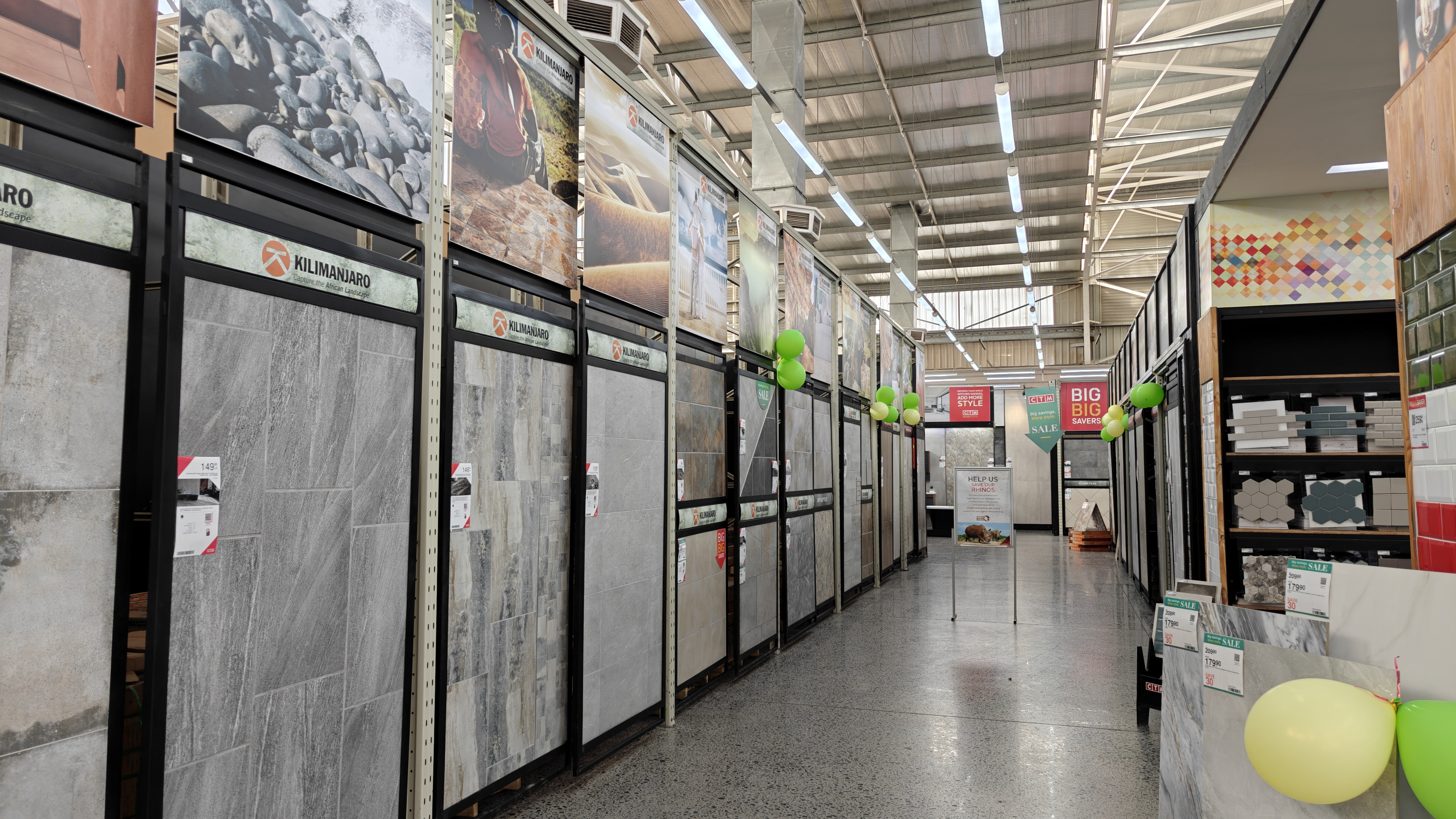
Tile section in a CTM store in Cape Town

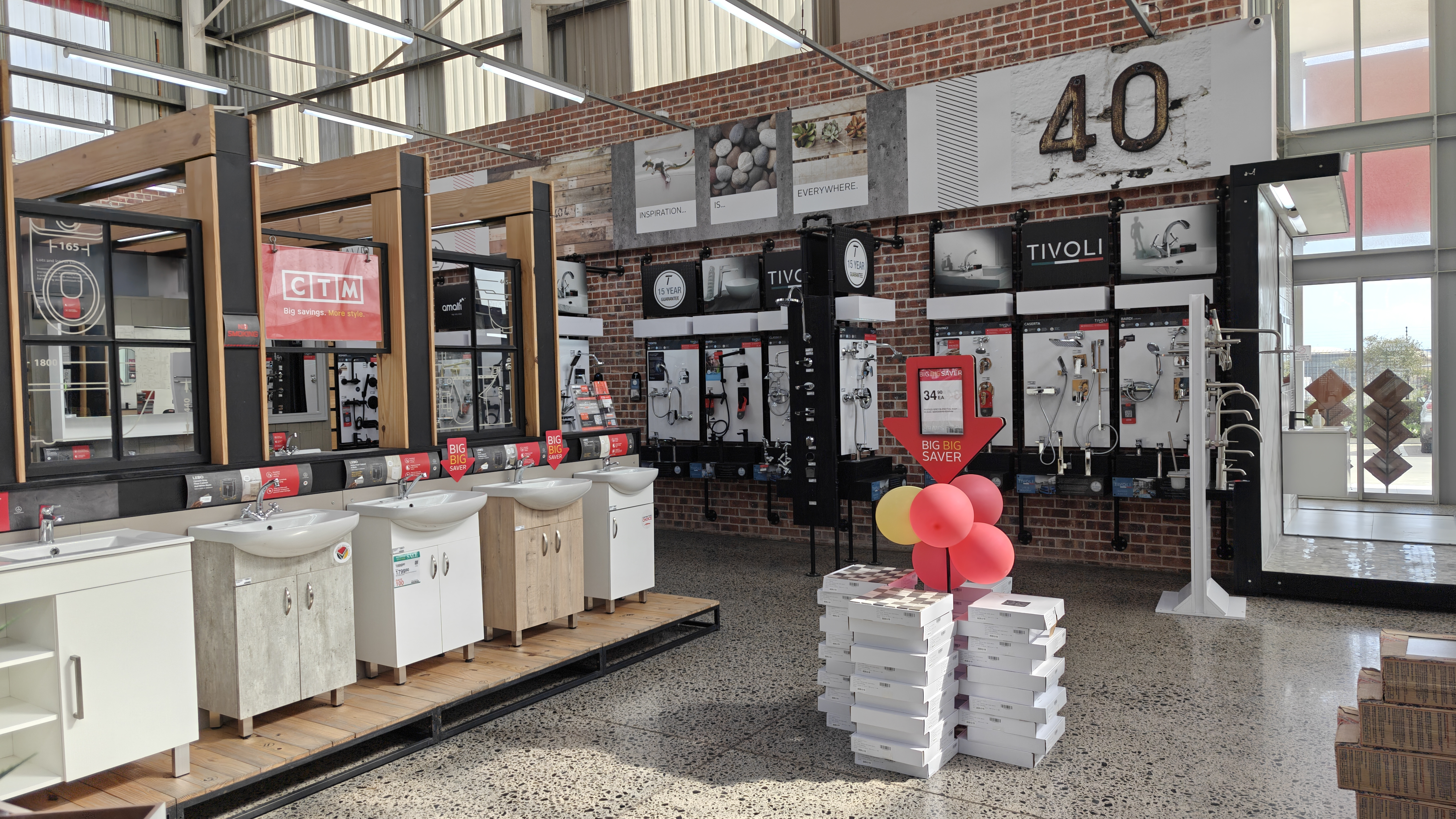
Bathroom section in a CTM store in Cape Town

== History ==
Italtile was founded in 1969, by Gianni Ravazzotti, as Italtile Retail. The company began importing tiles from Italy, and sold them through a store in Alberton, Gauteng.

In 1971, the group opened its first stores in Cape Town and Durban, and its first store in Johannesburg in 1972.

The group opened the Samca Floor tile factory in 1976.

In 1983, Italtile opened the first store under its CTM brand, in Roodepoort, Gauteng. In the same year, another CTM store was opened in Stikland, Bellville.

In 1988, Italtile Limited listed on the JSE, South Africa's largest stock exchange. The following year, the group's head office moved to Randburg, Gauteng.

Italtile moved its head office once again, in 2000, to Bryanston, Sandton where it remains today. In the same year, the group began trading in Australia.

In 2002, Italtile Limited reached group revenue of R1 billion. This had increased to R5 billion by 2015.

As of 2024, Italtile manufactured 50% of all tiles purchased in South Africa.

== Operations ==
The Italtile Group sells tiles, as well as kitchen and bathroom fixtures, at stores across Southern and Eastern Africa. It offers numerous brands that are exclusive to the company, including Kilimanjaro, Amalfi, Tivoli, Organic Earth, Diva, Quadratec, Styletec, Megatec, Betta, Homegrown, NuVinyl, Elf, ProGrip, and Promax.

Italtile operates three different store brands; Italtile Retail (premium offering), CTM (mid-market), and TopT (budget stores).

As of 2025, the group has a network of 203 stores across all of its retail brands, including 14 Italtile Retail, 94 CTM, and 95 TopT stores.

The group has stores located in Southern and East Africa, with most outlets being situated in South Africa.

Italtile Group owns import companies International Tap Distributors, Cedar Point, and Distribution Centre, with facilities in the Western Cape, Gauteng, and KwaZulu-Natal provinces. Italtile also has 17 factories under its Ceramic Industries and Ezee Tile subsidiaries (with the majority being in South Africa, 1 in Australia, and the rest across Africa). Italtile also has a 30% shareholding in Easylife Kitchens.

Export markets for Italtile include Kenya, the DRC, Angola, Malawi, Mauritius, Zimbabwe, Mozambique, and Madagascar.

The company has the capacity to produce 52 million m2 of tiles annually.

Italtile has a property portfolio that, as of 2025, is valued at around R4 billion.

As of 2025, 16% of Italtile's revenue comes from franchising, 15% from real estate investments, 16% from supply and support services, 28% from manufacturing, and 25% from retail.

== Corporate social responsibility ==
Italtile's corporate social responsibility division and Foundation spent R114 million on social initiatives during the company's 2024 financial year.

The group employs carbon reduction initiatives, and in 2024, it generated over 8,000 MWh of solar power.

== See also ==
- Retailing in South Africa
