= Montague Gardens, Cape Town =

Montague Gardens
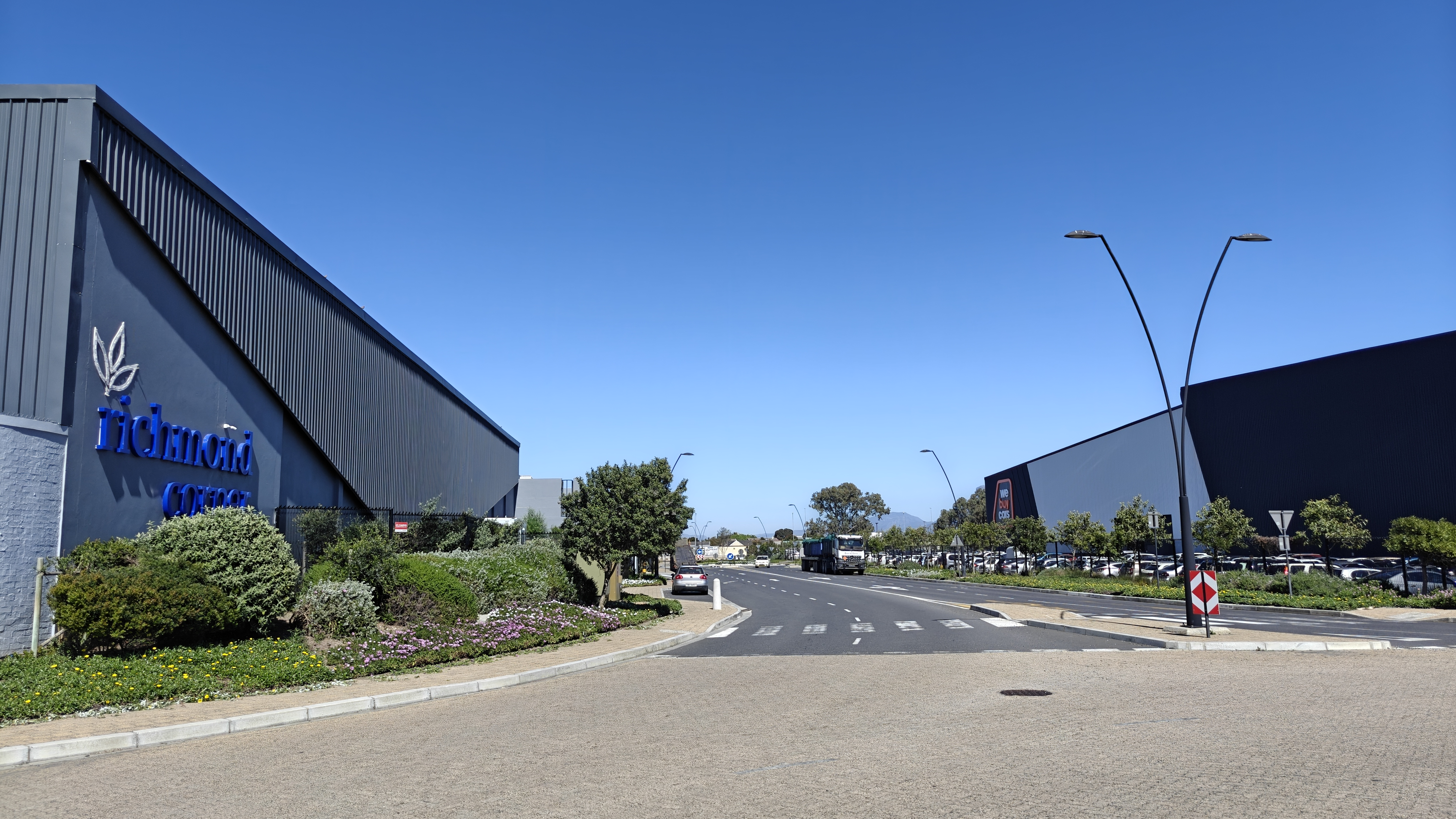
- Richmond Park, a modern industrial park in Montague Gardens
- Interactive map of Montague Gardens
- Coordinates: 33.8611°S 18.5214°E
- Country: South Africa
- Province: Western Cape
- Municipality: City of Cape Town

Area
  - Total: 4.23 km^{2} (1.63 sq mi)

Population (2011)
  - Total: 22
  - Density: 5.2/km^{2} (13/sq mi)

Racial makeup (2011)
  - Black African: 81.82%
  - Coloured: 13.64%
  - Asian: 4.55%

First languages (2011)
  - Afrikaans: 18.18%
  - English: 27.27%
  - Xhosa: 27.27%
  - Zulu: 22.73
  - Other: 4.55%
- Time zone: UTC+2 (SAST)
- Postal code (street): 7441
- PO box: 7441

Montague Gardens is an industrial area in the Northern Suburbs region of Cape Town, South Africa. The suburb comprises many warehouses, large format stores, and distribution centers.

As at the South African 2011 census, the area had a population of just 22 residents.

== Location ==
Montague Gardens is located just off the N7 highway, in the Northern Suburbs of Cape Town. The area is situated roughly 15 km from Cape Town CBD, 15 km from the Port of Cape Town, and 20 km from Cape Town International Airport.

The suburb is separated from Cape Town's other major industrial neighborhoods, like Epping, Parow, Ndabeni, and Paarden Eiland, by the mixed-use suburb of Century City.

Neighboring suburbs include Milnerton Ridge, Milnerton, Edgemead, Bothasig, and Summer Greens.

== Commerce ==
Companies with a retail presence in Montague Gardens include Italtile, Dulux, Bostik, Coricraft, PPC, BUCO, and Defy.

Companies housing distribution centers in the area include Woolworths, Decofurn, Clicks, and Takealot.

== Gallery ==
Images of Montague Gardens
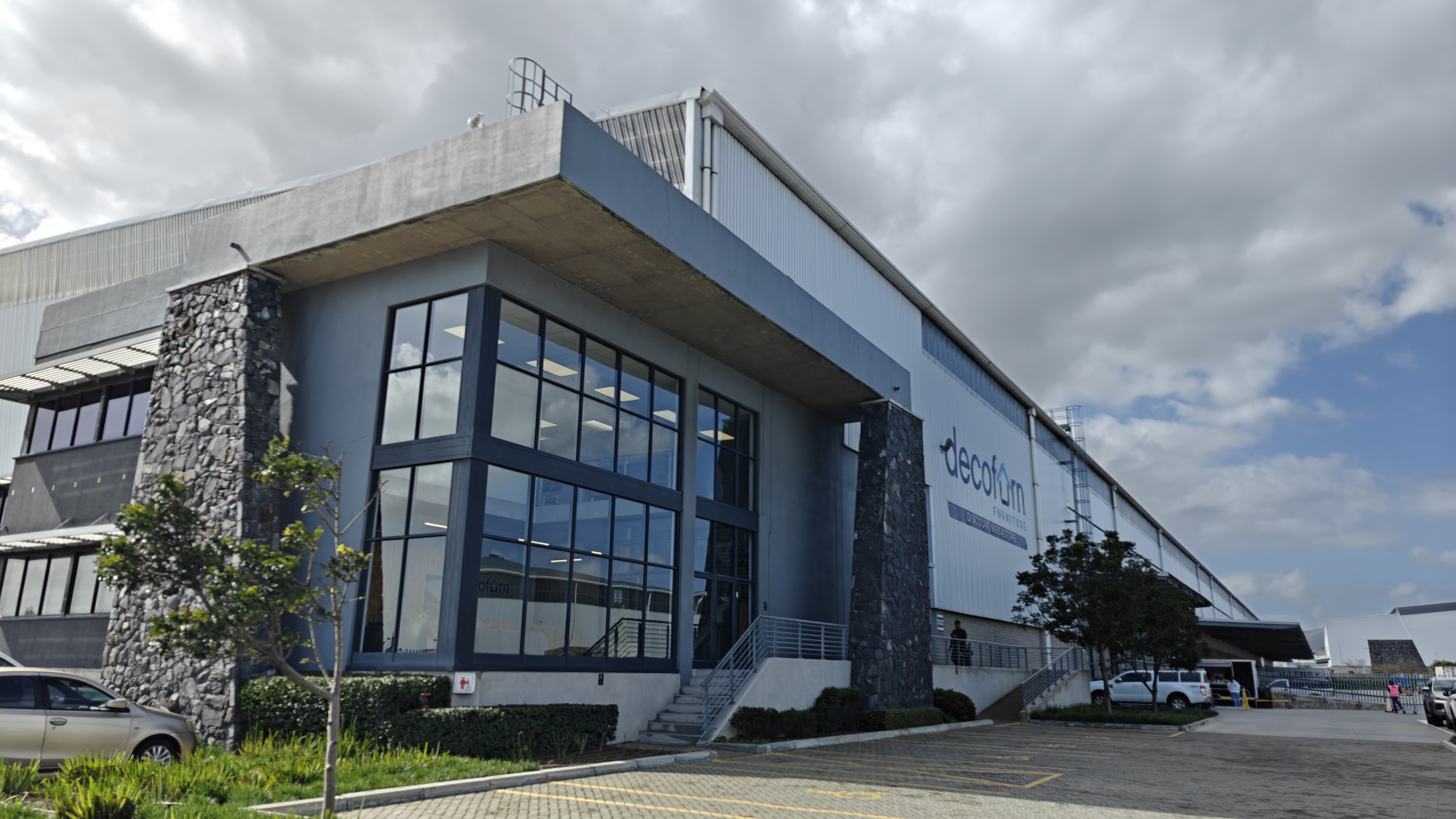
Furniture retail chain Decofurn's headquarters, showroom, and distribution center

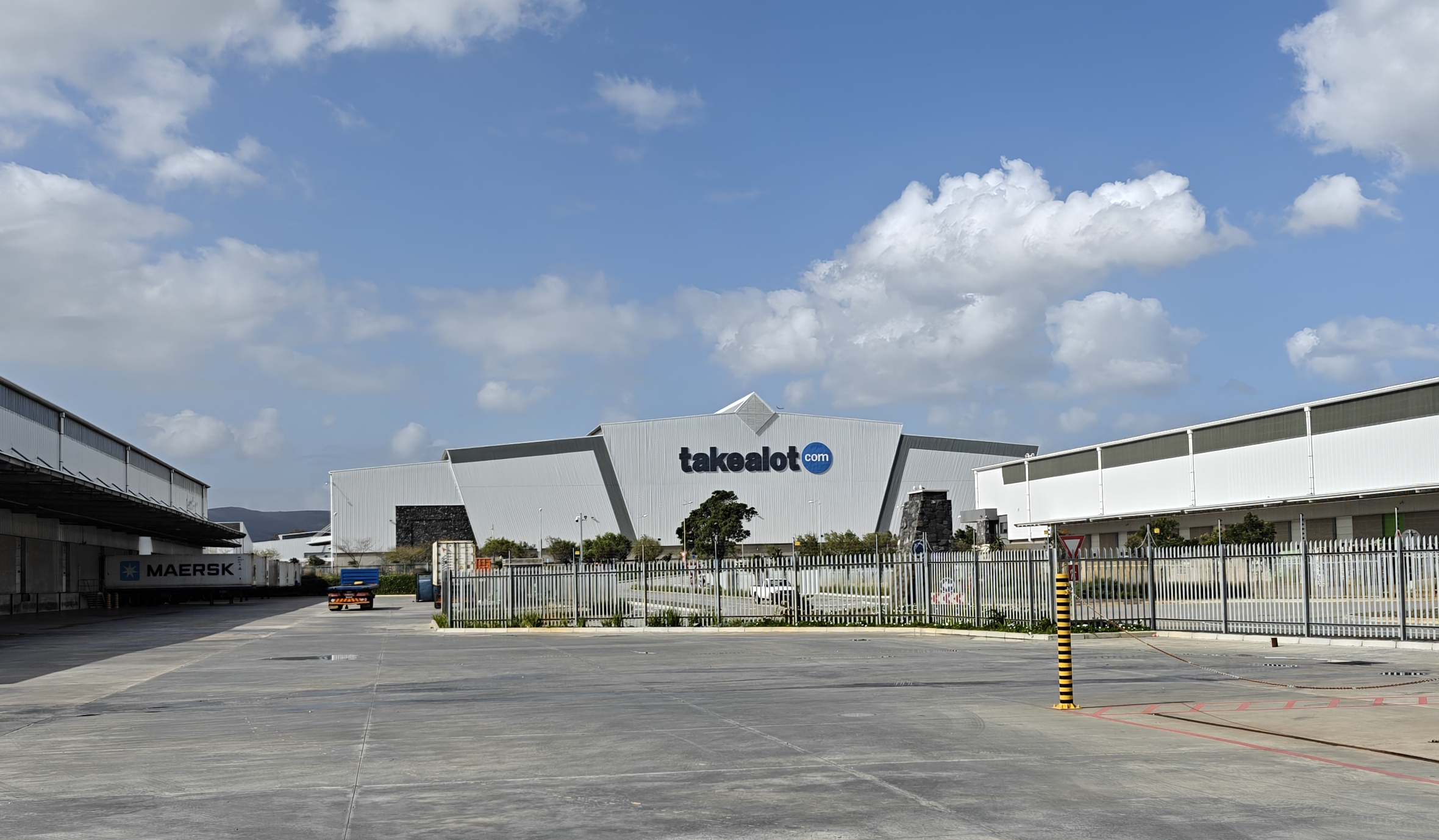
E-commerce retailer Takealot's distribution center

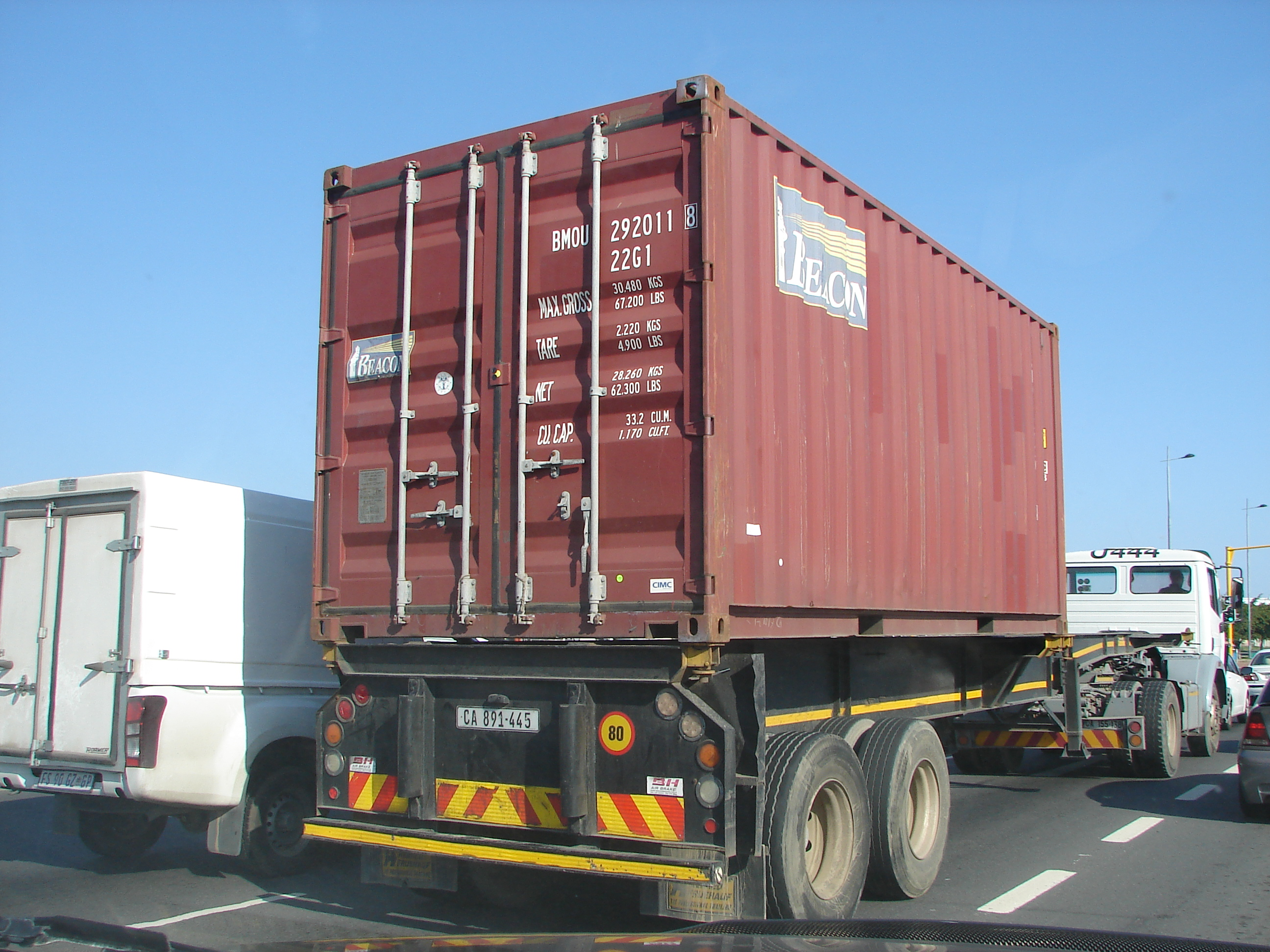
20 foot shipping container on the back of a truck
