= Matroosfontein =

Suburb of Cape Town, in Western Cape, South Africa

- Location within Western Cape Location within South Africa
- Coordinates: 33°55′59″S 18°34′59″E
- Country: South Africa
- Province: Western Cape
- Municipality: City of Cape Town

Area
  - Total: 25.44 km^{2} (9.82 sq mi)

Population (2011)
  - Total: 77,121
  - Density: 3,031/km^{2} (7,852/sq mi)

Racial makeup (2011)
  - Black African: 7%
  - Coloured: 91%
  - Indian/Asian: 0.48%
  - White: 0.13%
  - Other: 1.46%

First languages (2011)
  - Afrikaans: 82%
  - English: 13%
  - Xhosa: 4%
  - Other: 0.39%
- Time zone: UTC+2 (SAST)
- Postal code (street): 7490
- PO box: 7480

Matroosfontein is a suburb in Cape Town, South Africa, located near the Cape Town International Airport. It is a predominantly residential area. While originally established for the Coloured community during the apartheid era, Matroosfontein now includes African, Cape Malay, and other ethnic groups. During apartheid, Matroosfontein was part of the government's forced relocation policies, which moved non-white residents from the city center to outlying areas.
