= Epping, Cape Town =

Epping
- Location within Western Cape Location within South Africa
- Coordinates: 33°56′03″S 18°32′37″E
- Country: South Africa
- Province: Western Cape
- Municipality: City of Cape Town

Government
  - Councillor: Christopher Jordaan (28) (DA); Michael Britz (30) (DA); Brian Watkyns (53) (DA)

Area
  - Total: 6.18 km^{2} (2.39 sq mi)

Population (2011)
  - Total: 50
  - Density: 8.1/km^{2} (21/sq mi)

Racial makeup (2011)
  - Black African: 30.0%
  - Coloured: 66.0%
  - Other: 4.0%

First languages (2011)
  - Afrikaans: 78.0%
  - Xhosa: 14.0%
  - English: 4.0%
  - Zulu: 2.0%
  - Other: 2.0%
- Time zone: UTC+2 (SAST)

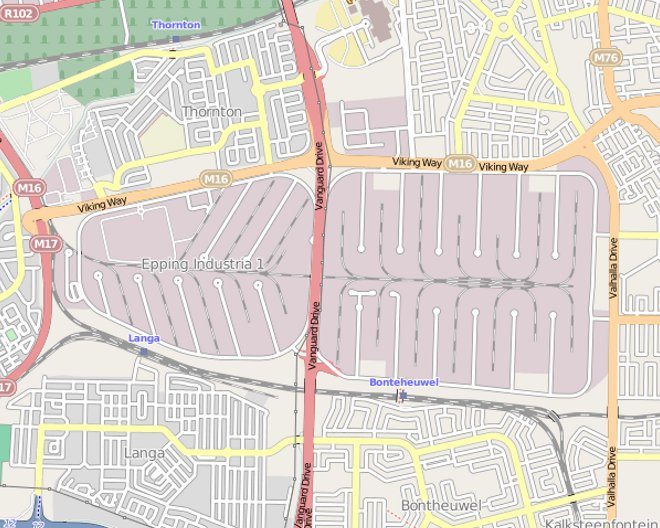
Map of Epping Industria

Epping is an industrial area of Cape Town that is situated to the south of Thornton, east of Pinelands and north of Langa.

Epping Industria was first developed in the late 1940s. Industrial development was initially slow and in the early 1950s the circular Gunners Circle was used as a race track for cars. When industrial development picked up in the late 1950s the racing was stopped. The completion of the Athlone Power Station close by assisted in the proliferation of industrial businesses into the area in the mid 1960s.

Epping Industria is the largest and most centrally situated industrial area in greater Cape Town. Its proximity to the major roadways and the availability of most forms of public transport make it an extremely sought after location for business. The area hosts a number of companies involved in the textile, automotive, logistics, construction, recycling and food processing industries. Nampak, Africa's largest packaging company, is one of the largest companies to have operations in Epping. Other large companies in Epping Industria are SA Metal Group, Distell Ltd, AVI Ltd and Afrox.

The Cape Town Market is one of the oldest and largest fresh produce markets in South Africa. It is over 50 years old and services over 5500 producers delivering fresh produce to market agents, who in turn sell the fresh produce to over 8000 registered buyers.

Epping Industria is managed by the Epping Community Improvement District (ECID) whereby all owners contribute to the operating costs of the ECID. The ECID assists the City of Cape Town to look after aspects such as cleaning, security, emergency management and traffic management.
