= Macassar Dunes Conservation Area =

Coastal nature reserve in Macassar, Cape Town, South Africa

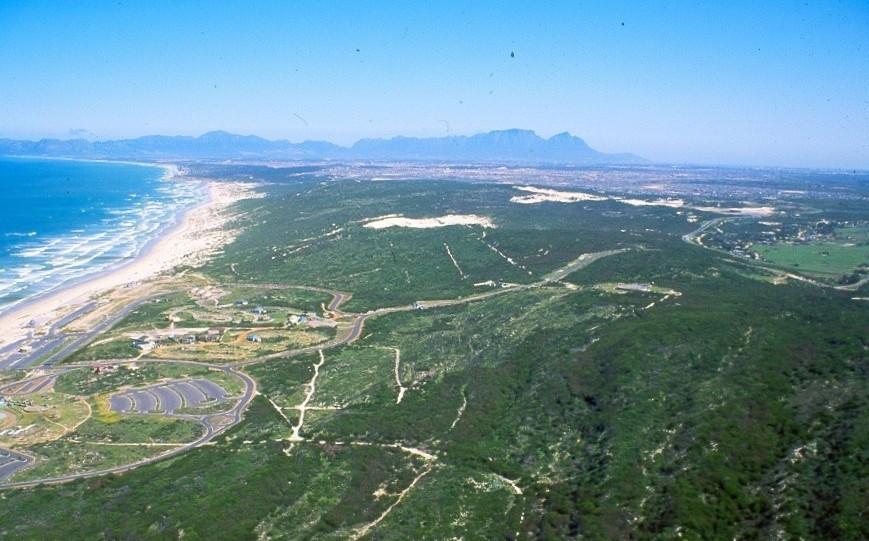
- Macassar Dunes viewed from the air, with the Cape Flats and Table Mountain in the distance

- Location within Cape Town
- Location: Macassar, Western Cape, South Africa
- Coordinates: 34°04′15″S 18°45′15″E
- Area: 1,116 ha (2,760 acres)

Macassar Dunes Conservation Area is a 1,116-hectare (2,760-acre) coastal nature reserve in Macassar, within the City of Cape Town, South Africa.

== Biodiversity ==
This conservation area conserves the unique local “Cape Flats Dune Strandveld” vegetation with its dense evergreen thickets, flowers, shrubs and trees. The last remaining forest of the endangered White Milkwood tree (Sideroxylon inerme) on the Cape Flats is found on this reserve, and it is also home to the largest and highest dune system on the Cape Peninsula. Many of the 178 plant species that can be found here burst into flower in spring time, covering the dunes with colour. Animal species found here include buck, tortoises, porcupine, hares, mongoose and a variety of bird species.

== History ==
The area was originally inhabited by the Khoi-khoi people who had lived at the Cape for centuries. In the 1600s under colonial rule, the first Muslim community in South Africa was founded here by Sheikh Yusuf of Indonesia, who named the area after his home in Indonesia – the original Khoi name for the area was not recorded. The shrine (or “kramat”) of Sheikh Yusuf is located on a hill on the eastern edge of the reserve and is still a site of worship and pilgrimage. Even up until today, Muslims from all over South Africa still make their way to the Kramat in Macassar to camp for the entire Easter weekend.

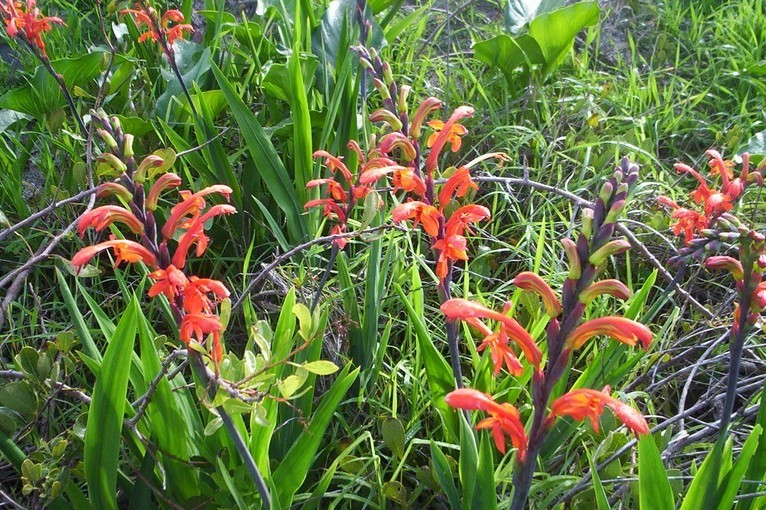
The local Cape Flats Dune Strandveld vegetation

== Threats and Conservation ==
The local ecosystem is classified as endangered and what is left of it is under threat from alien invasive plants like Acacia cyclops (“Rooikrans”), sand-mining and the rapid spread of informal settlements which is threatening to engulf the nature reserve. Shacks built on the dunes destroy the vegetation that is holding the sands in place. Consequently masses of mobile wind-swept sand become a problem. Areas that are infested with Acacia cyclops also burn much more easily, frequently and fiercely. These too-frequent fires reduce the ability of the indigenous vegetation to regenerate and are also a danger to the people of the neighbouring informal settlements.

However, community involvement in the management of the reserve is increasing. It is used by local people for hiking, whale watching, environmental education, school excursions and fishing. In addition, traditional healers gather plants and animals from the reserve to use in traditional medicine. The reserve also provides shelter for the communities from the strong winds and sand from the coast, as well as being a protection from storm damage and a source of fresh water.

== See also ==
- Biodiversity of Cape Town
- List of nature reserves in Cape Town
- Cape Flats Dune Strandveld
