= Metropolitan routes in Cape Town =

Major intra-city road routes

Cape Town metropolitan 1 route marker

Cape Town metropolitan 12 route marker

The City of Cape Town (Cape Town metropolitan area) like most South African metropolitan areas, uses metropolitan or "M" routes for important intra-city routes, a layer below national (N) roads and regional (R) roads. Each city's M roads are independently numbered.

== Table of M roads ==
No.	Direction	Description of route	Suburbs	Street names
M3	North–south	M62 (Central) – M96 – M59 – M60 (start highway) – N2 (merge) – N2 (demerge) – M89 (interchange) – M146 (interchange, end highway) – M63 – M33 – start highway – M155 (interchange) – M41 (interchange) – M38 (interchange) – M39 (interchange) – M40 (interchange) – M42 (end freeway (Kirstenhof)	Central, Gardens, District Six, Woodstock, Observatory, Mowbray, Rosebank, Groote Schuur Estate, Newlands, Claremont, Wynberg, Constantia, Barbarossa, Deurdrif, Belle Constantia, Sweet Valley, Dennendal, Tokai, Kirstenhof	Buitensingel, Orange Street, Annandale Road, Mill Street, Jutland, Phillip Kgosana Drive, Rhodes Drive, Union Avenue, Paradise Road, Edinburgh Drive, Simon van der Stel Freeway
M4	North–south	M59 (from District Six) – M60 – N2 (interchange) – M163 – N2 (interchange) – M18 – M89 – M92 – M63 – M33 – M24 – M9/M152 – M41 – M160 – M38 – M39 – M40 – M42 – M75 - R310 – M75 – M65 – M6 – M66 – M65 (Cape Point)	District Six, Woodstock, Salt River, Observatory, Mowbray, Rosebank, Rondebosch, Newlands, Claremont, Kenilworth, Wynberg, Plumstead, Diepriver, Bergvliet, Dreyersdal, Kirstenhof, Westlake, Lakeside, Muizenberg North, Muizenberg, St. James, Kalk Bay, Clovelly, Fish Hoek, Glencairn Heights, Glencairn, Bayview Heights, Mount Pleasant, Simon's Town, The Boulders, Winford, Beacons Way	Sir Lowry Road, Victoria Road, Main Road, Simonstown Road, Main Road
M5	North–south	N7 (interchange, near Dunoon) – M14 (start cosign) – M14 (end cosign) - M87 - M8 – N1 (interchange, start highway) – M16 (interchange) – N2 (interchange) – M52 (interchange) - M18 (interchange) – M34 (interchange) – M24 (interchange) – M9 (no intersection) – M68 – (interchange, end highway) – M38 – M55 – M35 -R310 (Costa da Gama)	Dunoon, Killarney Gardens, Milnerton Ridge, Milnerton, Rugby, Brooklyn, Maitland, Observatory, Mowbray, Sybrand Park, Athlone, Rondebosch East, Lansdowne, Plumstead, Parkwood, Southfield, Retreat, Cafda Village, Lavender Hill, Coniston Park, Marina da Gama, Costa da Gama	Malibongwe Drive, Potsdam Road, Koeberg Road, Black River Parkway, Kromboom Parkway, Prince George Drive
M6	East–west then south–north	M62 (Central) – M61 – M62 – M63 – Start Toll Road – End Toll Road – M64 – M65 – M4 (Glencairn Heights)	Central, Green Point, Three Anchor Bay, Sea Point, Bantry Bay, Clifton, Camps Bay, Bakoven, Llandudno, Hout Bay, Berg-en-dal, Scott Estate, Noordhoek, Crofters Valley, Sun Valley, Sunnydale, Capri, Glencairn Heights	Helen Suzman Blvd, Beach Road, Queens Road, Victoria Road, Main Road, Chapman's Peak Drive, Noordhoek Road, Ou Kaapseweg Extension, Glencairn Expressway
M7	North–south	N7/ N1 (interchange, Acacia Park) – M25 – R102 – M16 – N2 (interchange) – M18 – M24 - M9 (limited interchange) – M10 (interchange) -R300 – M181 – M46 – M10 – M177 - M32 – R310 (Rocklands)	Acacia Park, Tygerdal, Townsend Estate, Thornton, Epping Industrial, Bonteheuwel, Welcome, Vanguard, Surrey, Primrose Park, Sand Industria, Browns Farm, Philippi, Weltevreden Valley, Rondevlei Park, Westgate, Rocklands	Jakes Gerwel Drive, Weltevreden Road
M8	East–west	M14 (Kleinbosch) – M12 – N7 (interchange) – M87 - M5 (Milnerton)	Kleinbosch, Edgemead, Summer Greens, Century Gate, Sanddrift North, Tijgerhof, Milnerton	Bosmandam Road
M9	East–west	N2 / M165 (Firlands) – M149 – M153 – M168 – M156 – R102 – N2 (interchange) – R310 – M56 – M51 - M32 – M50 - M44 – M49 – R300 (no intersection) – M171 –M36 – M22 – M83 - M10 – M7 (no intersection) – M17 – M5 (no intersection) – M28 – M4 / M152 (Wynberg)	Firlands, Sir Lowry's Pass, Fernwood Estate, Rome Glen, van der Stel, Martinville, Somerset West Central, Briza Township, The Link, Griselda, Die Wingerd, Heldervue, Schoongelegen, Firgrove, Macassar, Umrhabulo Triangle, Mandela Park, Griffiths Mxenge, Eyethu, Nonqubela, Mxolisi Phetani, Ikwezi Park, Thembokwezi, Mandalay, Phillippi East, Philippi, Browns Farm, Schaap Kraal, Turf Hall, Wetton, Ottery, Wynberg	Sir Lowry's Pass Road, Main Road, Andries Pretorius Street, Upper Orange Street, Main Road, Macassar Road, Govan Mbeki Road, Wetton Road
M10	Northeast–southwest	R102 (Bellville Central) – M11 – M189 / M171 – M29 – M12 – M22 – M47 – N2 (interchange) – M18 – M24 - M9 – M7 (interchange) – M7 (Westgate)	Bellville Central, Bellville South, Greenlands, Belhar, Bishop Lavis, Nooitgedacht, Valhalla Park, Bonteheuvel, Heideveld, Manenberg, Schaap Kraal, West Gate	Robert Sobukwe Road, Duinefontein Road, Weltevreden Road
M11	East–west	M10 (Bellville Central) – M16 (Bellville Central)	Bellville Central	Tienie Meyer Road
M12	North–south then west / East	M13 (Burgundy Estate) - M14 – M8 – M26 – N1 (partial interchange) – M25 (start cosign) – M25 (end cosign) – R102 – M16 – M151 – M10 – M71 – M171 – M180 – R300 –M182 – M174 - R102 – R310 (near Stellenbosch)	Burgundy Estate, Kleinbosch, Welgelegen, Kaapzicht, Parow North, Churchill, Glenlilly, Parow, Beaconvale, Cravenby, Connaught, Eureka, Belhar, Highbury Park, Stellendale, Saxenburg Industrial Park	Siena Dr, Giel Basson Drive, Jan van Riebeeck Drive, 35th Avenue, Stellenbosch Road, Polkadraai Road
M13	East–west	M14 (Bothasig) – M12 – M31 – R302 (Durbanville Central)	Bothasig, Richwood, Nieuw Maastricht, Durbanville Central	Tygerberg Valley Road, Racecourse Road, Church Street
M14	Northwest–southeast	R27 / M19 (Melkbosstrand) - M120 - M187 - R27 – M5 (start cosign) – M5 (end cosign) – N7 (interchange) – M13 – M12 – M8 – M26 – N1 (interchange) – M25 – R102 (Parow)	Melkbosstrand, Big Bay, Bloubergstrand, Table View, Bothasig, Kleinbosch, Welgelegen, Plattekloof, Parow North, Clamhall, Churchill, Glenlily, Parow	Melkbosstrand Road, Otto du Plessis Drive, Blaauwberg Road, Koeberg Road, Plattekloof Road, McIntyre Road
M15	Northwest–southeast	R302 (Wellway Park) – M124 - M100 – M137 – M73 – N1 (interchange) – M25 – R101 – M23 (Botfontein SH)	Wellway Park, Langeberg Village, Sonstraal Heights, Zoo Park, Kraaifontein, Peerless Park East, Belmont Park, Wallacedene	Langeberg Road, Brighton Road, Van Riebeeck Street, Botfontein Street
M16	North–south then east–west	M31 (Kenridge) – N1 (interchange) – M25 – R102 – M11 – M29 – M12 – M76 – M47 – M7 – M17 – M52 – M5 (interchange, Maitland)	Kenridge, Door De Kraal, Welgemoed, Loevenstein, Vredelust, Klipkop, Ravensmead, Beaconvale, Avonwood, Elsiesrivier, Salberau, Epping Industrial, Pinelands, Ndabeni, Maitlands	Van Ribeeckshof Road, Jip de Jager Drive, Mike Pienaar Blvd, Francie van Zijl Drive, Avonwood Avenue, Viking Way, Jan Smuts Drive, Sunrise Circle, Berkley Road
M17	North–south	M16 (Epping Industrial) – N2 (interchange) – M18 – M34 – M24 – M9 – M68 – M55 – M35 - R310 (Strandfontein)	Epping Industrial, Hazendal, Athlone, Crawford, Lansdowne, Turf Hall Estate, Ottery East, Montagu's Gift, Lotus River, Pelikan Park, Strandfontein	Jan Smuts Drive, Strandfontein Road
M18	East–west	M4 (Mowbray) – M57 – M52 – M28 - M5 (interchange) – M17 – M7 – M10 – M47 – M22 / M83 (Nyanga)	Mowbray, Sybrand Park, Hazendal, Kewtown, Silvertown, Bridgetown, Surrey Estate, Vanguard, Heideveld, Guguletu, Nyanga	St Peters Road, Durban Road, Klipfontein Road
M19	East–west	R27 / M14 (Melkbosstrand) – N7 (Cape Farms)	Melkbosstrand	Melkbosstrand Road
M22	North–south	M10 (Valhalla Park) – Cape Town International Airport – N2 – M18 / M83 – M9 – R300 (no intersection) – M181 - M46 – M177 - M32 – R310 (Rocklands)	Valhalla Park, Airport Industria, Nyanga, Crossroads, Philippi, Heinz Park, New Woodlands, Woodlands, Westridge, Rocklands	Borcherds Quarry Road, New Eisleben Road, Eisleben Road
M23	East–west	R304 (Stellenbosch Farms) – M15 – M100 – R300 (no intersection) – M31	Annandale, Soneike, Morgen Gronde	Bottelary Road
M24	East–west	M10 (Mannenberg) - M7 (interchange) - M17 - M5 (interchange) – M28 – M57 - M4 (Claremont)	Claremont, Lansdowne, Pinati, Penlyn Estate, Primrose Park, Mannenberg	Turf Hall Road, Race Course Road, Doncaster Road, Chichester Road, Lansdowne Road, Stanhope Road
M25	East–west	M7 (Tygerdal) – M26 – M12 (start cosign) – M12 (end cosign) – M14 – M29 – M16 – M121 – R302 – M30 (start cosign) - M30 (end cosign) – M31 – R300 (no interchange) – M100 – M137 – M15 (Peerless Park)	Tygerdal, N1 City, Richmond Estate, Churchill, Clamhall, Fairfield, Avondale, Oostersee, Vredelust, Boston, Oakdale, Blomtuin, La Rochelle, Bellair, Hoogstede, Arauna, Morgenster Hoogte, Okavango Park, Scottsville, Peerless Park	Frans Conradie Drive, Giel Basson Drive, Frans Conradie Drive, Avondale Street, Mabel Street, Bill Bezuidenhout Drive, Suikerbos Street, Frans Conradie Drive
M26	East–west then north–south	M14 (Plattekloof) – M12 – N1 (interchange) – M25 – R102 (Vasco Estate)	Plattekloof, Welgelegen, Monte Vista, N1 City, Vasco Estate	Rothschild Blvd, Kroonenburg Sq, Monte Vista Blvd, Vasco Blvd
M28	North–south	M5 (interchange) / M18 (Mowbray) – M92 – M34 – M33 – M24 – M9 – M68 (Wynberg)	Mowbray, Rondebosch, Claremont, Kenilworth, Wynberg	Milner Road, Belvedere Road, Rosmead Road
M29	North–south	M25 (Avondale) – R102 – M16 – M10 – M71 (Belhar)	Avondale, Parow East, Klipkop, Ravensmead, Uitsig, Belhar	Tierberg Road, De la Rey Street, Akkerboom Street
M30	North–south	M121 (Bellville Park) – R302 – N1 (no interchange) – M25 (start cosign) – M25 (end cosign) - R101 – R102 (Sanlamhof)	Bellville Park, Bloemhof, Blomtuin, Oakdale, Hillrise, Sanlamhof	Bill Bezuidenhout Avenue
M31	North–south	M13 (Altydgedacht area) – M121 – R302 – M124 - N1 (interchange) – M25 – R101 – M23 – R102 (Shirley Park)	Kenridge, Ridgeworth, Stellenridge, La Rochelle, Bellair, Oak Glen, Kaymor, Shirley Park	Tygerbergvallei Road, Old Oak Road, Labelle Street
M32	North–south then east–west	M174 / M173 (Hillcrest Heights) – N2 (interchange) – M9 – M45 – M44 – M49 – M36 – M22 – M7 – M17 (Strandfontein)	Hillcrest Heights, Faure, Eyethu, Khaya, East Ridge, Portlands, Rocklands, Strandfontein	Spine Road
M33	East–west	M28 (Claremont) – M57 – M4 – M152 – M3 (Claremont)	Claremont	Keurboom Road, Camp Ground Road, Protea Road, Paradise Road
M34	East–west	M17 (Athlone) – M5 (interchange) – M28 (Rondebosch)	Athlone, Rondebosch East, Rondebosch	Kromboom Road
M35	East–west	M17 (Lotus River) – M5 (Grassy Park)	Lotus River, Grassy Park	5th Avenue
M36	North–south	M9 (Philippi East) – R300 (interchange) – M181 - M46 – M177 – M32 (Eastridge)	Philippi East, Lentegeur, Beacon Valley, Eastridge	Stock Road, AZ Berman Road
M38	East–west	M5 (Southfield) – M4 – M3 (interchange) – M42 (Belle Constantia)	Southfield, Dieprivier, Meadowridge, Belle Constantia	De Waal Road, Kendal Road
M39	Northwest–southeast	M41 (Constantia Vale) – M42 – M3 (interchange) – M4 (Retreat)	Constantia Vale, Gaylands, Meadowridge, Bergvliet, Retreat	Ladies Mile Road
M40	East–west	M4 (Kirstenhof) – M3 (interchange) – M42 (Tokai)	Kirstenhof, Tokai	Tokai Road
M41	East–west	M4 (Wynberg) – M160 – M155 – M3 (interchange) – M42 – M39 – M63 (near Hout Bay)	Wynberg, Alphen, Constantia Vale, Silverhurst, Witteboomen	Constantia Main Road
M42	North–south then east–west	M41 (Alphen) – M38 – M39 – M40 – M64 – M3 (interchange) – M4 (Kirstenhof)	Alpen, Belle Constantia, Airlie, Fir Grove, Forest Glade, Tokai, Westlake Estate, Kirstenhof	Spaanschemat River Road, Orpen Road, Steenberg Road
M44	North–south then east–west	M49 (near Driftsands) – N2 (interchange) – M9 – M50 – M32 – M51 – M56 – R310 (Enkanini)	Mxolisi Phetani, Bongani, Victoria Mxenge, Kaya, Ilitha Park, Harare, Kuyasa, Enkanini	Mew Way
M45	North–south then east–west	M9 (Nonqubela) – M50 - M32 – M51 – M56 – R310 (Enkanini)	Nonqubela, Eyethu, Graceland, Mandela Park, Umrhabulo Triangle, Enkanini	Bonga Drive, Lwandle Road, Walter Sisulu Road
M46	East–west	M49 (Beacon Valley) – M36 – M22 – M7 (Westgate)	Beacon Valley, Lentegeur, Woodlands, Westgate	Morgenster Road
M47	North–south	M16 (Epping Industrial) – M151 - M10 – M18 (Guguletu)	Epping Industrial, Kalksteenfontein, Valhalla Park, Charlesville, Guguletu	Valhalla Drive, Steve Biko Drive
M48	East–west	N7 (near Cape Farms) – M58 (Skilpadvlei)	Durbanvale, Skilpadvlei	Vissershok Road
M49	East–west then north–south	R310 (Eersterivier Suid) – M32 – M44 – N2 (no interchange) – M9 – M181 – M46 – M32 – M51 - R310 (near Monwabisi)	Eersterivier Suid, Electric City, Faure, Mfuleni, Mxolisi Phetani, Thembokwezi, Lentegeur, Beacon Valley, Eastridge, Lost City	Old Faure Road, Swartklip Road,
M50	East–west	M9 (Nonqubela) – M45 – M44 (Victoria Mxenge)	Nonqubela, Victoria Mxenge	Pama Road
M51	East–west	M9 (Griffiths Mxenge) – M45 – M44 – M49 (Lost City)	Griffiths Mxenge, Ilitha Park, Lost City	Steve Biko Road
M52	East–west	M18 (Mowbray) – M5 (interchange) – N2 (interchange) – M16 (Pinelands)	Mowbray, Pinelands	Raapenberg Road, Forest Drive
M54	East–west	M171 (Delft) – M180 – R300 (interchange) – M174 (Sunset Glen)	Delft, Voorbrug, Diepwater, Fairdale, Fountain Village, Sunset Glen	Hindle Road
M55	East–west	M5 (Grassy Park) – M17 (Montagu's Gift)	Grassy Park, Montagu's Gift	Klip Road
M56	North–south	M9 (Mandela Park) – M45 – M44 – R310 (Monwabisi)	Mandela Park, Kuyasa, Monwabisi	Oscar Mpetha Road
M57	North–south	R102 (Salt River) – M163 – N2 (interchange) – M18 – M92 – M33 – M24 (Claremont)	Salt River, Observatory, Mowbray, Rosebank, Rondebosch, Claremont	Albert Road, Malta Road, Liesbeeck Parkway, Palmyra Road
M58	North–south	R304 (Cape Farms) – M48 - R302 (Durbanville Central)	Durbanville Central, Skilpadvlei, Nerina, Durbanvale	Adderley Road, Koeberg Road
M59	North–south	R102 (Foreshore) – M4 – M3 (Gardens)	Foreshore, District Six, Gardens	Buitenkant Street
M60	North–south	N2 (Foreshore) – R102 – M4- M3 (District Six)	Foreshore, District Six	Christiaan Barnard Street, Tennant Street, De Villiers Street, Roeland Street
M61	East–west	M62 (Central) – M6 (Sea Point)	Central, Green Point, Three Anchor Bay, Sea Point	Somerset Road, Main Road, Regent Street
M62	Northeast–southwest	N2 (Central) – M6 – M61 – M3 – M6 (Camps Bay)	Central, Gardens, Camps Bay	Buitengracht Street, Kloof Nek Street, Camps Bay Drive
M63	Northeast–southwest	M4 (Rondebosch) – M146 – M3 – M41 – M6 (Berg-en-Dal)	Rondebosch, Newlands, Bishopscourt, Klassenbosch, Bel Ombre, Witteboomen, Hout Bay, Imizamo Yethu, Berg-en-Dal	Klipper Road, Newlands Avenue, Rhodes Drive, Hout Bay Road
M64	Northeast–southwest	M42 (Westlake Estate) – M6 (Sunnydale)	Westlake Estate, Stonehurst, Silvermine Village, Crofters Valley, Sunnydale	Ou Kaapse Weg
M65	East–west then northeast–southwest	M4 (Fish Hoek) – M6 – M82 – M82 – M66 – M4 (near Cape Point)	Fish Hoek, Risi View, Sun Valley, Sunnydale, Fairie Knowe, Masiphumelele, Heron Park, Imhoff's Gift, Ocean View, Kommetjie, Scarborough	Kommetjie Road, Main Road, Plateau Road
M66	Northeast–southwest	M4 (Bayview Heights) – M65 (near Scarborough)	Bayview Heights, Redhill	Red Hill Road
M68	East–west	M28 (Wynberg) – M5 (interchange) – M17 (Ottery East)	Wynberg, Royal Cape, Ottery, Ottery East	Ottery Road, New Ottery Road
M71	East–west (Semi Circle)	M12 / M180 (Belhar) – M171 – M29 – M12 (Belhar)	Belhar	Belhar Drive, Erica Drive
M73	East–west	R302 (Durbell) – M124 - M100 – M137 – M15 (Kraaifontein)	Durbell, Everglen, Eversdal, Bethanie, Amanda Glen, Vredekloof, Vredekloof East, Kraaifontein	Eversdal Road, De Bron Road, Marlborough Street, Darwin Road
M75	North–south	M4 (Lakeside) – M4 (Kalk Bay)	Lakeside, Muizenberg North, Muizenberg, St James, Kalk Bay	Boyes Drive
M76	Northeast–southwest	M16 (Elsiesrivier) – M151 (Connaught)	Elsiesrivier, Balvenie	Halt Road
M82	North–south	M65 (Ocean View) – M65 (near Ocean View)	Ocean View	Slangkop Road
M83	North–south	M18 / M22 (Nyanga) – M9 (Nyanga)	Nyanga	Ntlangano Cr, Great Dutch Road, Sithandatu Avenue, Emms Drive
M87	North–south	M5 (Marconi Beam) - M8 - N1?	Marconi Beam, Joe Slovo Park, Sanddrift, Century City?	Omuramba Road, Ratanga Road?, Sable Road?
M89	East–west	M3 (from Rosebank) – M4 (Rosebank)	Rosebank	Woolsack Road
M92	East–west	M4 (Rondebosch) – M57 – M28 (Rondebosch)	Rondebosch	Belmont Road, Park Road
M96	North–south	M3 (Gardens) – Oranjezicht	Gardens, Oranjezicht	Upper Orange Street
M100	North–south	R302 (The Crest) – M15 – M73 – N1 (interchange) – M25 – R101 – M23 (Annandale)	The Crest, Uitzicht, Pinehurst, Sonstraal Heights, Vredekloof, Bracken Heights, Hoogstede, Ferndale, Brackenfell Industrial, Sonkring, Burgundy, Annandale	Brackenfell Blvd
M120	East–west	R27 (near Sunningdale) – M14 (Big Bay)	Big Bay	Big Bay Blvd
M121	North–south	M31 (Kenridge) – M30 – N1 (no interchange) – M25(Oakdale)	Kenridge, Oakdale	Carl Cronje Drive
M124	North–south	M15 (Langeberg Village) – M73 – M31 (Stellenridge)	Langeberg Village, Sonstraal, Amanda Glen, Stellenryk, Silverstream, East Rock, Glen Ive, Stellenridge	Fairtrees Road, Eversdal Way
M137	North–south	M15 (near Zoo Park) – M73 – N1 (interchange) – M25 – R101 (Brackenfell Industrial)	Langeberg Ridge, Morgenster Hoogte, Morgenster, Brackenfell Industrial	Okavango Road
M146	East–west	M3 (Rondebosch, interchange) – M63 (Rondebosch)	Rondebosch	Princess Anne Avenue
M149	Northeast–southwest	M9 (Somerset West Central) – N2 – R44 (near Langgewacht)	Somerset West Central, Garden Village, Helderzicht, Victoria Park	Victoria Street
M151	East–west	M12 (Connaught) – M76 – M47 (Epping Industrial)	Connaught, Balvenie, Clarkes, Matroosfontein, Epping Industrial	Owen Road
M152	North–south	M33 (Claremont) – M4 / M9 (Kenilworth)	Claremont, Kenilworth	Newlands Road, Tennant Street, Riverstone Road
M153	Northeast–southwest	M9 (van der Stel) – N2 (interchange) – R44 (Rome)	van der Stel, Somerset Park, Longlands, Rome	Main Road
M155	North–south	M3 (Wynberg, interchange) – M41 (Wynberg)	Wynberg	Trovato Link, Waterloo Road, Bower Road
M156	West / East then north–south	M9 (Firgrove) – R44 – M168 (Parel Vallei)	Firgrove, Eldawn, Helena Heights, Briza Township, Parel Vallei	Winery Road, Steynsrust Road, Harewood Avenue, Irene Avenue
M160	Northwest–southeast	M41 (Plumstead) – M4 (Plumstead)	Plumstead	Gabriel Road
M161	Northeast–southwest	N2 (Broadlands Industrial) – R44 (Gustrow)	Broadlands Industrial, Tarentaalplaas, Casablanca, Gustrow	Broadlands Road
M163	East–west	M4 (Observatory) – M57 (Observatory)	Observatory	Station Road
M165	Northeast–southwest	N2 / M9 (Firlands) – R44 (Gordon's Bay Central)	Mansfield Park, Temperance Town, Mountainside, Gordon's Bay Central	Sir Lowry's Pass Road
M167	North–south	N1 (Kraaifontein Industry) – R101 (Belmont Park)	Kraaifontein Industry, Belmont Park	Maroela Road
M168	East–west	Lourensford Estate – M156 – M9 (Somerset West Central)	Erinvale, Land-en-Zeezicht, Parel Vallei, Somerset West Central	Lourensford Road
M171	North–south	M10 / M189 (Greenlands) – M71 – M12 – M54 – M180 – N2 (no interchange) – M9 (Philippi East)	Greenlands, Belhar, Delft, Delft South, Philippi East	Symphony Way
M173	East–west	M32 / M174 (Hillcrest Heights) – R102 (Rosedale)	Hillcrest Heights, Forest Heights, Forest Glade, Rosedale	Forest Drive
M174	North–south	M12 (Blackheath Industria) – M54 – M32 / M173 (Hillcrest Heights)	Blackheath Industrial, Sunset Glen, Malibu Village, Hillcrest Heights	Range Road, Wimbledon Road, Buttskop Road, Eersriv Way
M175	East–west	Zevenwacht Estate – R102 (Klipdam)	Zevendal, Jacarandas, Mikro Park, Klipdam	Langverwacht Road
M176	North–south	N2 (Woodstock, interchange) – R102 (Woodstock)	Woodstock	Lower Church Street
M177	East–west	M36 (Beacon Valley) – M22 – M7 (Westgate)	Beacon Valley, Portlands, Westridge, Westgate	Wespoort Drive
M180	North–south	M12 / M171 (Belhar) – M54 – M171 (Delft South)	Belhar, Roosendaal, Voorbrug, Eindhoven, Delft South	Delft Main Road
M181	East–west	M49 (Lentegeur) – M36 – M22 – M7 (Rondevlei Park)	Lentegeur, New Woodlands, Colorado, Rondevlei Park	Highlands Drive
M182	North–south	R102 (Kuilsrivier) – M12 (Highbury Park)	Kuilsrivier, Oakdene, Highbury, Highbury Park	Nooiensfontein Drive
M187	Northwest–southeast	M14 (Table View) - R27 (Dolphin Beac)	Table View, Dolphin Beach	Marine Drive
M189	North–south then east–west	R102 (Labiance) – M10 / M180 (Greenlands)	Labiance, Bellville South Industrial, Sacks Circle Industrial, Greenlands	Peter Barlow Road, Modderdam Road

== See also ==
- Numbered routes in South Africa
