= Thornton, Cape Town =

Thornton Thorntonite
- Street map of Thornton

- Location within Western Cape Location within South Africa
- Coordinates: 33°55′25″S 18°32′07″E
- Country: South Africa
- Province: Western Cape
- Municipality: City of Cape Town
- Main Place: Pinelands

Government
  - Councillor: Brian Watkyns (DA)

Area
  - Total: 1.89 km^{2} (0.73 sq mi)

Population (2011)
  - Total: 4,707
  - Density: 2,490/km^{2} (6,450/sq mi)

Racial makeup (2011)
  - Black African: 23.9%
  - Coloured: 49.0%
  - Indian/Asian: 3.7%
  - White: 20.4%
  - Other: 3.0%

First languages (2011)
  - English: 72.4%
  - Afrikaans: 12.1%
  - Xhosa: 8.0%
  - Tswana: 1.1%
  - Other: 6.5%
- Time zone: UTC+2 (SAST)
- Postal code (street): 7460
- PO box: 7485
- Area code: 021

Thornton is a suburb of Cape Town, South Africa. Thornton is situated only 10 kilometres (6 mi) east of the city centre, adjacent to Pinelands. Like Pinelands, Thornton is a mainly residential suburb with an abundance of trees. It is bordered by the Elsieskraal River, Pinelands, Viking Way, and the M7 Jakes Gerwel Drive. Many of the streets in Thornton are named after Viking themes, such as Thor Circle, Odin Drive and Viking Way. Others are named after trees, such as Poplar Avenue and Sipres Avenue.

== Demographics ==
According to the 2011 Census, Thornton has a population of 5,862 people, with 94% of the labour force (aged 15 to 64) being employed. The predominant language spoken in Thornton is English.

== Geography ==
Thornton, like Pinelands, is in the Southern Suburbs of Cape Town, sitting close to the border delineating the Northern and Southern Suburbs. There are many trees lining the roads of Thornton, and there are green spaces with wild flowers.

== Education ==
The College of Cape Town has a Thornton Campus, primarily for Civil Engineering and Mechanical Engineering.

There is also the Thornton Primary School, which was founded in 1954. Thornton Primary School caters for grade 1 to grade 7. In 1966 the school hall was built.

The SOS Children's Village of Cape Town was established in Thornton in 1994. The SOS in Thornton has facilities for approximately 100 orphaned or abandoned children.

== Sports ==
The Santos Sports Fields are in Thornton. There are also children's play parks within Thornton, which have swings and slides for children.

== Amenities ==
There are two shopping centres in Thornton, including two convenience stores and shops such as a locksmith, barber, food shops, a pet shop and an electronics store.

There are also churches in Thornton, including the N.G. Kerk Thornton, Methodist church, Apostolic church and Grace Church. The Clothing Bank is in Thornton and was founded in 2010, working primarily with unemployed mothers. Northlink college and Thornton Primary school
