= Summer Greens =

Neighbourhood in Cape Town, South Africa

- Interactive map of Summer Greens
- Coordinates: 33°52′59″S 18°31′32″E
- Country: South Africa
- Province: Western Cape
- Municipality: City of Cape Town

Area
  - Total: 0.79 km^{2} (0.31 sq mi)

Population (2011)
  - Total: 6,275
  - Density: 7,900/km^{2} (21,000/sq mi)

Racial makeup (2011)
  - African: 53%
  - Coloured (khoe): 29%
  - White: 11%
  - Other: 6%

First languages (2011)
  - English: 41%
  - Afrikaans: 14%
  - Xhosa: 20%
  - Other: 16%
- Time zone: UTC+2 (SAST)
- Postal code (street): 7441
- PO box: 7407

Summer Greens is a neighbourhood in Cape Town. According to the 2011 census, Summer Greens has population of 6,275. Illegal buildings and crime are major challenges in the area.

Neighbouring suburbs include Milnerton Ridge, Milnerton, Edgemead, Bothasig and Montague Gardens.
