= Strandfontein, Cape Town =

Seaside suburb of Cape Town, in Western Cape, South Africa

Strandfontein The Village
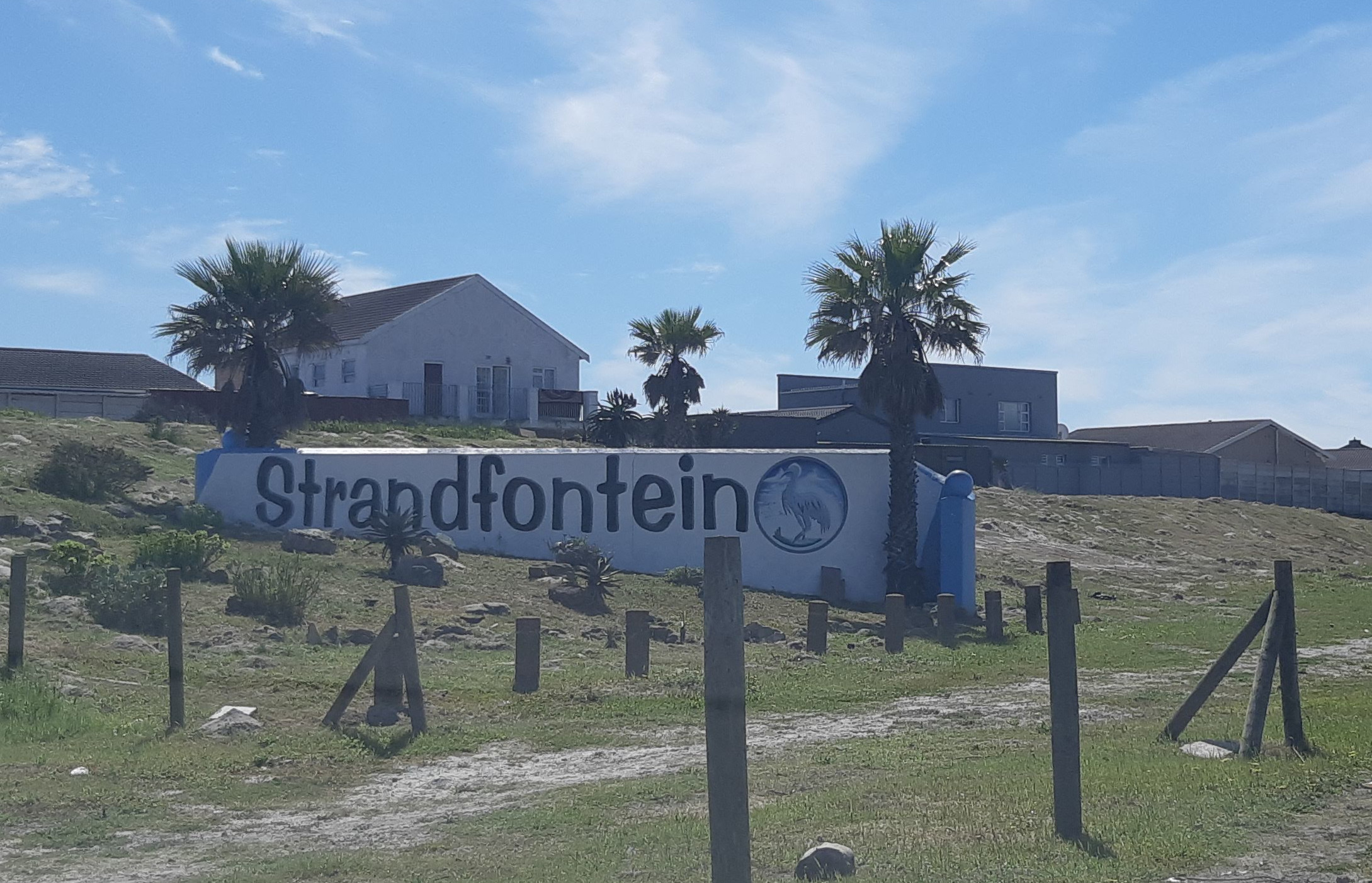

- Location within Western Cape Location within South Africa Location within Africa
- Coordinates: 34.076°S 18.573°E
- Country: South Africa
- Province: Western Cape
- Municipality: City of Cape Town
- Main Place: Cape Town

Area
  - Total: 8.22 km^{2} (3.17 sq mi)

Population (2011)
  - Total: 758
  - Density: 92.2/km^{2} (239/sq mi)

Racial makeup (2011)
  - Black African: 7.7%
  - Coloured: 88.4%
  - White: 1.6%
  - Other: 2.4%

First languages (2011)
  - Afrikaans: 69.5%
  - English: 21.9%
  - Xhosa: 4.7%
  - Other: 4.0%
- Time zone: UTC+2 (SAST)
- Postal code (street): 7798
- PO box: 7788

Strandfontein is a seaside resort 8 km east of Muizenberg and just west of Michells Plain, on the northern shore of False Bay in the City of Cape Town municipality in the Western Cape province of South Africa.

It was laid out in 1962. The name is Afrikaans for 'beach fountain'.

== 9 miles Surfing Club ==
During the Apartheid, only white surfers were allowed to use Muizenberg beach, the coloured surfers were chased off the beach. They then had to walk nine miles from there to Strandfontein Pavilion where they could enjoy surfing and where they started the 9 Miles Surfing Club Project.

== Homeless camp during COVID-19 Lockdown ==
The beach town is best known as the location of the camp where the City of Cape Town interned homeless people for over a month during the COVID-19 pandemic lockdown. It has been controversial because of claims that the City forced people into these camps and because of the lack of physical distancing and the failure of the camp to address the basic needs of people held at the camp. Its existence has also been heavily criticised by independent monitors linked to the South African Human Rights Commission.
