= Macassar, Western Cape =

Suburb of the City of Cape Town, Western Cape, South Africa

Macassar
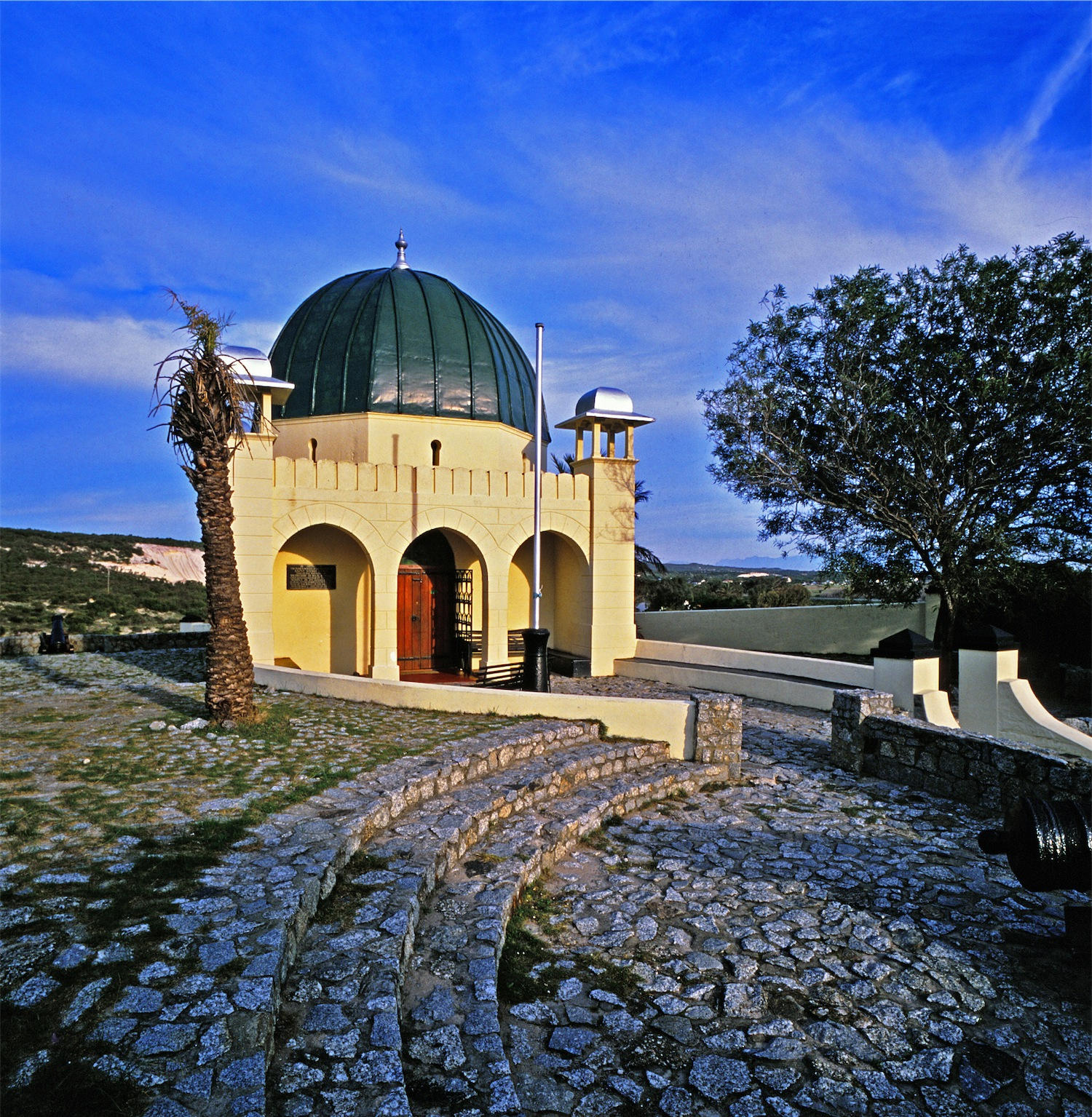
- Sheikh Yusuf's tomb in Macassar

- Location within Western Cape Location within South Africa
- Coordinates: 34°04′S 18°46′E
- Country: South Africa
- Province: Western Cape
- Municipality: City of Cape Town

Area
  - Total: 28.85 km^{2} (11.14 sq mi)
- Elevation: 4 m (13 ft)

Population (2011)
  - Total: 33,225
  - Density: 1,152/km^{2} (2,983/sq mi)

Racial makeup (2011)
  - Black African: 8.9%
  - Coloured: 88.3%
  - Indian/Asian: 0.5%
  - White: 1.2%
  - Other: 1.1%

First languages (2011)
  - Afrikaans: 85.2%
  - English: 7.5%
  - Xhosa: 5.0%
  - Other: 2.4%
- Time zone: UTC+2 (SAST)
- Postal code (street): 7130
- PO box: 7134

Macassar is a small town in South Africa, close to Strand and Somerset West, with an approximate population of 33,225. Administratively it is under City of Cape Town Eastern Suburbs zone.

Macassar’s history is closely tied to the Strand, whose inhabitants first settled this area. The kramat (shrine) of Sheikh Yusuf (Tuanta Salamaka) of the Sultanate of Gowa, in present-day Makassar in Indonesia, is a holy place to South Africa's Muslim community. The Sheikh, who was exiled by the Dutch in 1694, came to the Strand area and made it his final resting place; although his followers, who were mainly fishermen, found the sea of Macassar rather uninviting and moved further along the coast to Strand’s Mosterds Bay. After Yusuf died, his followers named the area after his birthplace, spelling it with "c" in place of "k".

The Macassar Dunes Conservation Area forms part of the vital coastal dune system, one of the biodiversity hotspots of the Western Cape. These dunes have been impacted by conflicting activities such as cattle grazing and 4X4 vehicle use.

Macassar is a predominantly Coloured community close to the Macassar Dunes, whose workers historically are in the fishing and boatmaking industry.

== Education ==
- Macassar Primary
- Macassar Secondary
- Marvin Park Primary
- Oklahomastreet Primary
- False Bay Primary
- Zandvliet High School

== List of Suburbs ==
- Bell Glen
- Brandwacht
- Chris Hani Park
- Deaconsville
- Deep Freeze
- Macassar Village
- Macassar Heights
- Marvin Park
- New Macassar
- New Scheme
- Riverside
- Ruben Road
- Smartie Town

== Other Locations ==
- Boys Town Macassar
- Macassar Beach Pavilion (derelict)
- Macassar CDC Clinic
- Macassar Fire Department
- Macassar Municipal Offices
- Macassar New Hall
- Macassar New Sports Ground
- Macassar Old Sports Ground
- Macassar Police Station
- Macassar Public Library
- Macassar Waste Water Treatment Works
- Rheinmettal Denel Munition Factory
- Sheikh Yusuf's Kramat

== See also ==
- Macassar Village Land Occupation
