= Belhar =

Suburb of the City of Cape Town, South Africa, on the Northern suburbs

- Location within Western Cape Location within South Africa
- Coordinates: 33°57′S 18°38′E
- Country: South Africa
- Province: Western Cape
- Municipality: City of Cape Town

Area
  - Total: 8.17 km^{2} (3.15 sq mi)

Population (2011)
  - Total: 56,234
  - Density: 6,880/km^{2} (17,800/sq mi)

Racial makeup (2011)
  - Black African: 4.9%
  - Coloured: 90.2%
  - Indian/Asian: 1.0%
  - White: 0.3%
  - Other: 3.7%

First languages (2011)
  - Afrikaans: 64.5%
  - English: 31.4%
  - Xhosa: 1.2%
  - Other: 3.0%
- Time zone: UTC+2 (SAST)
- Postal code (street): 7493
- PO box: 7507

Belhar is a small town in the Western Cape, South Africa and forms part of the Tygerberg area in the City of Cape Town. It is known for being the place where the Belhar Confession was formulated.
