= Western Cape Department of Transport and Public Works =

Department overview
- Formed: 1994
- Jurisdiction: Government of the Western Cape
- Headquarters: 9 Dorp Street, Cape Town; 33°55′26″S 18°25′00″E
- Employees: 2,309
- Annual budget: R7,426,579,000
- Minister responsible: Bonginkosi Madikizela, Provincial Minister of Transport and Public Works
- Department executive: Jacqui Gooch, Head of Department
- Website: www.westerncape.gov.za/tpw

The Western Cape Department of Transport and Public Works is a department of the Government of the Western Cape. It is responsible for the development of the transport system in the Western Cape province of South Africa, and for constructing and maintaining buildings and other structures for the other departments of the provincial government.

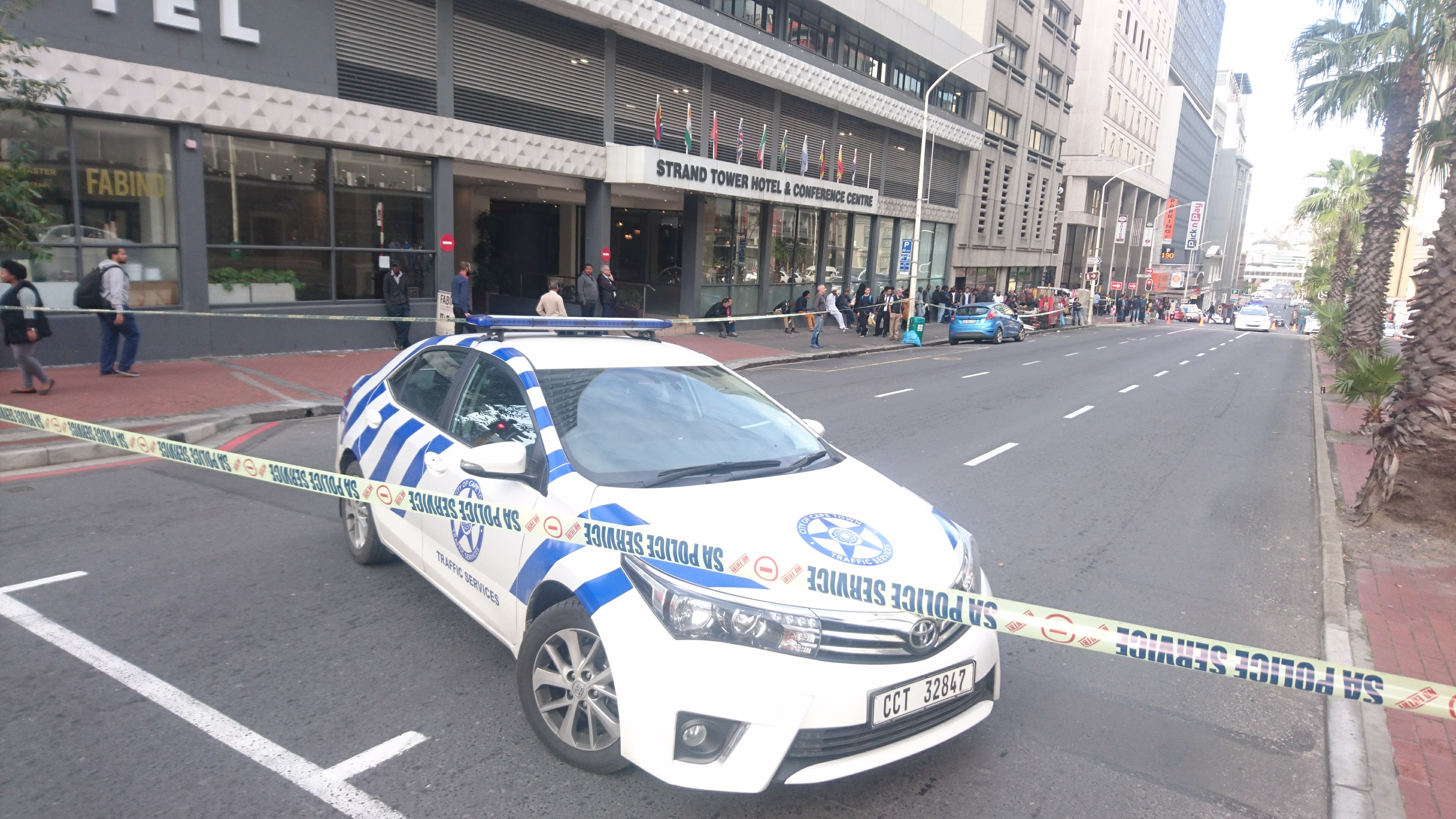
A City of Cape Town Traffic Services vehicle. Municipal Traffic Departments fall within the Department of Transport

The political leader of the department is the Provincial Minister of Transport and Public Works, this is Bonginkosi Madikizela of the Democratic Alliance. The administrative head is the Superintendent-General of Transport and Public Works, this is Jacqui Gooch.

In the 2017/18 financial year, the department had 2,309 employees and a budget of R7,426,579,000.

== See also ==
- Government of the Western Cape
- Department of Transport (South Africa)
- Department of Public Works (South Africa)
