= Woodstock railway station (Cape Town) =

Metrorail train station in Cape Town

Woodstock
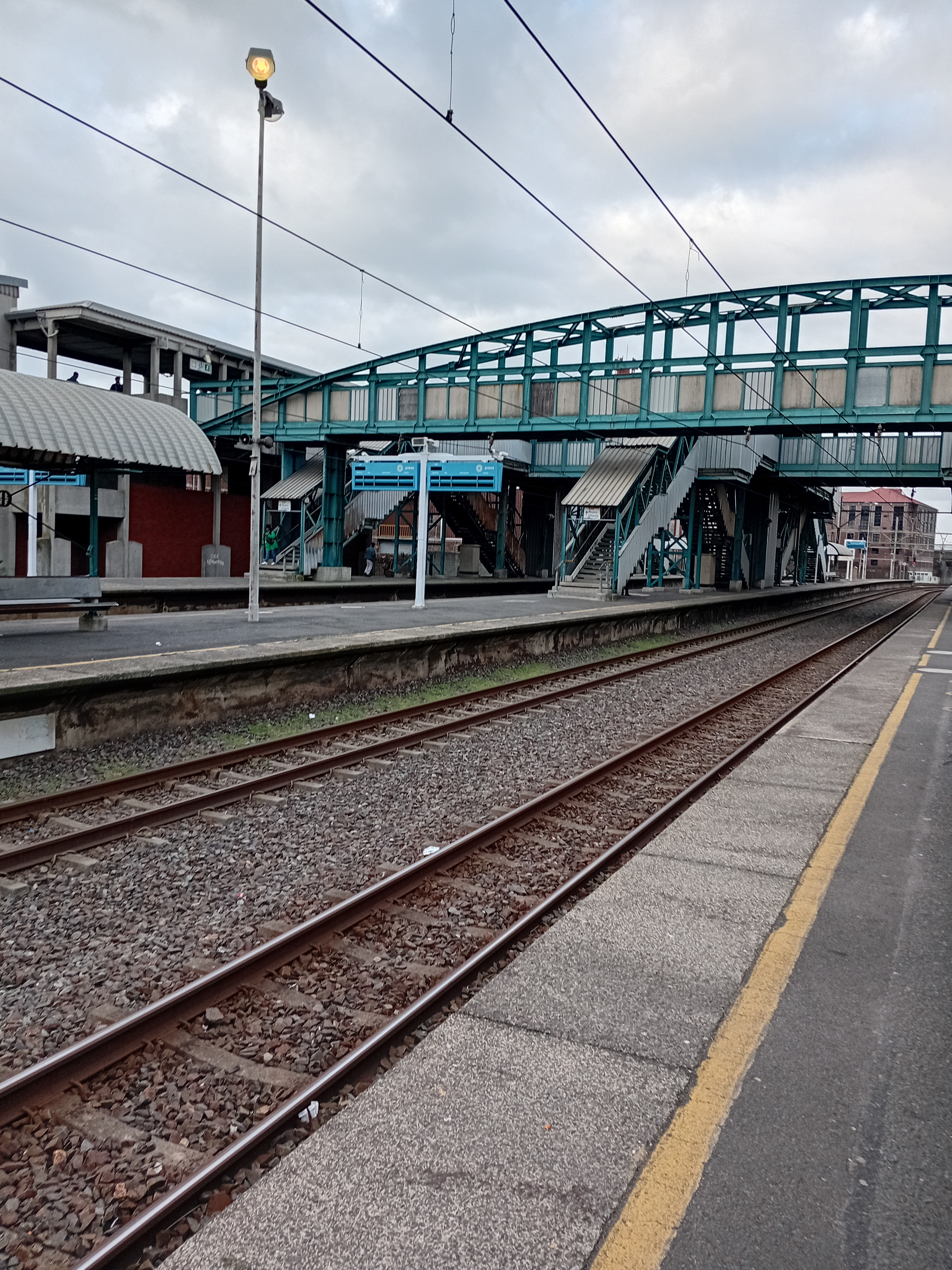
- The pedestrian bridge at Woodstock station in August 2026

General information
- Location: Grey Street, Woodstock 7925, Cape Town; South Africa
- Coordinates: 33°55′31″S 18°26′46″E
- System: Metrorail station
- Owner: PRASA
- Line: Northern Line Central Line Cape Flats Line Southern Line
- Platforms: 3 island platforms
- Tracks: 6

Construction
- Structure type: Elevated
Location
- Location within Cape Town Location within South Africa

Woodstock railway station is a Metrorail railway station in Woodstock, Cape Town. It is the first station after the Cape Town terminus on the old main line to Bellville. Services on all of Metrorail's lines pass through the station.

The station building, located between Porter Street to the north and Grey Street to the south, is elevated above the six tracks that pass through. The station has three island platforms, each serving a pair of tracks.

== Services ==
Preceding station	Metrorail Western Cape	Following station
Cape Town Terminus	Northern Line services via Mutual	Salt River towards Wellington, Muldersvlei or Strand
Cape Town Terminus	Central Line services via Pinelands	Salt River towards Kapteinsklip, Chris Hani or Bellville
Cape Town Terminus	Cape Flats Line	Salt River towards Retreat
Cape Town Terminus	Southern Line	Salt River towards Simon's Town
