= Pinelands railway station =

Metrorail station on the Cape Flats Line and the Central Line

Pinelands

General information
- Location: Alexandra Way, Pinelands 7405, Cape Town; South Africa
- Coordinates: 33°56′22″S 18°29′26″E
- System: Metrorail commuter rail station
- Line: Cape Flats Line Central Line
- Platforms: 2 island platforms
- Tracks: 4

Construction
- Structure type: Elevated
Location
- Location within Cape Town Location within South Africa

Pinelands railway station is a Metrorail station situated on the western edge of Pinelands, a suburb of Cape Town, South Africa.

It is served by trains on the Cape Flats Line and the Central Line. Cape Flats Line trains travel from Cape Town through Pinelands and Athlone to Retreat. Central Line trains travel from Cape Town through Pinelands and Langa to Mitchell's Plain, Khayelitsha and Bellville.

The station has four tracks accessible through two island platforms. The station building is elevated above the tracks and platforms. A parking lot is situated on the eastern side of the tracks.

== History ==
In 2020, the body of a dead teenager was found near the station next to the tracks.

== Services ==
| Preceding station | Metrorail Western Cape | Following station |
|---|---|---|
| Ndabeni towards Cape Town | Central Line services via Pinelands | Langa towards Kapteinsklip, Chris Hani or Bellville |
| Ndabeni towards Cape Town | Cape Flats Line | Hazendal towards Retreat |
