= Salt River railway station =

Metrorail railway station in Salt River, Cape Town

Salt River
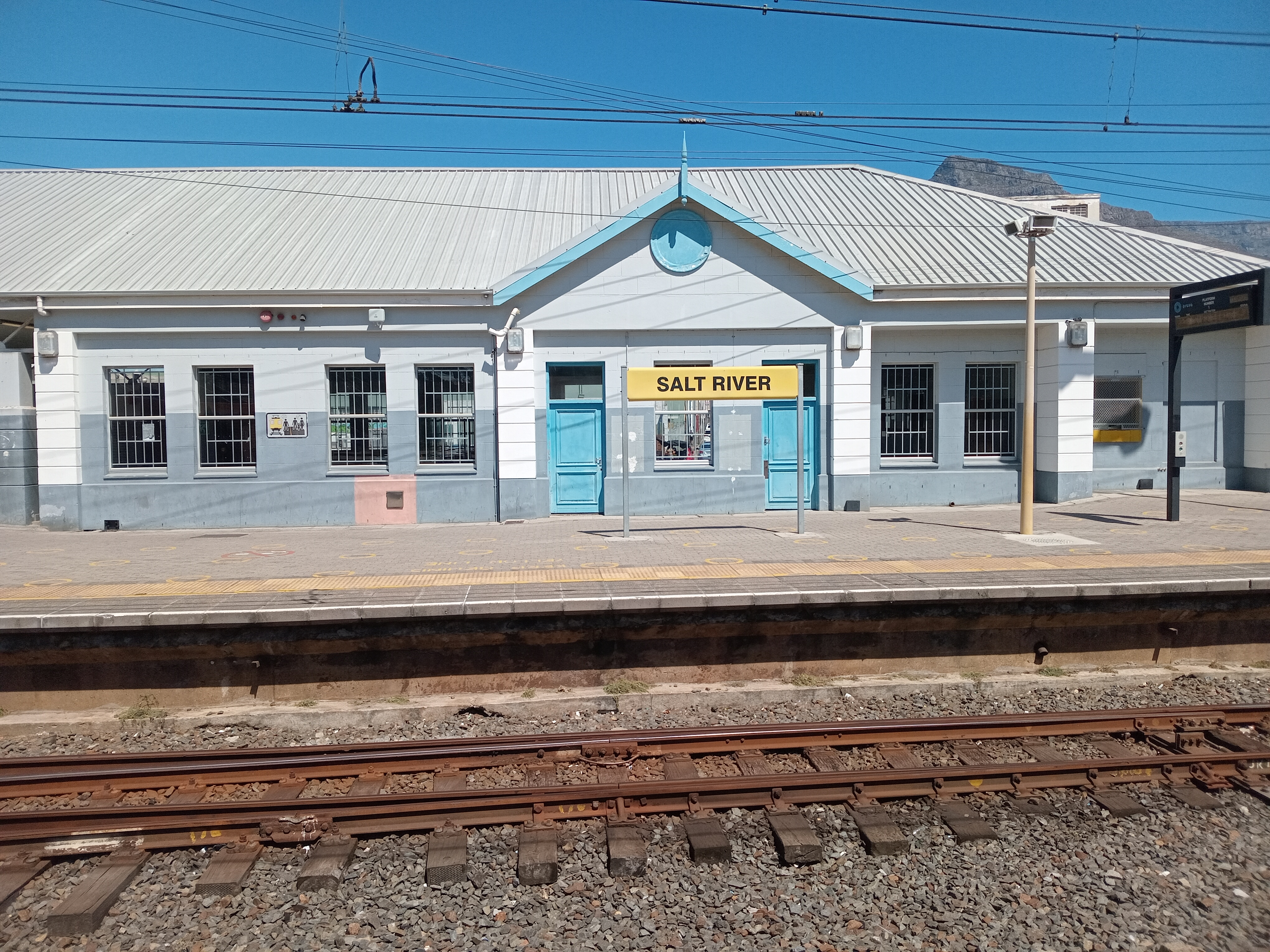
- The station in March 2026

General information
- Location: Foundry Road, Salt River 7925, Cape Town; South Africa
- Coordinates: 33°55′38″S 18°27′55″E
- System: Metrorail station
- Owner: PRASA
- Line: Northern Line Central Line Cape Flats Line Southern Line
- Platforms: 3 islands, 1 side
- Tracks: 7

Construction
- Structure type: Elevated
Location
- Location within Cape Town Location within South Africa

Salt River railway station is a Metrorail railway station in Salt River, Cape Town. It is the second station from the Cape Town terminus on the old main line to Bellville, and the junction where the Southern Line branches from the main line. Services on all of Metrorail's lines pass through the station.

The station has three island platforms and one side platform, serving a total of seven tracks. The station building is located on Foundry Street to the south of the tracks.

In 2019, cables were stolen nearby the station causing significant delays for passengers.

== Services ==
Preceding station	Metrorail Western Cape	Following station
Woodstock towards Cape Town	Northern Line services via Mutual	Koeberg Road towards Wellington, Muldersvlei or Strand
Woodstock towards Cape Town	Central Line services via Pinelands	Koeberg Road towards Kapteinsklip, Chris Hani or Bellville
Woodstock towards Cape Town	Cape Flats Line	Koeberg Road towards Retreat
Woodstock towards Cape Town	Southern Line	Observatory towards Simon's Town
