= Mutual railway station =

Railway station in Cape Town, South Africa

Mutual

General information
- Location: Mutual Way, Pinelands 7405, Cape Town; South Africa
- Coordinates: 33°55′18″S 18°30′53″E
- System: Metrorail station
- Owner: PRASA
- Line: Northern Line Central Line
- Platforms: 1 side, 1 island, 1 island containing a bay
- Tracks: 6

Construction
- Structure type: At-grade
Route map
Location
- Location within Cape Town Location within South Africa

Mutual railway station is a Metrorail commuter rail station located between the suburbs of Maitland and Pinelands in Cape Town, South Africa. It is situated next to the South African headquarters of the Old Mutual, from which it takes its name. Mutual is a particularly busy station because it is the junction at which the Central Line towards Mitchell's Plain and Khayelitsha diverges from the Northern Line main line to Bellville.

The station is divided into two parts, connected by a platform-to-platform bridge. To the north there is a side platform and an island platform, serving three tracks of the Northern Line; to the south, an island platform containing a single bay, serving three tracks of the Central Line. There is a station building on either side of the tracks.

In 2023, a passenger was awarded damages after he was hit by a rock and fractured his skull while alighting a train at Mutual station.

== Notable places nearby ==
- Old Mutual South African headquarters
- Maitland Cemetery
- Pinelands Jewish Cemetery
- Conradie Hospital
- College of Cape Town Pinelands campus

== Services ==
Preceding station	Metrorail Western Cape	Following station
Woltemade towards Cape Town	Northern Line services via Mutual	Thornton towards Wellington, Muldersvlei or Strand
Ysterplaat towards Cape Town	Central Line services via Mutual	Langa towards Kapteinsklip, Chris Hani or Bellville
