= Mowbray railway station =

Metrorail station on the Southern Line

Mowbray
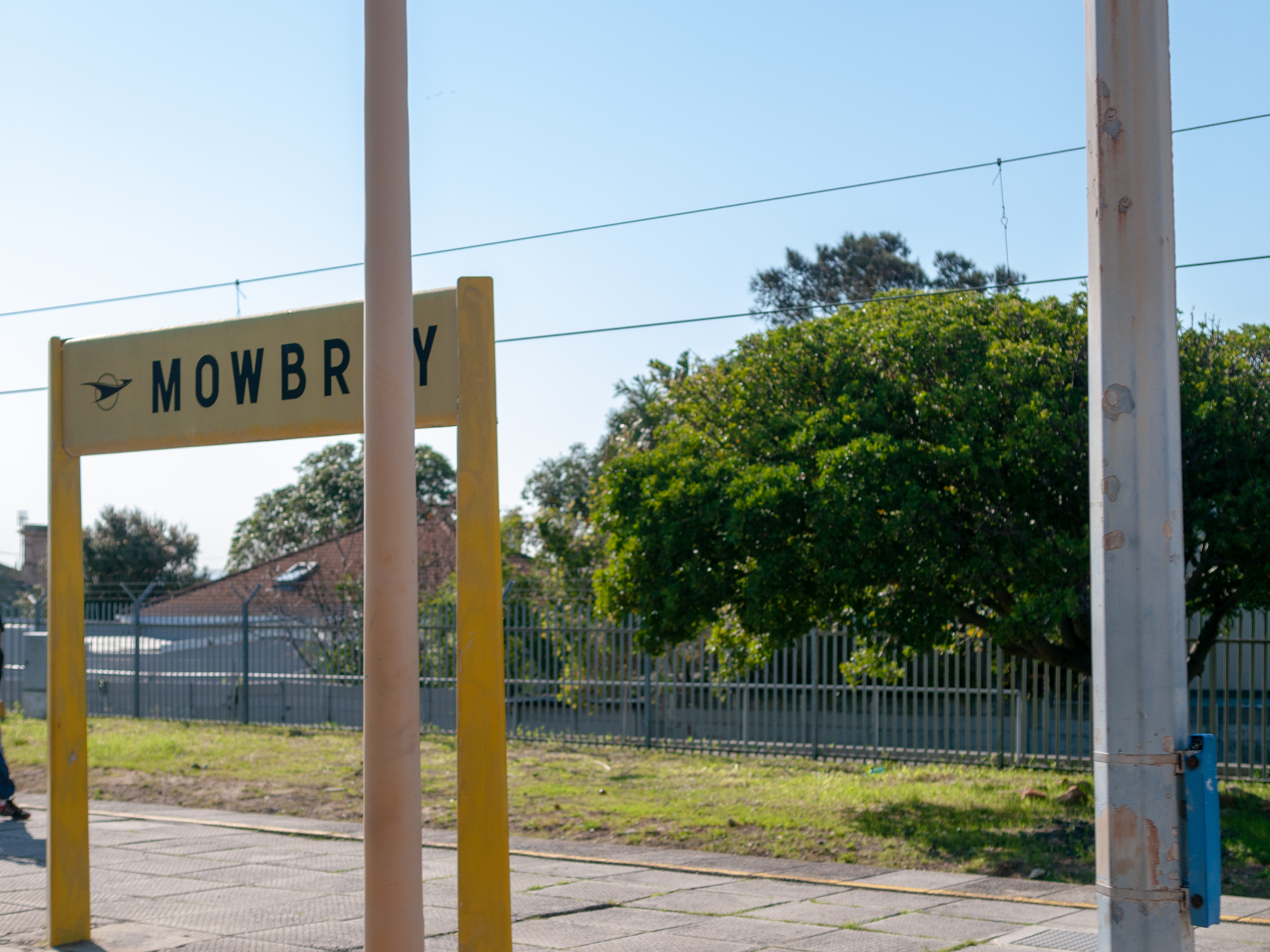
- Mowbray station sign in July 2018

General information
- Location: Station Road, Mowbray 7700, Cape Town; South Africa
- Coordinates: 33°56′48″S 18°28′26″E
- System: Metrorail station
- Owner: PRASA
- Line: Southern Line
- Platforms: 1 side platform, 1 island
- Tracks: 3
- Connections: Golden Arrow Bus Services; Minibus taxis UCT Jammie Shuttle

Construction
- Structure type: At-grade

Services
Preceding station	Metrorail Western Cape	Following station
Observatory towards Cape Town	Southern Line	Rosebank towards Simon's Town
Location
- Location within Cape Town Location within South Africa

Mowbray railway station is a Metrorail station on the Southern Line, serving the suburb of Mowbray in Cape Town.

The station has three tracks, served by a side platform and an island platform; the station building is at ground level on the western side of the tracks. Adjacent to the station is a major bus station of the Golden Arrow Bus Services and a large minibus taxi rank; Mowbray is the western end of the Klipfontein Road transport corridor to the Cape Flats.

== Notable places nearby ==
- University of Cape Town
- Cape Peninsula University of Technology Mowbray campus

== See also ==
- Cape Government Railways
- Metrorail Western Cape
- Passenger Rail Agency of South Africa
- Southern Suburbs, Cape Town
