= Century City railway station =

Metrorail train station on the Northern Line (Cape Town)

Century City
- Alstom X'Trapolis Mega arriving at the station en route to Cape Town station in October 2026

General information
- Location: Century City, Cape Town, 7441; South Africa
- Coordinates: 33°54′05″S 18°30′41″E
- System: Metrorail station
- Owner: PRASA
- Line: Northern Line
- Platforms: 2 side platforms
- Tracks: 2

Construction
- Structure type: Elevated

History
- Opened: 8 June 2010

Services
Preceding station	Metrorail Western Cape	Following station
Kentemade towards Cape Town	Northern Line	Akasia Park towards Wellington, Muldersvlei or Strand
Location

The Century City railway station is a Metrorail train station serving the suburb of Century City in Cape Town, South Africa. It is served by trains on the Northern Line.

== History ==
The station was built in the lead-up to the 2010 FIFA World Cup (Cape Town being a host city) to address the lack of direct rail access to Century City. Construction began in 2009 and cost R59 million. The station was opened on 8 June 2010 by the Minister of Transport S'bu Ndebele, the Western Cape Minister of Public Works Robin Carlisle and the PRASA CEO Lucky Montana. Hundreds of thousands people used the train station during the World Cup between June and July 2010.

Six women were murdered and their bodies were found in the undeveloped land between the Century City and Akasia Park train stations in 2014.

An adjacent MyCiTi Public Transport Interchange was constructed next to the railway station between 2013 and 2015. The system officially opened on 1 August 2015.

In January 2020, a train was set on fire between Century City and Kentemade stations, reducing Cape Town's fleet from 33 to 32.

In August 2025, the Cape Argus reported that residents and the Kensington Factreton Residents and Ratepayers Association have described the station as a "dream deferred", citing that highlighted that it had become a crime hotspot and that the station's infrastructure had become neglected.

== Design ==
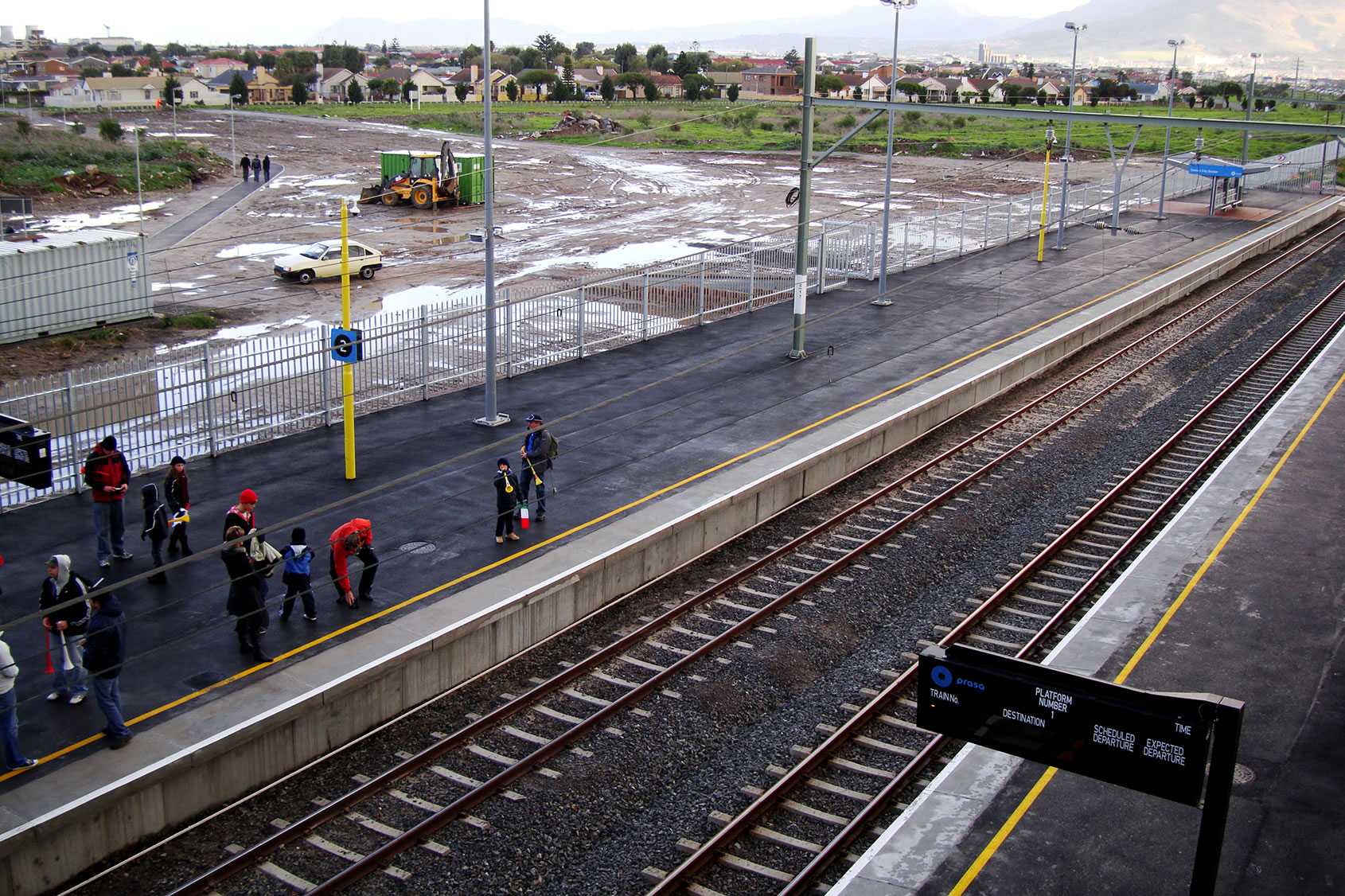
Commuters waiting for a train on a station platform in June 2010

The station is an elevated structure constructed above the Northern Line. It has two side platforms, one for each direction of travel. Unlike older stations that have enclosed subways, the station has an overhead concourse.

The station was built in line with a contemporary architectural style. It has an electronic board showing the times of the next trains and exit barriers that are similar to those used in stations on the London Underground.

== Notable places nearby ==
- The Century City development, including:
  - Canal Walk, a shopping centre
- Ratanga Park
