= Muizenberg railway station =

Railway station in Muizenberg, Cape Town

Muizenberg
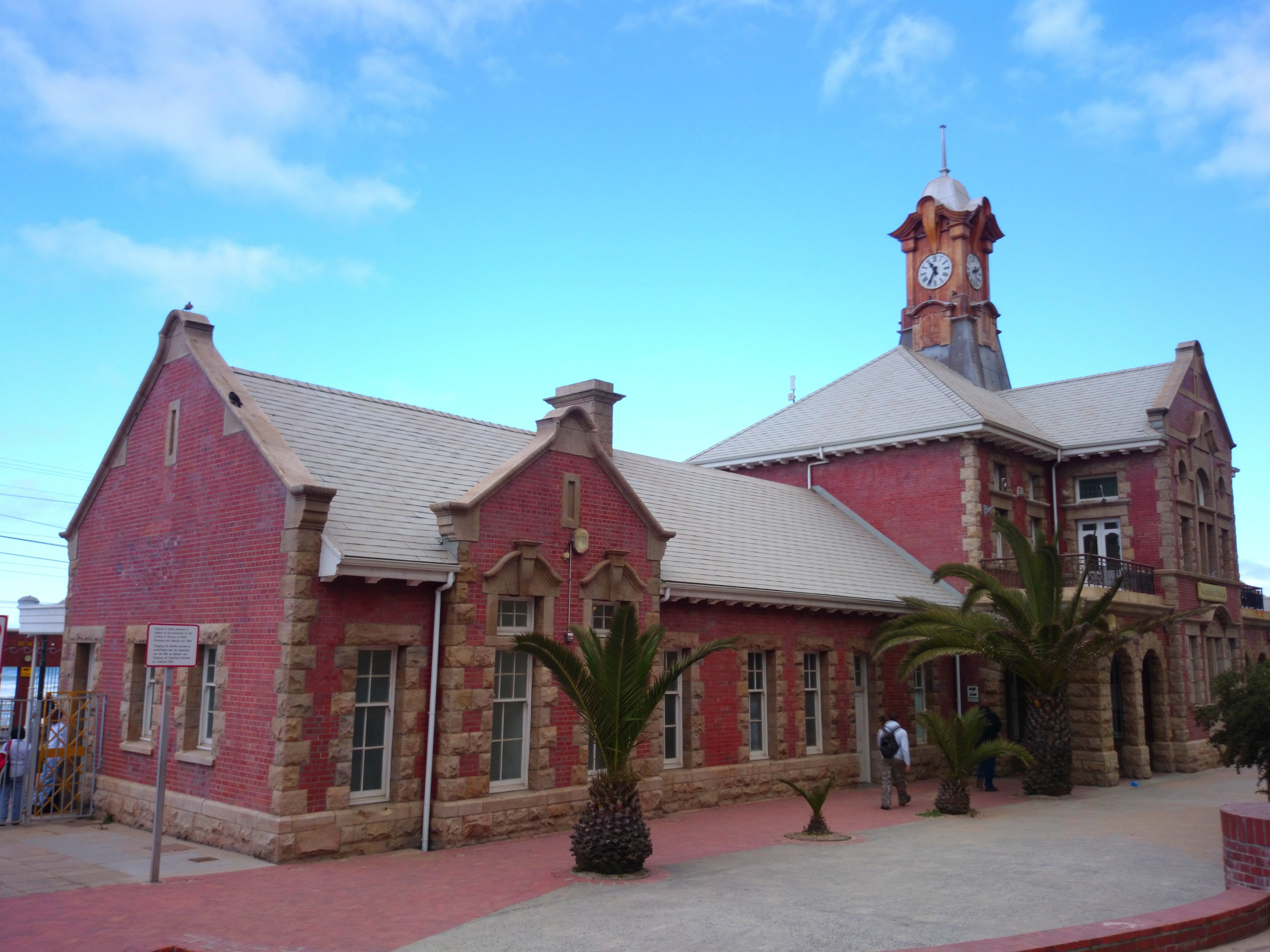
- The station in 2014

General information
- Location: Main Road, Muizenberg, Cape Town, South Africa, 7950
- Coordinates: 34°6′34″S 18°28′4″E
- System: Metrorail station
- Owner: PRASA
- Line: Southern Line
- Platforms: 2 side platforms
- Tracks: 2

Construction
- Structure type: At-grade

Services
Preceding station	Metrorail Western Cape	Following station
False Bay towards Cape Town	Southern Line	St. James towards Simon's Town
Location

The Muizenberg railway station is a Metrorail train station located on the False Bay Coast serving the suburb of Muizenberg in Cape Town, South Africa. The station is served by trains running on the Southern Line.

== History ==
The railway line from Wynberg reached Muizenberg in 1882, as part of Cecil John Rhodes's railway plans for Cape Town. The line was direct from Park Station in Johannesburg through to Muizenberg via a loop at Salt River station. The station was built between 1911 and 1913 by W Delbridge and officially opened on 7 June 1913 by the Minister of Railways and Harbours, Henry Burton.

In 1982, the station was designated as a National Monument under the previous National Monument Act of 1969. It is currently classed as a Grade I site under the National Heritage Resources Act 25 of 1999.

On 8 October 2015, a train was set alight and three carriages were damaged by the fire. Three teenagers were arrested in connection to the fire.

== Design ==
The building was designed in an Edwardian architectural style by architect JC Tully, a pupil of Sir Herbert Baker. The station features a clock tower overlooking the Muizenberg beachfront. Architectural author Dr Hans Fransen wrote the following about the station: "Impressive, festive two-storeyed building with single-storey wings, in unplastered brick and dressed quarry stone for trimmings, quoining, window surrounds, gables. Timber turret. Entirely unrelated to the standard railway-station style and more like a town hall (which Muizenberg never had)."

Building stone was quarried at Elsies Peak in Fish Hoek, while dressed stone was obtained from Kalk Bay. There is a circular steel staircase located inside the station.

Two cannons stand on the platform overlooking the False Bay Coast, commemorating the Battle of Muizenberg, which was fought in the area in 1795. The cannons were cleaned and repainted by the Muizenberg Historical Conservation Society during a youth project in 2017.

== Gallery ==
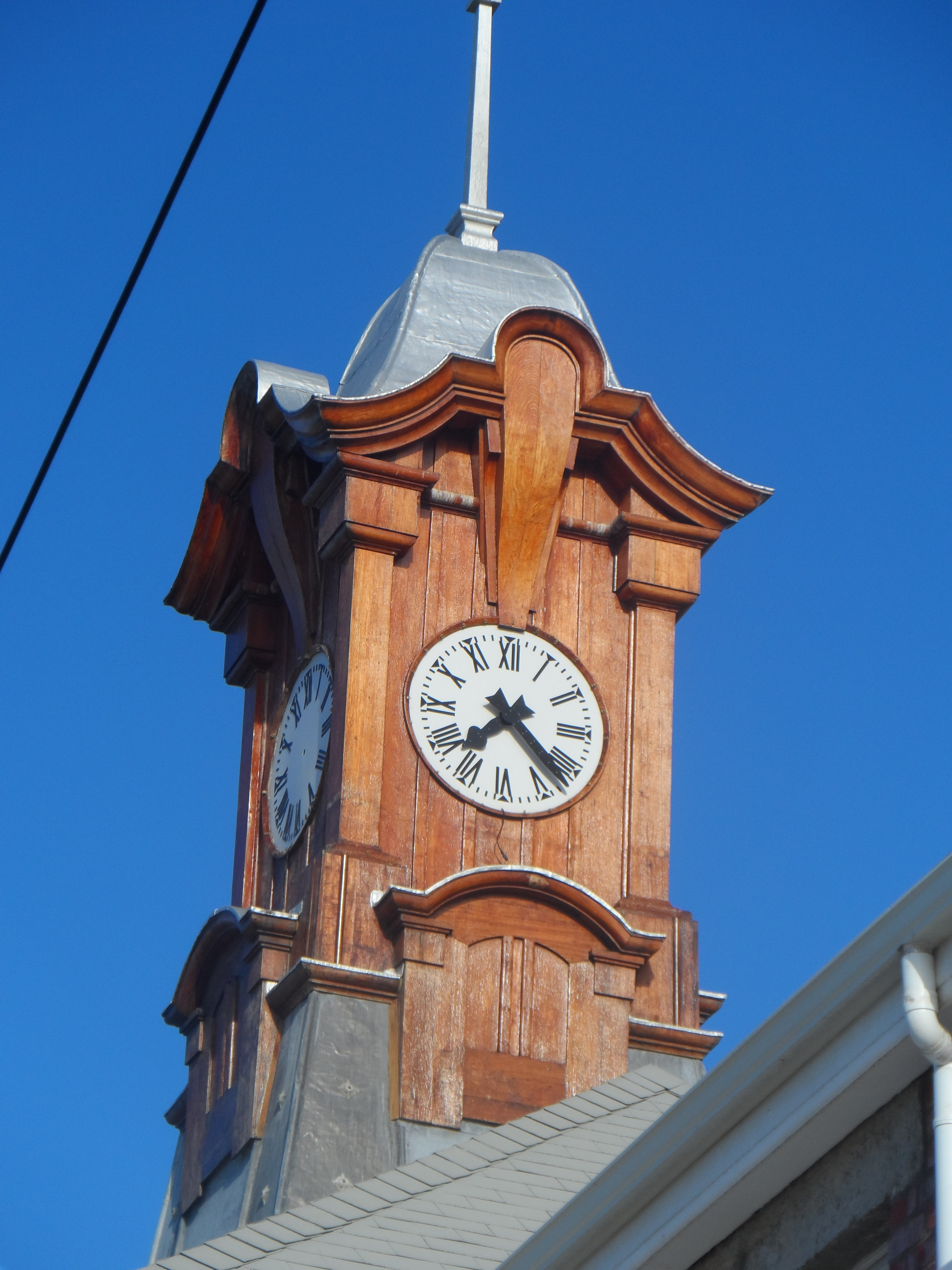
The Clock Tower in 2013

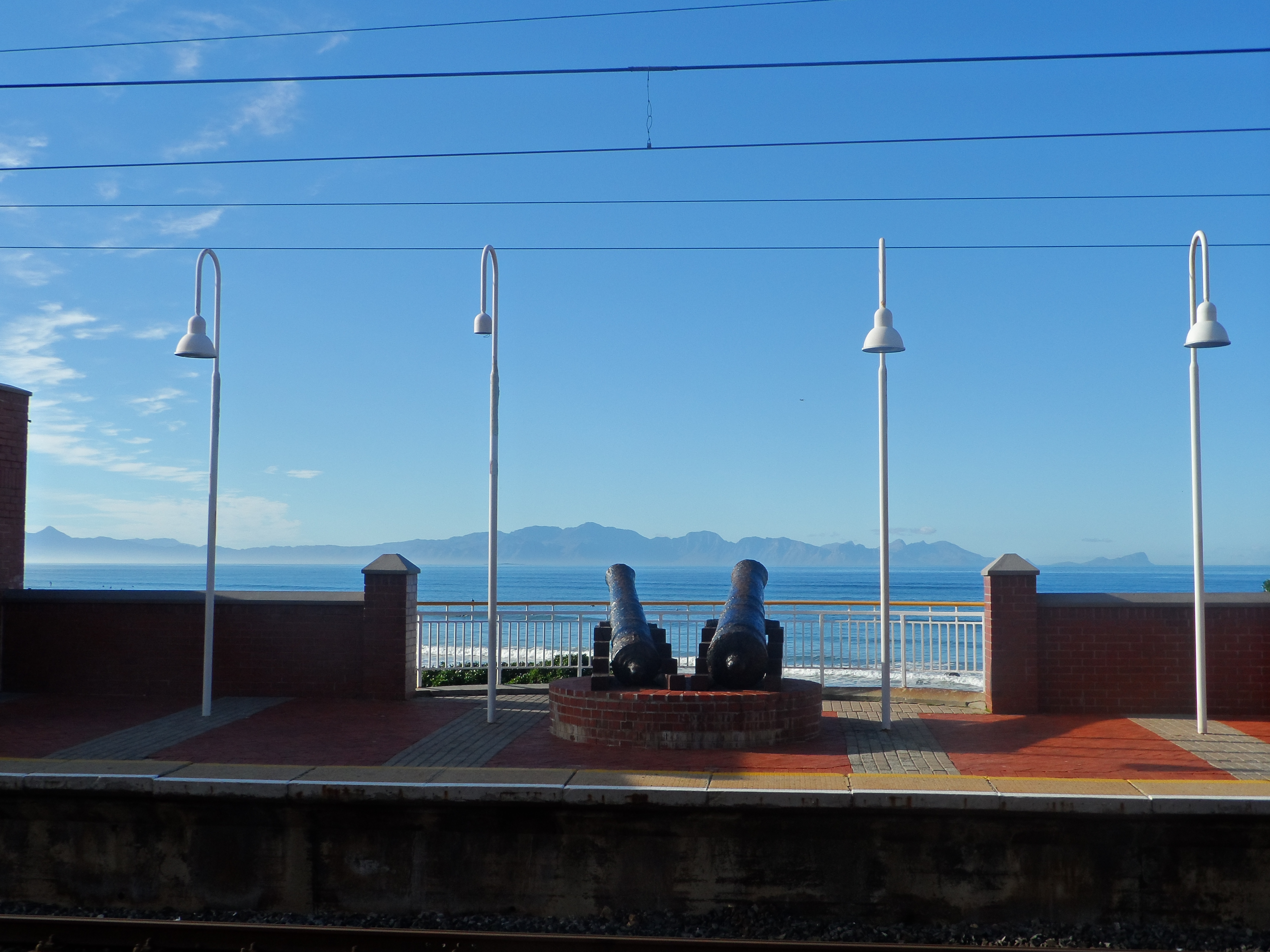
Two cannons overlooking the beachfront

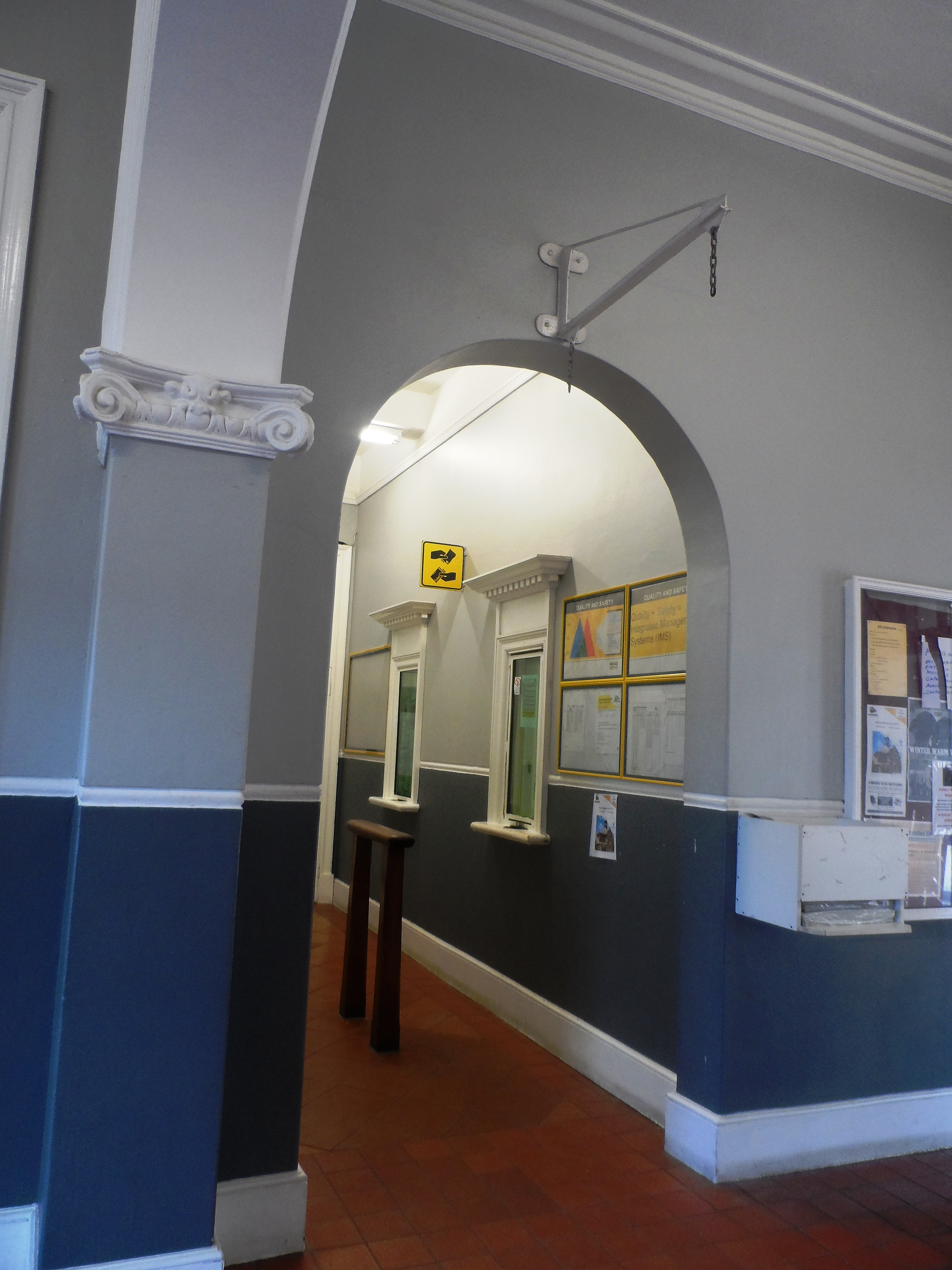
The ticket office

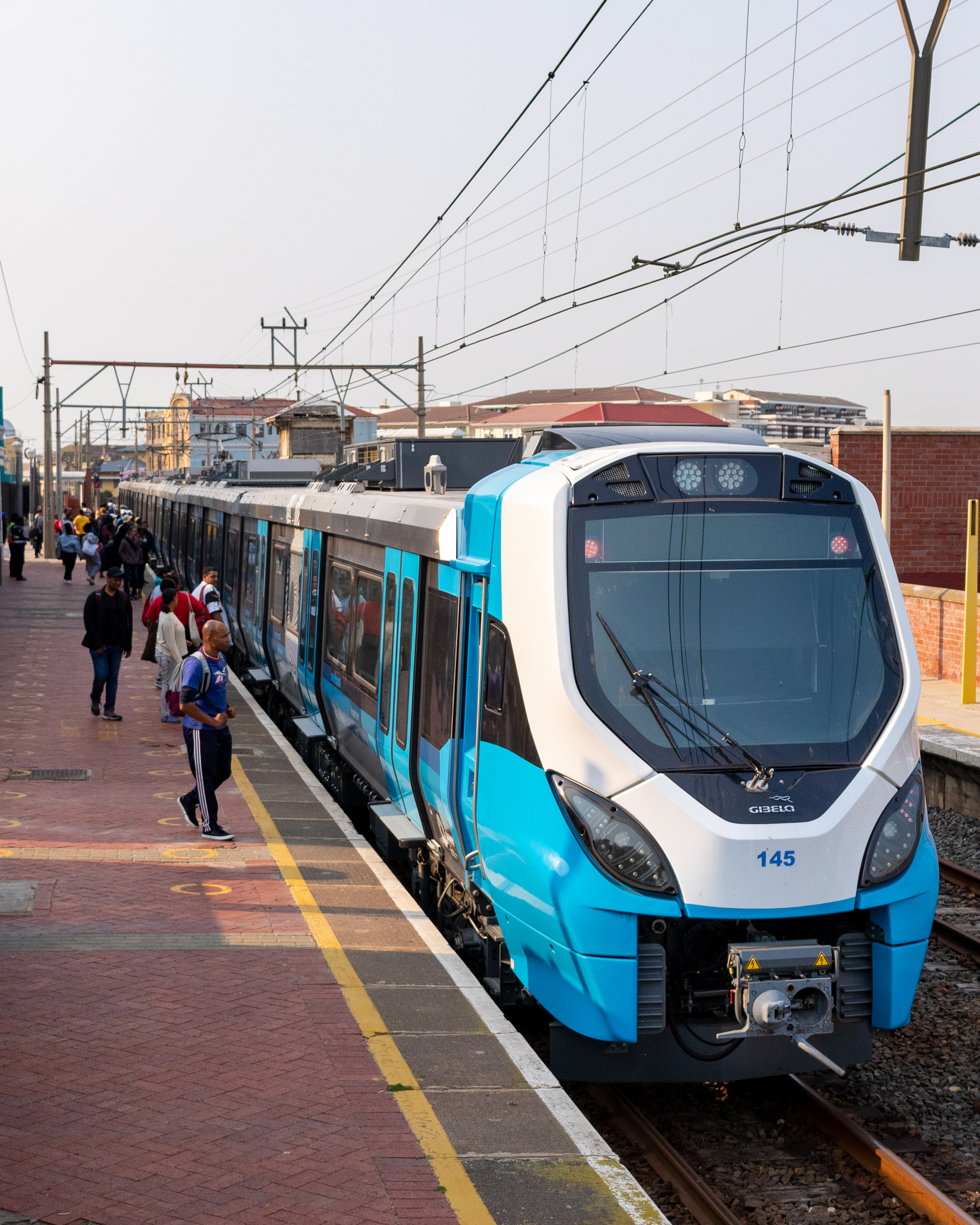
An Alstom X'Trapolis Mega train at the station

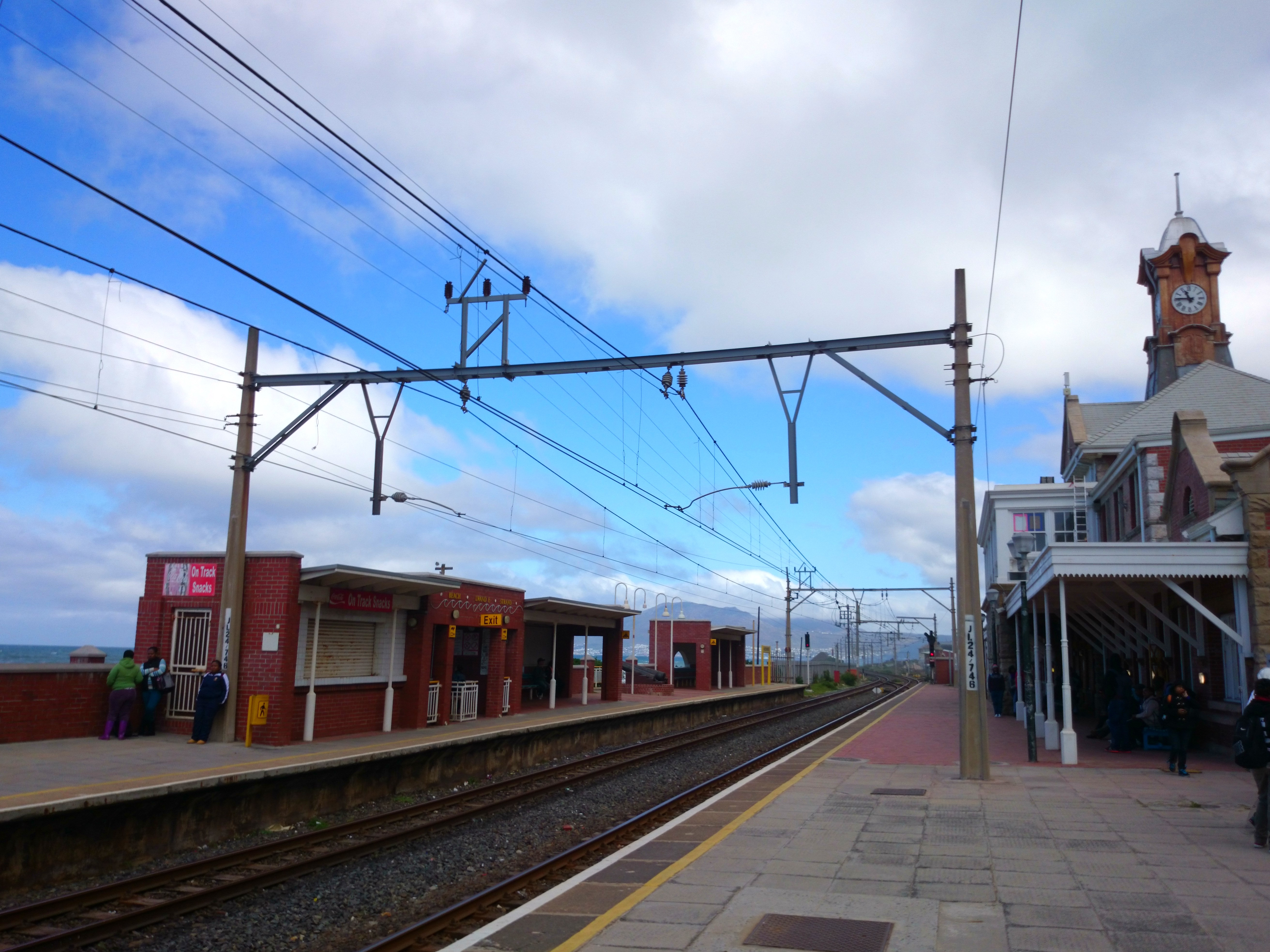
The railway tracks
