= Observatory railway station =

Metrorail station on the Southern Line

Observatory
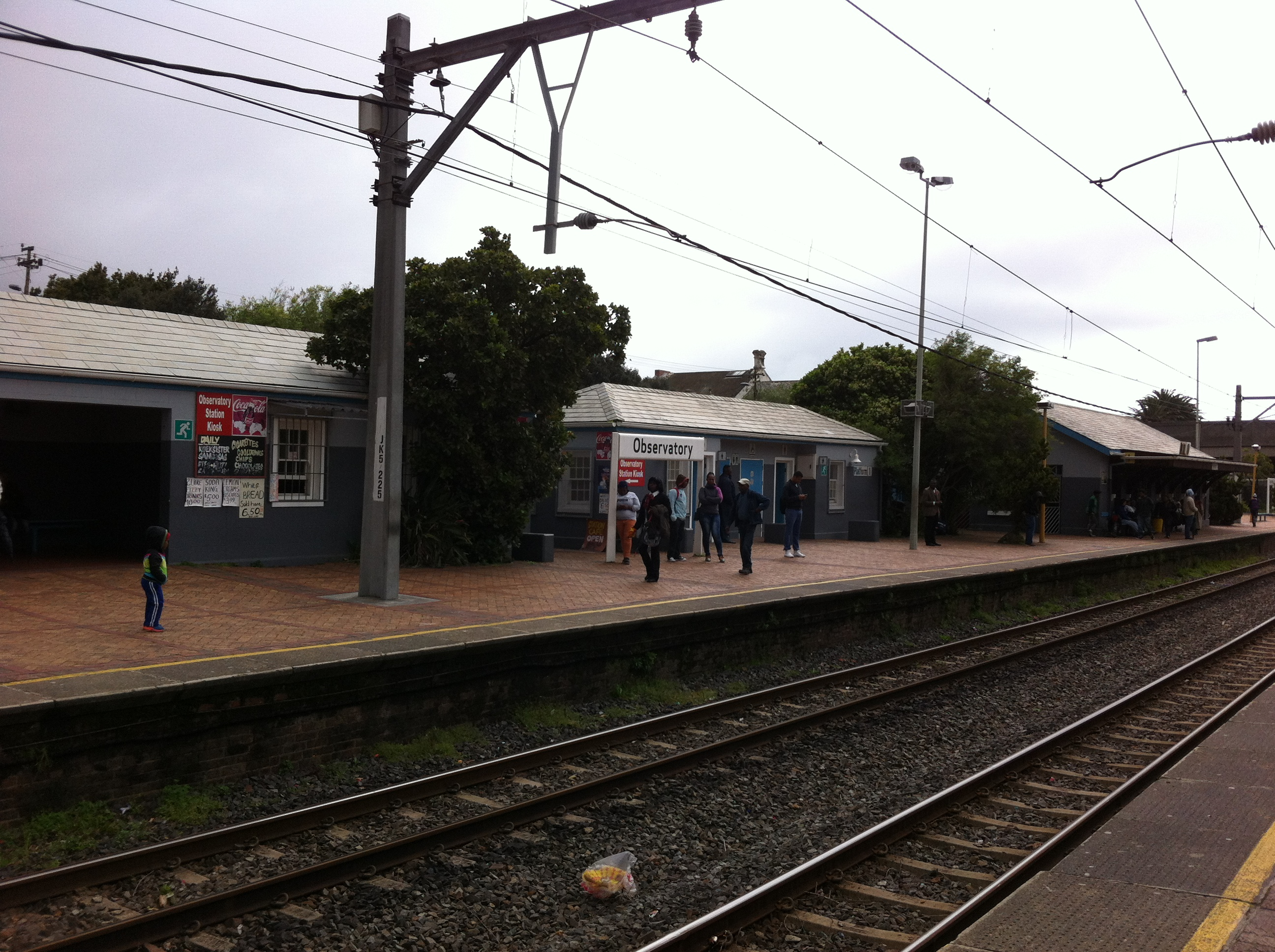

General information
- Location: Trill Road, Observatory 7925, Cape Town; South Africa
- Coordinates: 33°56′17″S 18°28′17″E
- System: Metrorail station
- Owner: PRASA
- Line: Southern Line
- Platforms: 2 side platforms
- Tracks: 2

Construction
- Structure type: At-grade

Services
Preceding station	Metrorail Western Cape	Following station
Salt River towards Cape Town	Southern Line	Mowbray towards Simon's Town
Location
- Location within Cape Town Location within South Africa

Observatory railway station is a Metrorail station serving the suburb of Observatory in Cape Town. It is served by trains on the Southern Line.

The station is located under the Station Road bridge. It has two tracks served by two side platforms, connected by pedestrian subways.

The station opened as part of the Wynberg line on 19 December 1864.

== Notable places nearby ==
- Groote Schuur Hospital and the University of Cape Town Medical School
- South African Astronomical Observatory headquarters
- Hartleyvale Stadium
- Parish Church of St Michael and All Angels
