= Huguenot railway station (South Africa) =

Railway station in Paarl, South Africa

Huguenot
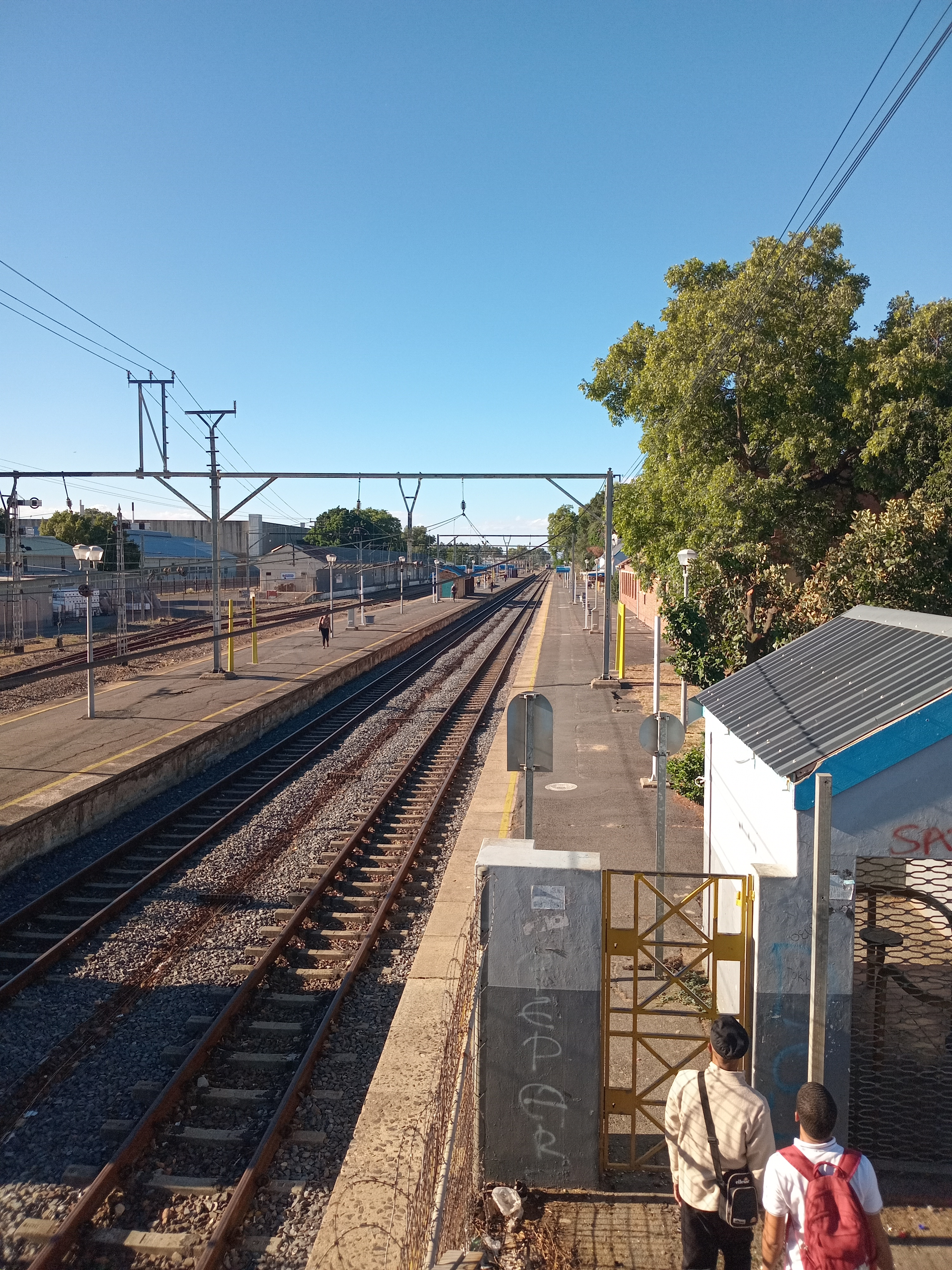
- The railway tracks at the station

General information
- Location: Huguenot Bypass, Paarl 7646, Western Cape; South Africa
- Coordinates: 33°43′48″S 18°58′36″E
- System: Railway station
- Owner: TFR
- Line: Shosholoza Meyl: Johannesburg–Cape Town Cape Town–East London Metrorail: Northern Line
- Platforms: 1 side, 1 island
- Tracks: 3

Construction
- Structure type: At-grade
Location
- Location within South Africa

Huguenot railway station is the main passenger railway station in the town of Paarl, Western Cape, South Africa. It is served by Metrorail commuter trains on the Northern Line. It is also the second stop out of Cape Town for Shosholoza Meyl inter-city trains originating or terminating there.

The station opened as part of the railway line from Cape Town to Wellington on 4 November 1863. The station derives its name from the French Huguenot settlers who settled in the Paarl Valley during the late 17th century.

Although there is a railway station bearing the name of "Paarl", it is located in an industrial area in the southern part of Paarl, and express and inter-city trains do not stop there.

Huguenot station has three tracks for passenger trains, accessed by a side platform and an island platform connected by a pedestrian bridge and subway.

== Services ==
Preceding station	Shosholoza Meyl	Following station
Wellington towards Johannesburg	Johannesburg–Cape Town	Bellville towards Cape Town
Bellville towards Cape Town	Cape Town–East London	Wellington towards East London
Preceding station	Metrorail Western Cape	Following station
Paarl towards Cape Town	Northern Line Wellington service	Dal Josafat towards Wellington
