= Malmesbury Line (Metrorail) =

Overview
- Status: Operational
- Owner: PRASA
- Termini: Cape Town; Malmesbury
- Stations: 20

Service
- Type: Commuter rail
- System: Metrorail Western Cape
- Operator(s): Metrorail

Technical
- Line length: 79.4 km (49.3 mi)
- Number of tracks: 2 (Cape Town-Kraaifontein); 1 (Kraaifontein-Malmesbury)
- Track gauge: 1,067 mm (3 ft 6 in)

The Malmesbury Line is a regional commuter rail line operated by Metrorail Western Cape. It connects Cape Town with the town of Malmesbury.

The service operates mainly as a limited peak period commuter train between Malmesbury and Cape Town. Unlike most lines, which are electrified, the Malmesbury service historically relies on diesel locomotives for sections north of Kraaifontein.

== Route ==
Interactive Map
