= Central Line (Cape Town) =

Commuter rail service in Cape Town, South Africa

Overview
- Status: Operational
- Owner: PRASA
- Locale: Cape Town, South Africa
- Termini: Cape Town; Kapteinsklip Chris Hani Bellville
- Stations: 33

Service
- Type: Commuter rail
- System: Metrorail Western Cape
- Services: 4
- Train number(s): 9000–9099: Bellville ↔ Mutual (via Langa); 9400–9499: Nolungile ↔ Cape Town (via Mutual); 9500–9599: Kapteinsklip ↔ Cape Town (via Pinelands); 9900–9999: Chris Hani ↔ Cape Town (via Mutual)
- Operator(s): Metrorail
- Depot(s): Salt River
- Rolling stock: X'Trapolis Mega

Technical
- Number of tracks: 2–4
- Track gauge: 1,067 mm (3 ft 6 in)
- Electrification: Overhead catenary

The Central Line is a commuter rail service in Cape Town, South Africa, operated by Metrorail Western Cape. Central Line services operate along two routes from central Cape Town to Langa, and then along three branches from Langa to various areas in the south-east of the city. The first branch runs to Mitchell's Plain, the second to Khayelitsha, and the third passes through Belhar to terminate in Bellville.

== Route ==
Central Line trains depart from Cape Town station on one of two routes. The first route runs along the original Cape Town–Bellville main line through Salt River to Maitland, and then branches south to pass around the western and southern edge of Pinelands to Langa station. The other route runs along the relief main line past Paarden Eiland and then branches south through Kensington to Mutual station; from Mutual it runs along the eastern edge of Pinelands to Langa.

From Langa, all trains pass through Bonteheuwel station; some continue east through Bishop Lavis and Belhar, passing the University of the Western Cape before turning north and then west to terminate at Bellville. Other trains branch south after Bonteheuwel, passing Manenberg and Gugulethu to Philippi station.

From Philippi, one branch passes south through Mitchell's Plain to terminate at Kapteinsklip station, while the other passes south-east through Khayelitsha to terminate at Chris Hani station.

Most trains to Mitchell's Plain use the Salt River route from Cape Town to Langa, while most trains to Bellville or Khayelitsha use the Mutual route, but there are some exceptions.

=== Station listing ===
The Central Line serves the following stations:

Cape Town
Woodstock		Esplanade
Salt River		Paarden Eiland
Koeberg Road		Ysterplaat
Maitland		Mutual
Ndabeni		
Pinelands
Langa
Bonteheuwel
Netreg		Lavistown
Heideveld		Belhar
Nyanga		Unibell
Philippi		Pentech
Lentegeur	Stock Road	Sarepta
Mitchell's Plain	Mandalay	Bellville
Kapteinsklip	Nolungile	
	Nonkqubela	
Khayelitsha
Kuyasa
Chris Hani

Interactive Map

== Operation ==
The line is made up of 1,067 mm (3 ft 6 in) track, electrified with 3,000 V DC overhead catenary; all parts of the line are at least double track. Services are operated mostly by electric multiple units of Class 5M2 and (on the Khayelitsha line) Class 8M.

== Current situation ==
After 2011, PRASA was increasingly unable to maintain the line, and the Khayelitsha line ceased operation in 2019 due to vandalism and metal theft. More recently, plans to reopen it have been thwarted by squatters occupying the railway territory. It is proposed to re-open the line by December 2022, though many previous deadlines have been missed. Rail workers attempting to restore the line have been assaulted by armed gangs. As of 2023, service is gradually being restored.

The Central Line was reopened in late May 2025. During a Parliamentary session, the Chairperson of the Portfolio Committee on Transport, Donald Selamolela, expressed appreciation for the reopening of the Central Line. A reopening ceremony was attended by the Minister of Transport, Barbara Creecy; Deputy Minister of Transport, Mkhuleko Hlengwa; and City of Cape Town Mayor, Geordin Hill-Lewis.

Selamolela urged the community and community leaders to play a role in protecting and guarding the rolling stock and the network. He further stated that the reopening should not end with the photo opportunity of officials, but with a real change in people’s lives, through the provision of affordable, safe, and reliable public transport, and with rail being the preferred mode of transport. Selamolela stated that PRASA should work to regain people's trust in its rail services.
