= Northern Line (Cape Town) =

Commuter rail service in Cape Town, South Africa

- Northern Line railway tracks near Century City, Cape Town, with Table Mountain behind

Overview
- Status: Operational
- Owner: PRASA
- Locale: Cape Town, South Africa
- Termini: Cape Town; Bellville Wellington Muldersvlei Strand
- Stations: 48
- Website: prasa.com

Service
- Type: Commuter rail
- System: Metrorail Western Cape
- Services: 8
- Train numbers: 2300–2399: Eersterivier ↔ Cape Town (via Monte Vista/Salt River); 2500–2599: Kraaifontein ↔ Cape Town (via Salt River); 2600–2699: Kraaifontein ↔ Cape Town (via Monte Vista); ~~2700–2799: Bellville ↔ Cape Town (via Salt River)~~; 2800–2899: Bellville ↔ Cape Town (via Monte Vista); 3200–3299: Strand ↔ Bellville/Cape Town (via Salt River); 3400–3499: Du Toit ↔ Cape Town (via Eersterivier); 3500–3599: Wellington ↔ Cape Town (via Kraaifontein)
- Operator: Metrorail
- Depot: Salt River
- Rolling stock: Class 5M2; Class 10M5; X'Trapolis Mega

Technical
- Track gauge: 1,067 mm (3 ft 6 in)
- Electrification: Overhead catenary

The Northern Line is a commuter rail service in South Africa that in the Cape Town metropolitan area and its surroundings and is operated by Metrorail Western Cape. Northern Line services operate from central Cape Town to Bellville, and then from Bellville along three different routes. The first route runs along the main Cape Town–De Aar railway line to Paarl and Wellington. The second route passes through Stellenbosch to terminate at Muldersvlei station on the main line, while the third also passes through Somerset West to terminate in Strand.

Operations on the Northern Line halted in March 2020 in response to the COVID-19 pandemic. Operations resumed in late 2021 with trains on the relief main line past Century City and Monte Vista terminating at Kraaifontein. In early 2022, operations on the old main line through Salt River and Maitland as well as operations to Wellington resumed. In November 2023, operations to Strand resumed. In 2024, operations on the line to Muldersvlei station through Stellenbosch resumed. As of September 2024, all segments of the Northern Line are operational.

== Route ==
Most Northern Line trains travel from Cape Town station along the old main line through Salt River, Maitland, Goodwood and Parow to Bellville station. Trains on the Wellington route continue from Bellville along the main line through Brackenfell and Kraaifontein, and then through the farmland outside the metropolitan area to reach the towns of Paarl and Wellington.

Other trains branch south-east after Bellville, passing through Kuils River to Eerste River; From there, some turn north to pass through Stellenbosch and terminate at Muldersvlei station on the main line, while others continue south-east through Somerset West along the line towards Caledon. Shortly after Somerset West they branch from this line to terminate at Strand on the False Bay coast.

The Northern Line also includes a service along the relief main line from Cape Town past Century City and Monte Vista to Bellville.

=== Station listing ===
The Northern line serves the following stations:

Cape Town
Woodstock		Esplanade
Salt River		Ysterplaat
Koeberg Road		Kentemade
Maitland		Century City
Woltemade		Akasia Park
Mutual		Monte Vista
Thornton		De Grendel
Goodwood		Avondale
Vasco		Oosterzee
Elsies River		
Parow
Tygerberg
Bellville
Kuils River		Stikland
Blackheath		Brackenfell
Melton Rose		Eikefontein
Eerste River		Kraaifontein
Faure	Lynedoch	Muldersvlei
Firgrove	Vlottenburg	Klapmuts
Somerset West	Stellenbosch	Paarl
Van der Stel	Du Toit	Huguenot
Strand	~~Koelenhof~~	Dal Josafat
	~~Muldersvlei~~	Mbekweni
		Wellington

Interactive Map

== Operation ==
The line is made up of 1,067 mm (3 ft 6 in) track, electrified with 3,000 V DC overhead catenary; most of the routes are at least double track, except for the Strand and Stellenbosch lines beyond Eerste River. Services are operated with electric multiple units of Class 5M2 and X'Trapolis Mega. As of 2026, trains run Monday through Saturday with varying frequency (every 15 minutes at peak times to one hour on weekends). There is no service on Sundays.
