= Cape Flats Line =

Commuter rail line in Cape Town, South Africa

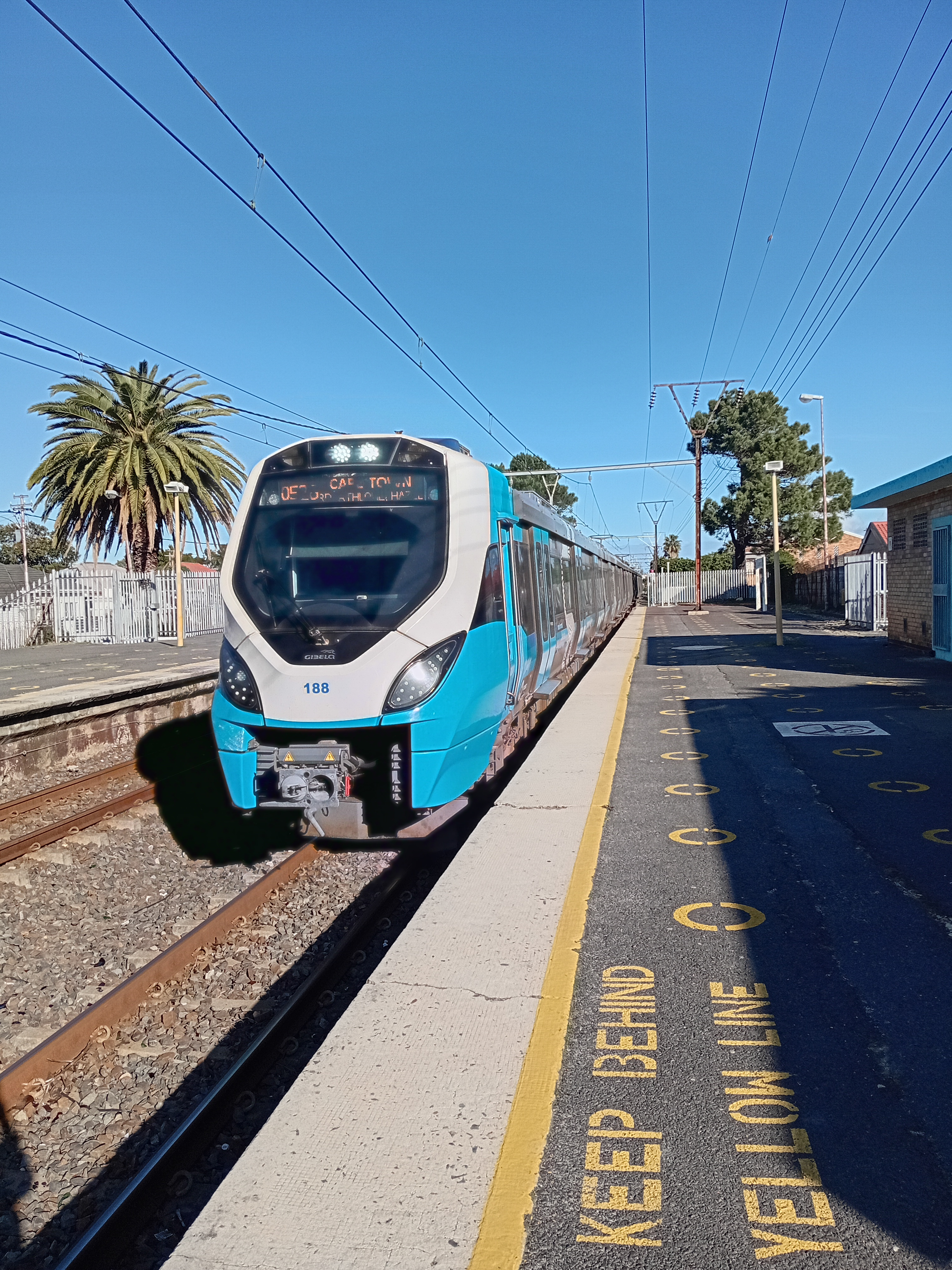
- Train arriving at Crawford railway station

Overview
- Status: Operational
- Owner: PRASA
- Locale: Cape Town, South Africa
- Termini: Cape Town; Retreat
- Connecting lines: Southern Line
- Stations: 16

Service
- Type: Commuter rail
- System: Metrorail Western Cape
- Train number(s): 0500–0599
- Operator(s): Metrorail
- Depot(s): Salt River
- Rolling stock: X'Trapolis Mega

Technical
- Line length: 23.8 km (14.8 mi)
- Number of tracks: 2
- Track gauge: 1,067 mm (3 ft 6 in)
- Electrification: Overhead catenary

The Cape Flats Line is a commuter rail line in Cape Town, South Africa, operated by Metrorail Western Cape. It connects central Cape Town with the suburbs of Pinelands, Athlone, Lansdowne, Ottery, Southfield, Healthfield and Retreat.

== Operation ==
The line is made up of double 1,067 mm (3 ft 6 in) track, electrified with 3,000 V DC overhead catenary. Services are operated by electric multiple units of X'Trapolis Mega.

== Route ==
The Cape Flats Line service begins at the central Cape Town railway station, from which it runs east along the Cape Town–Bellville main line as far as Maitland. After Maitland station it goes off to the south, passing along the western edge of Pinelands before crossing under the N2 freeway and over the Black River. It then continues south through Athlone and Lansdowne, and then south-west through Ottery and Southfield, before joining the Southern Line route at Heathfield. Services on the Cape Flats Line terminate occasionally at Heathfield, with the line terminus being Retreat.

Interactive Map

== See also ==
- Metrorail Western Cape
