= Retreat railway station =

Metrorail station on the Southern Line

Retreat

General information
- Location: Station Road, Retreat, 7945, Cape Town; South Africa
- Coordinates: 34.06°S 18.463°E
- System: Metrorail station
- Owner: PRASA
- Line: Southern Line Cape Flats Line
- Platforms: 1 side platform, 1 island
- Tracks: 3
- Connections: Golden Arrow Bus Services, Mini bus taxis

Construction
- Structure type: At-grade

Services
Preceding station	Metrorail Western Cape	Following station
Heathfield towards Cape Town	Southern Line	Steen berg towards Simon's Town
Heathfield towards Cape Town	Cape Flats Line	Terminus
Location
- Location within Cape Town Location within South Africa

Retreat railway station is a Metrorail station in Retreat, a suburb of Cape Town. It is a stop on the Southern Line and serves as the terminus of the Cape Flats Line. The station is located next to a terminus of Golden Arrow Bus Services and a large minibus taxi rank, forming a major transport interchange for the South Peninsula region.

The station building is on the western side of the line, attached to Platform 1. Platforms 2 and 3 are on an island. The platforms are connected by two pedestrian bridges. In normal operation, Platform 1 is used for northbound trains (travelling towards Cape Town), and Platform 2 is used for southbound trains.

== Notable places nearby ==
- Blue Route Mall
- Retreat Central Recreational Area
