= Bellville railway station =

Railway station in the town of Bellville, Western Cape, South Africa

Bellville

General information
- Location: Durban Road, Bellville, 7530, Western Cape; South Africa
- Coordinates: 33.9065°S 18.6275°E
- System: Railway station
- Owner: PRASA
- Line: Shosholoza Meyl: Johannesburg–Cape Town Cape Town–East London Metrorail: Northern Line Central Line
- Platforms: 1 side platform, 4 islands, and 1 island containing 2 bays
- Tracks: 11
- Connections: Golden Arrow Bus Services; minibus taxis

Construction
- Structure type: At-grade
Location
- Location within Cape Town Location within South Africa

Bellville mainline railway station is a railway station in the town of Bellville, Western Cape, South Africa. It is the second-biggest station in the Metrorail Western Cape railway network, after the Cape Town terminus. All trains on Metrorail's Northern Line pass through Bellville, and one branch of the Central Line also terminates there. It is also a stop for Shosholoza Meyl trains that terminate in Cape Town.

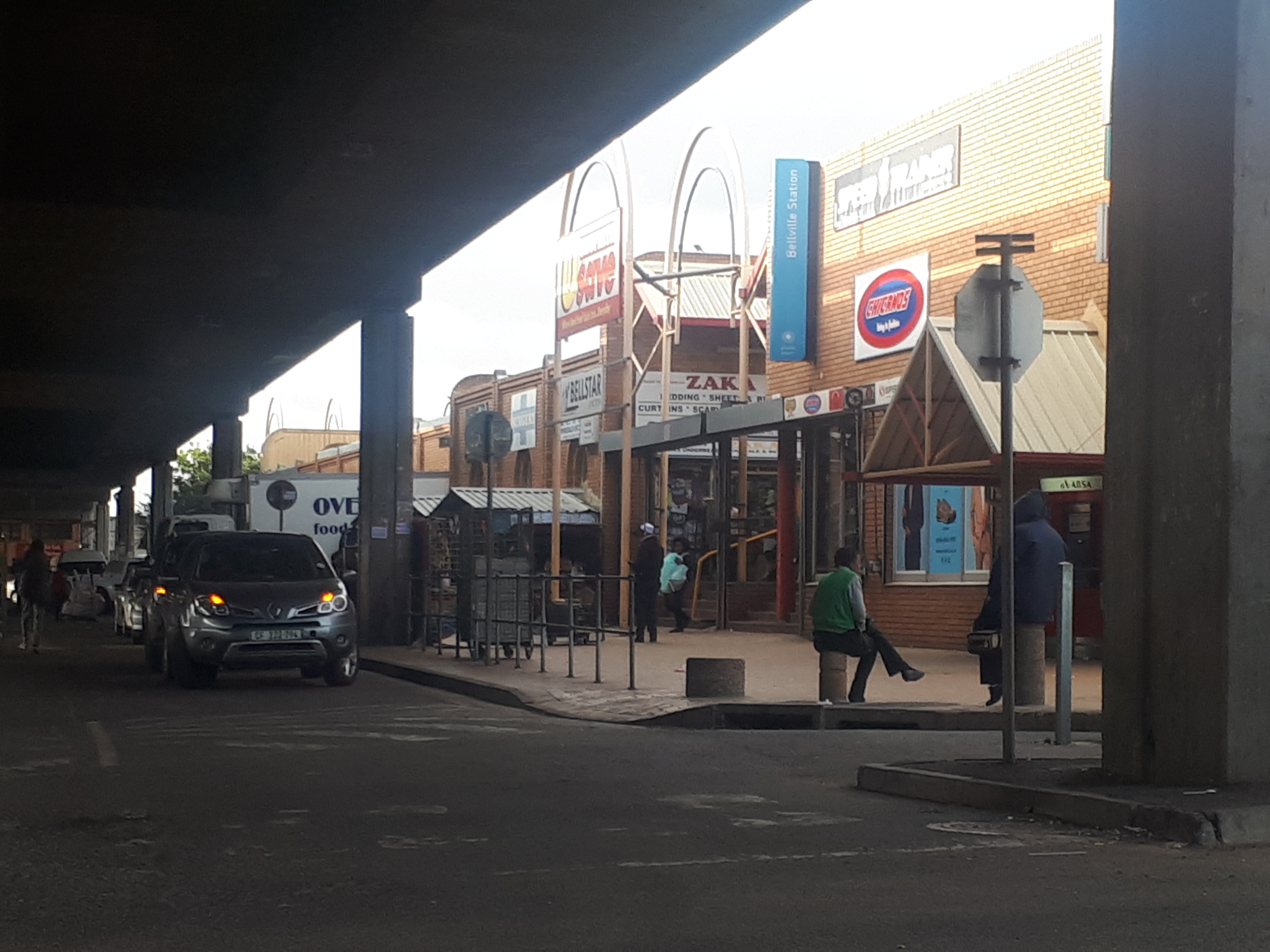
Bellville Station 2018

Bellville Station is a major terminus for Golden Arrow buses; it also has a large minibus taxi rank. To the south of the station is Transnet Freight Rail's main marshalling yard for the Cape Town area.

The station building is on the northern side of the tracks, attached to a side platform. There are four island platforms and an island containing two bays for trains traveling to and from Cape Town. The platforms are linked by two pedestrian tunnels.

== Notable places nearby ==
- Bellville Civic Centre
- Bellville Sports Ground
- Northlink College Protea campus
- Tygerberg Medical Campus

== Services ==
Preceding station	Shosholoza Meyl	Following station
Huguenot towards Johannesburg	Johannesburg–Cape Town	Cape Town Terminus
Cape Town Terminus	Cape Town–East London	Huguenot towards East London
Preceding station	Metrorail Western Cape	Following station
Oosterzee towards Cape Town	Northern Line services via Monte Vista	Terminus
Tygerberg towards Cape Town	Northern Line Wellington service	Stikland towards Wellington
Tygerberg towards Cape Town	Northern Line Stellenbosch service	Kuils River towards Muldersvlei
Tygerberg towards Cape Town	Northern Line Strand service	Kuils River towards Strand
Sarepta towards Cape Town	Central Line Bellville service	Terminus
