= Wellington railway station (South Africa) =

Railway station in South Africa

Wellington

General information
- Location: Stasieweg, Wellington 7655
- Coordinates: 33°38′5″S 18°59′31″E
- System: Railway station
- Owner: TFR
- Line: Shosholoza Meyl: Johannesburg–Cape Town Cape Town–East London Metrorail: Northern Line
- Platforms: 1
- Tracks: 2

Construction
- Structure type: At-grade
Location

Wellington railway station is the railway station that serves the town of Wellington in the Western Cape province of South Africa. It is the terminus of the Metrorail Northern Line service from Cape Town Station, except for a single train daily in each direction as far as Worcester. Wellington is also a stop for Shosholoza Meyl inter-city trains that originate or terminate in Cape Town.

The station has two tracks for passenger trains; one is a terminal track facing towards Cape Town and the other is a through track. They are accessed by a single platform attached to the station building, which lies on the western side of the tracks.

== Services ==
Preceding station	Shosholoza Meyl	Following station
Worcester towards Johannesburg	Johannesburg–Cape Town	Huguenot towards Cape Town
Huguenot towards Cape Town	Cape Town–East London	Worcester towards East London
Preceding station	Metrorail Western Cape	Following station
Mbekweni towards Cape Town	Northern Line Wellington service	Terminus
