= Southern Line (Cape Town) =

Metrorail railway line in South Africa

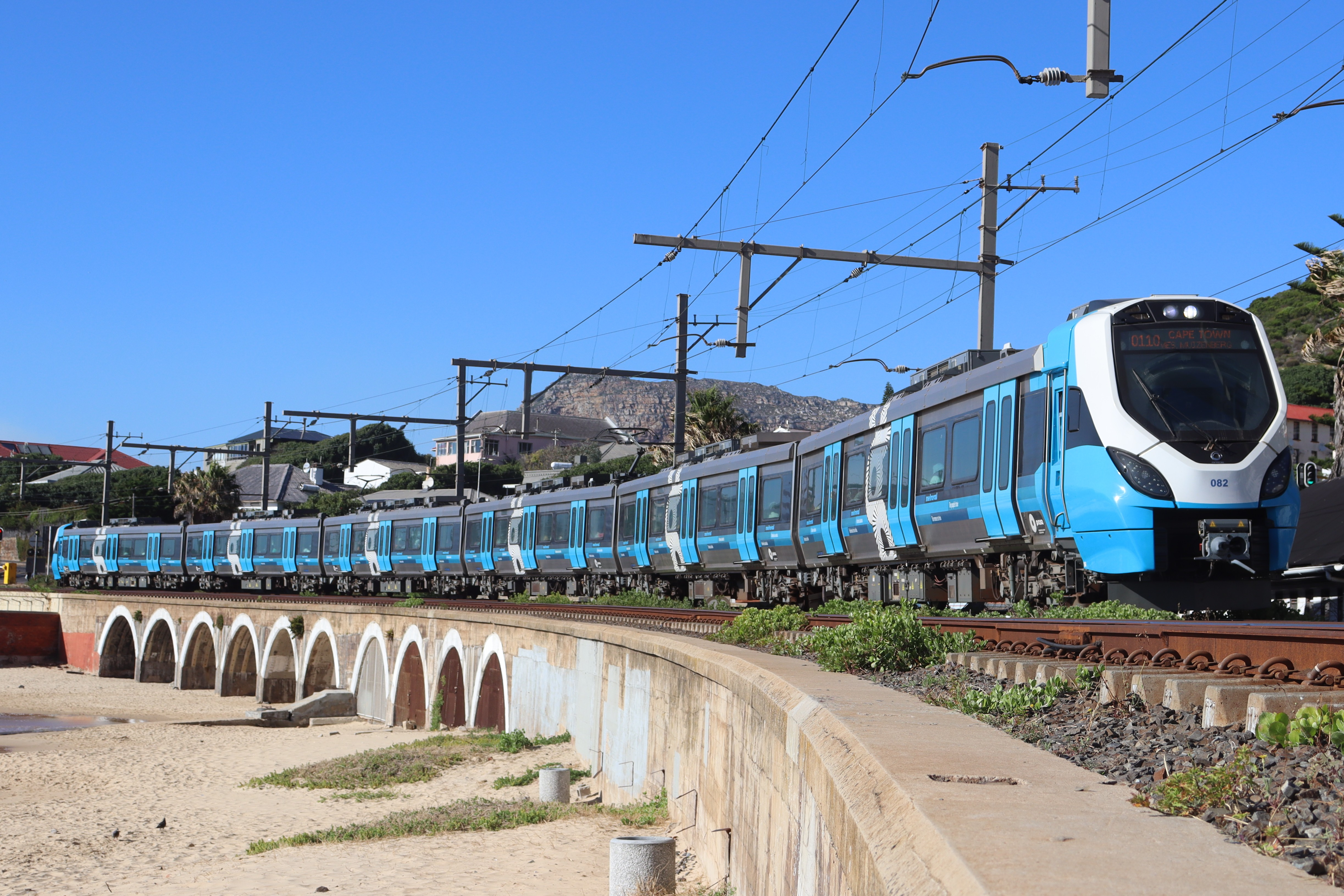
- A Southern Line train running near Kalk Bay station

Overview
- Status: Operational
- Owner: PRASA
- Locale: Cape Town, Western Cape, South Africa
- Termini: Cape Town; Simon's Town
- Connecting lines: Cape Flats Line
- Stations: 28

Service
- Type: Commuter rail
- System: Metrorail Western Cape
- Train number: 0100–0299
- Operator: Metrorail
- Depot: Salt River
- Rolling stock: X'Trapolis Mega

History
- Opened: 1882

Technical
- Line length: 36 km (22 mi)
- Number of tracks: 2 (Cape Town-Fish Hoek); 1 (Fish Hoek-Simon's Town)
- Track gauge: 1,067 mm (3 ft 6 in)
- Electrification: Overhead catenary

The Southern Line is a commuter rail line operated by Metrorail Western Cape, connecting Cape Town station in central Cape Town, South Africa with the Southern Suburbs and the towns on the west coast of False Bay, terminating in Simon's Town.

== History ==
The Wynberg Railway Company was established in 1861 to build a railway line from Salt River Junction to Wynberg, which opened on 19 December 1864. In 1876 the company was taken over by the Cape Government Railways, and the line, which had originally been built to the standard gauge, was rebuilt to Cape gauge.

The extension to Muizenberg opened on 15 December 1882, and a further extension to Kalk Bay on 5 May 1883. Initially there were no stops between Wynberg and Muizenberg. A turntable for the steam locomotive, built by Cowans Sheldon and Co Ltd in Carlisle in the UK, was installed at Kalk Bay. There was a corresponding turntable in Cape Town just south-east of the railway crossing Strand street. The final extension, to the naval base at Simon's Town, opened on 1 December 1890, and the Kalk Bay turntable was moved there. The line was electrified with a 3000V DC overhead catenary in 1928.

== Operation ==
The line runs on "Cape gauge" 3 ft 6 in (1,067 mm) track, and is electrified with 3,000 V DC overhead catenary. Service on the line is provided by Electric Multiple Units of X'Trapolis Mega as of February 2023.

Previously, the South African Class 5M2 and South African Class 10M3 were used with the X'Trapolis Mega. The Class 5M2 and 10M3 units were made up in an eight-car configuration, shorter than on the other Metrorail routes in Cape Town, because many of the platforms on the Southern Line are too short to handle longer trains.

Trains do not normally operate on a Sunday or a public holiday.

== Route ==
The line has a single service. It starts at Cape Town station. Trains run east through Woodstock and Salt River on tracks shared with other Metrorail routes, including the Cape Flats Line and the line to Mutual.

After Salt River, the route turns south. It passes through the southern suburbs via Observatory, Mowbray, Rosebank, Rondebosch, Newlands, Claremont, Harfield Road, and Kenilworth to Wynberg.

South of Wynberg, trains stop at Wittebome, Plumstead, Steurhof, Diep River, and Heathfield, where the Cape Flats Line joins, then continue to Retreat. Some trains terminate at Retreat. Most continue south through Lakeside and False Bay to Muizenberg, where the line meets the False Bay coast.

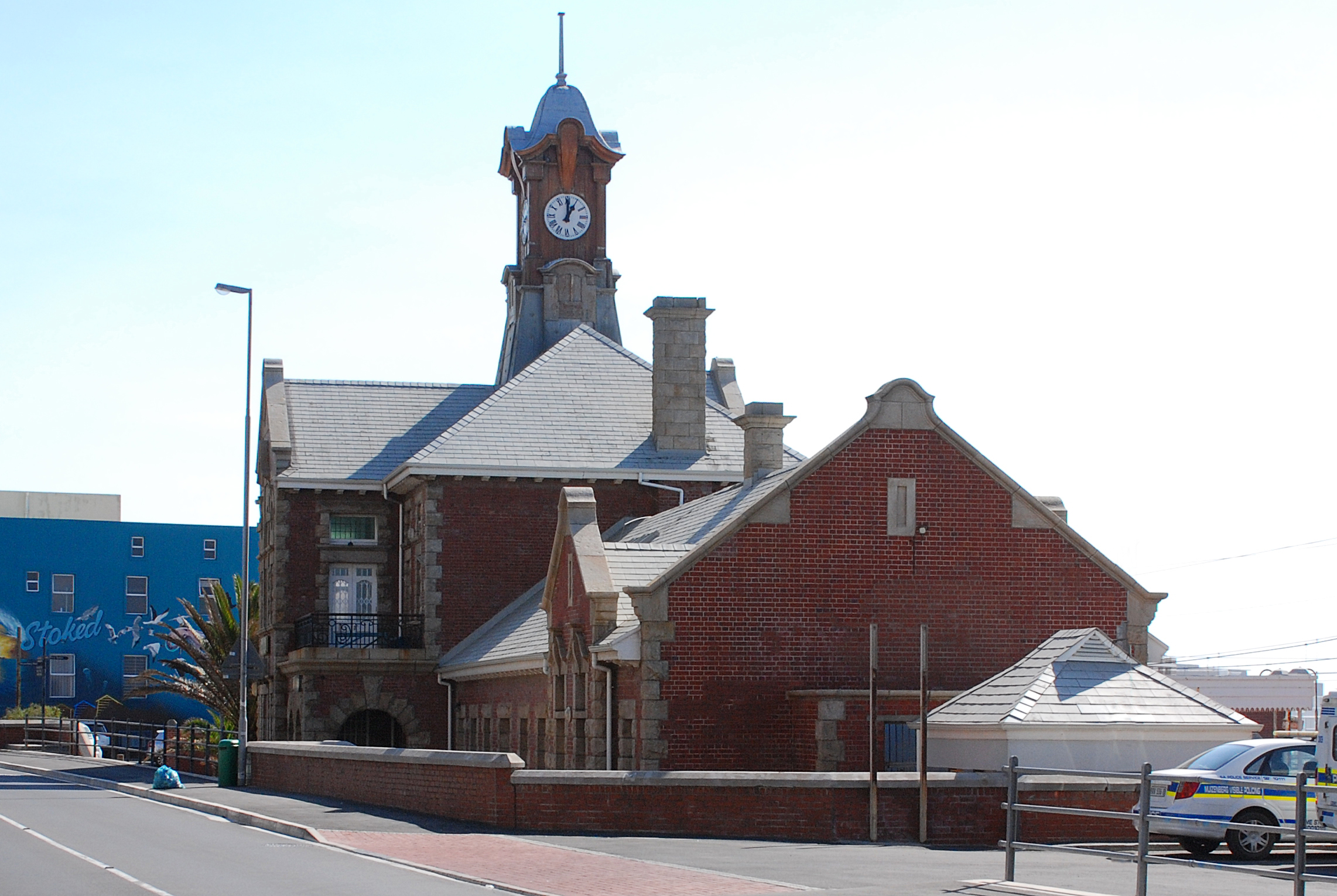
Muizenberg railway station

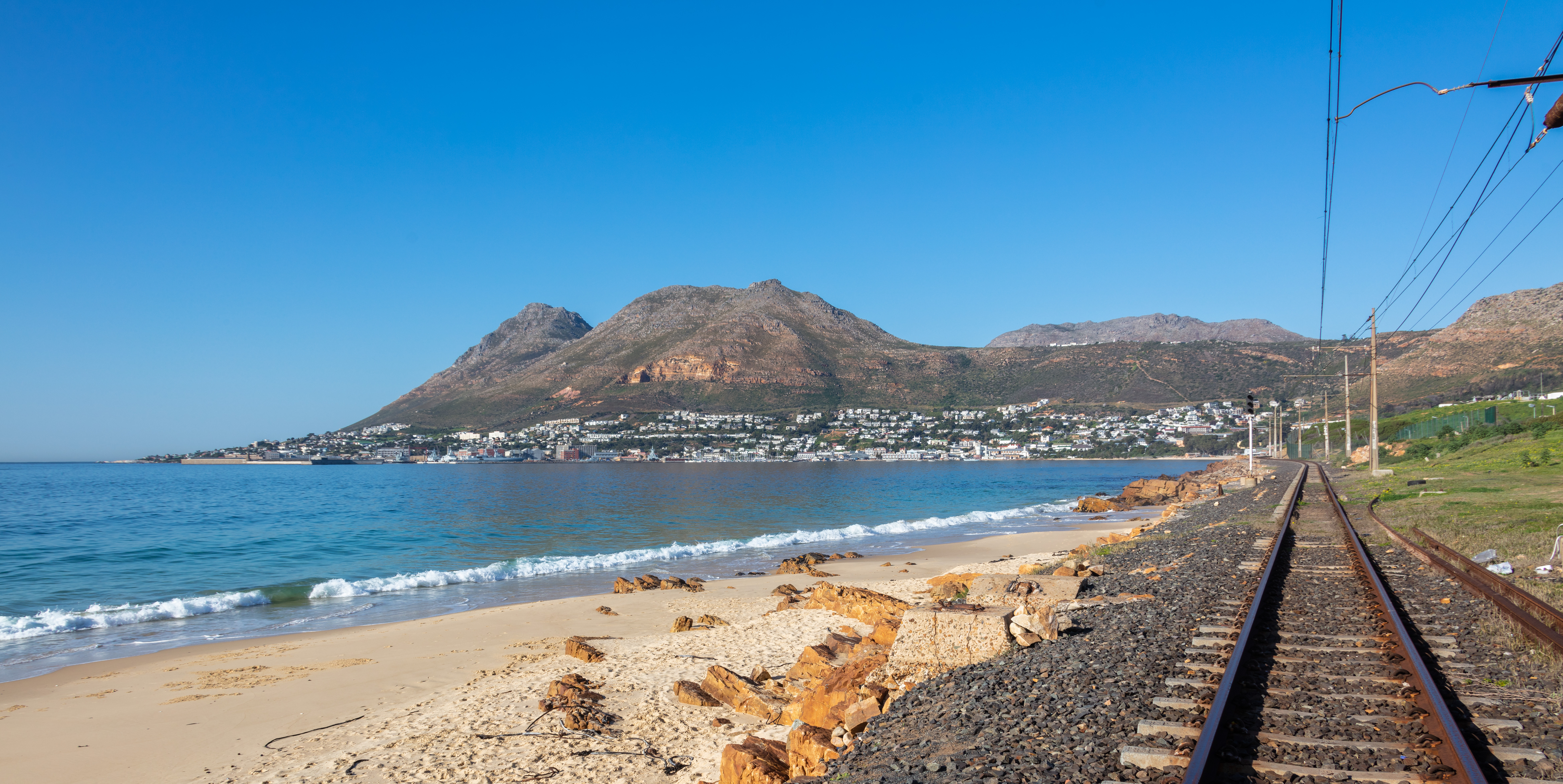
Railway as it approaches Simon's Town

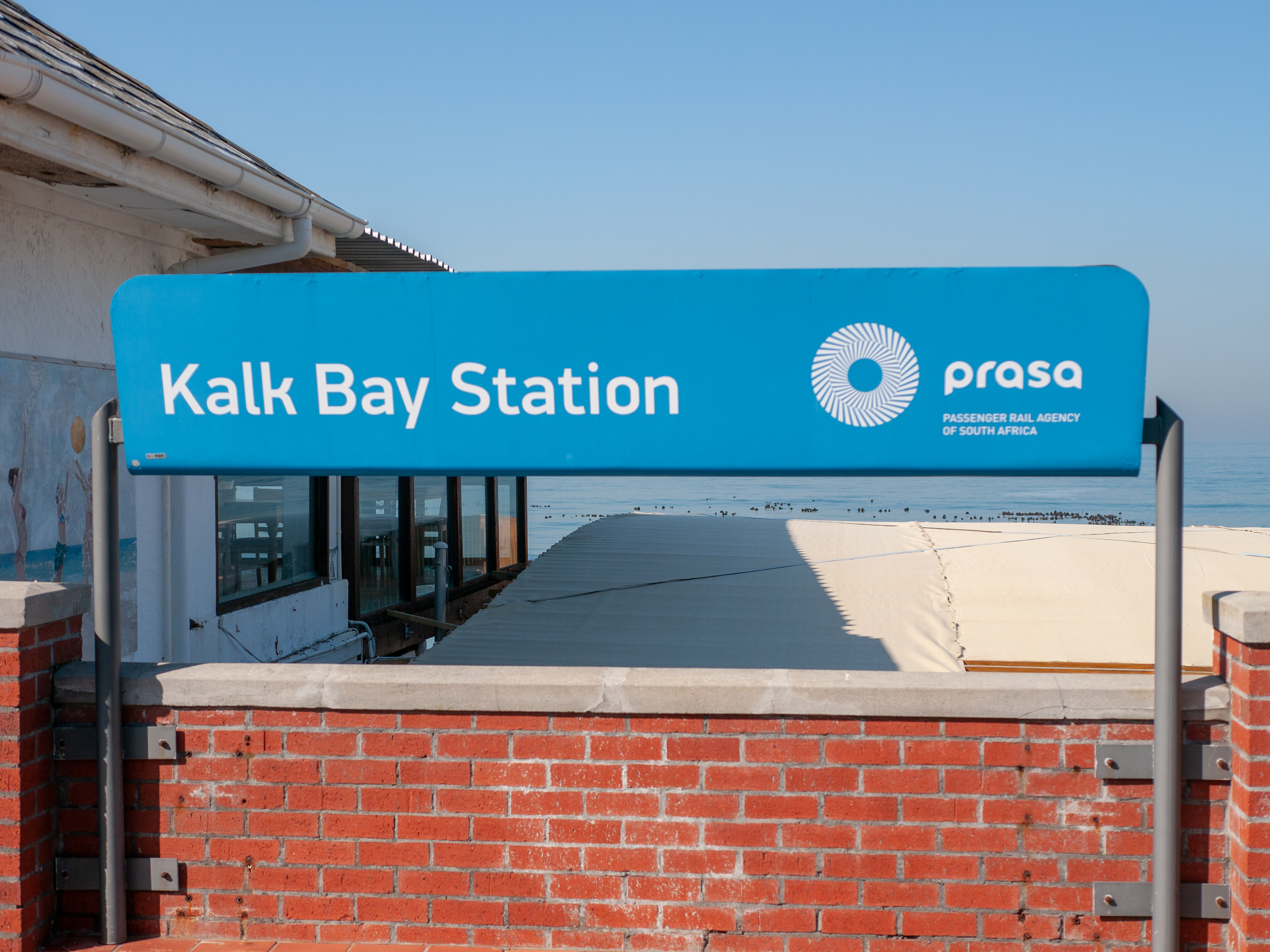
Signage at Kalk Bay Station

From Muizenberg, the line runs south-west along the coast. A narrow strip of rocks and beach separates the tracks from the sea. Stations at St James and Kalk Bay are popular with beach users, as is Fish Hoek. Double track ends at Fish Hoek, where many trains terminate. Others continue on single track along the coast through Sunny Cove and Glencairn to the terminus at Simon's Town.

Interactive Map

== Tourism ==
In 2007, Cape Town Tourism, the City of Cape Town, and Metrorail collaborated to promote the Southern Line as a tourist route, focusing on tourist attractions near Cape Town, Observatory, Newlands, Muizenberg, Kalk Bay and Simon's Town stations. This includes a "hop-on, hop-off" ticket allowing unlimited travel on the line during off-peak hours.

== See also ==
- Metrorail Western Cape
- Muizenberg railway station
