= Cape Town railway station =

Main railway station of Cape Town, South Africa

Cape Town
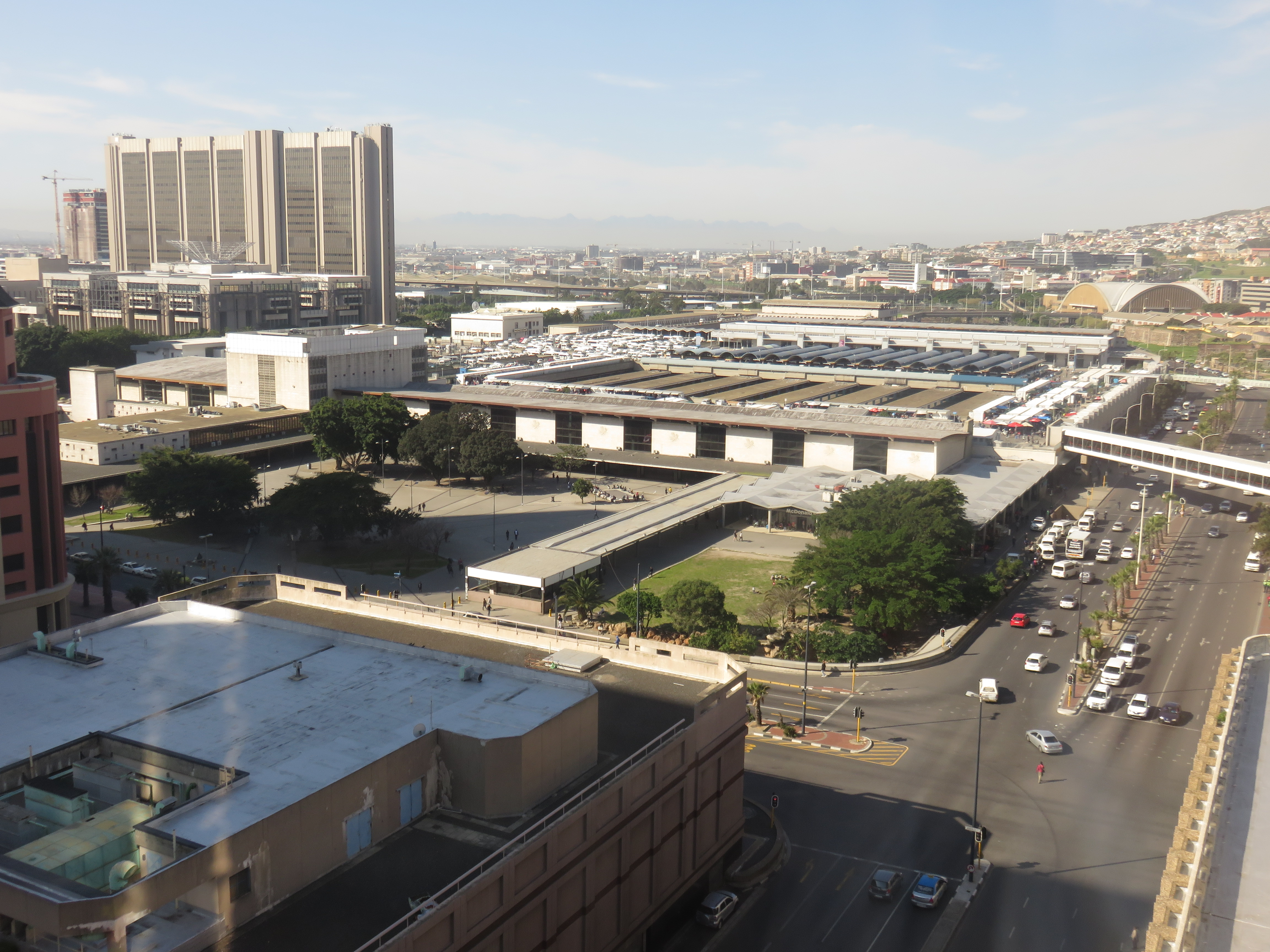
- Cape Town Station in 2018

General information
- Location: Adderley Street, CBD, Cape Town, 8000; South Africa
- Coordinates: 33°55′20″S 18°25′35″E
- System: Railway station
- Owner: PRASA
- Line: Metrorail: Northern Line Central Line Cape Flats Line Southern Line Shosholoza Meyl: Johannesburg–Cape Town Cape Town–East London Premier Classe: Johannesburg–Cape Town
- Platforms: 24 terminus platforms
- Tracks: 24
- Connections: MyCiTi BRT; Golden Arrow Bus Services; Minibus taxis

Construction
- Structure type: At-grade

History
- Opened: 1863
- Rebuilt: 1961
Location
- Location within Cape Town Location within South Africa

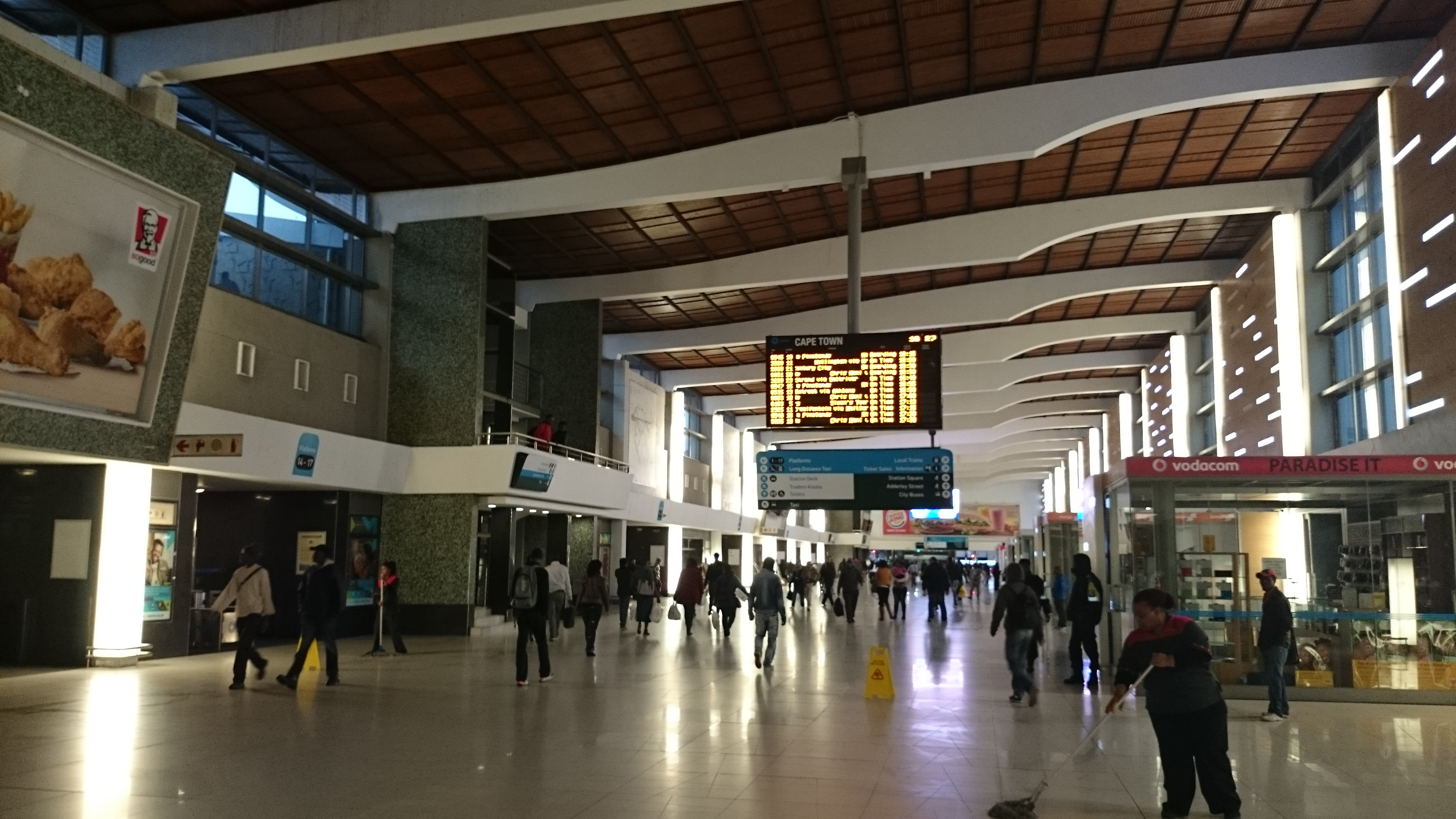
Cape Town railway station after renovations

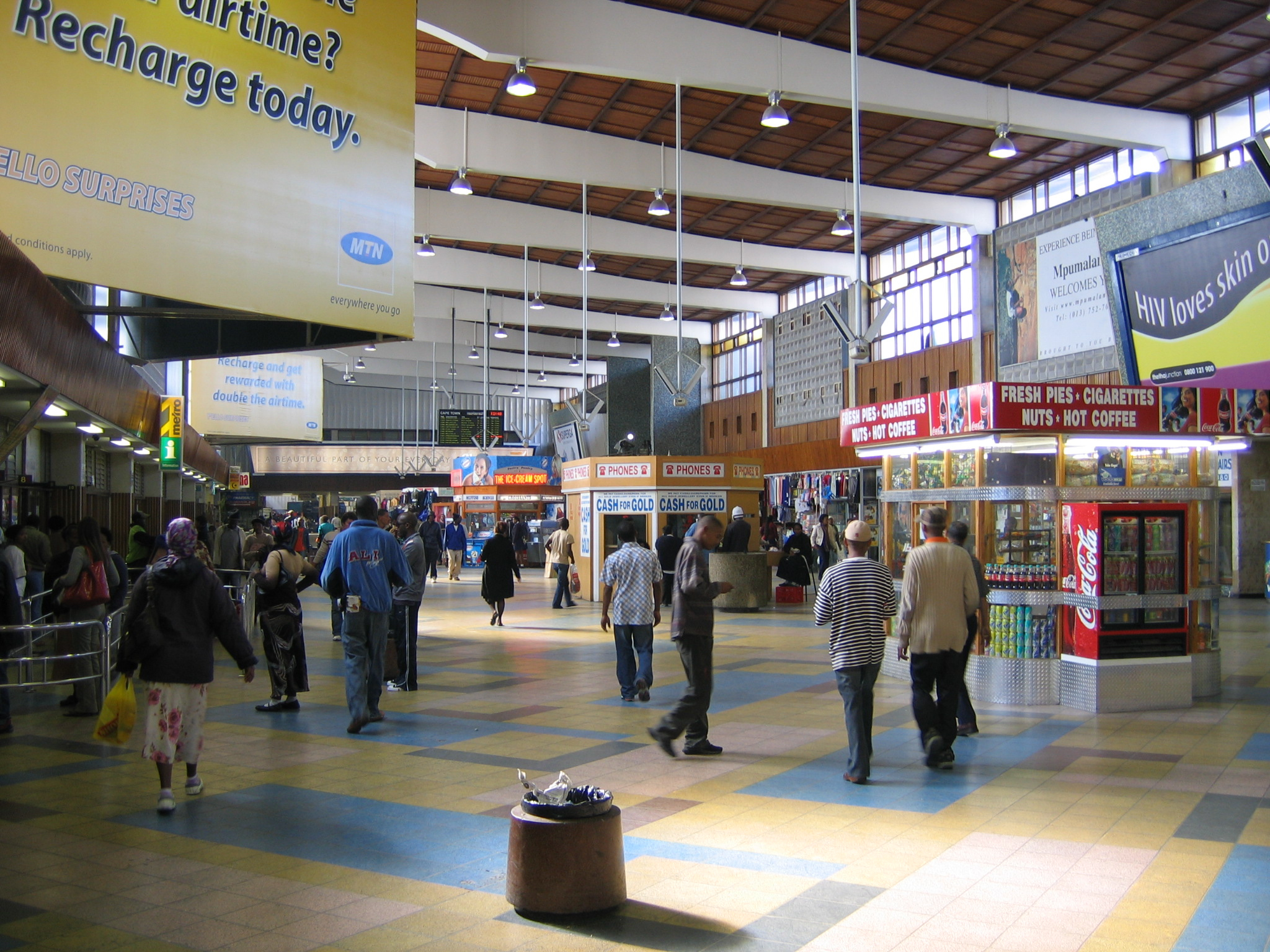
Cape Town station in 2006, before its upgrade

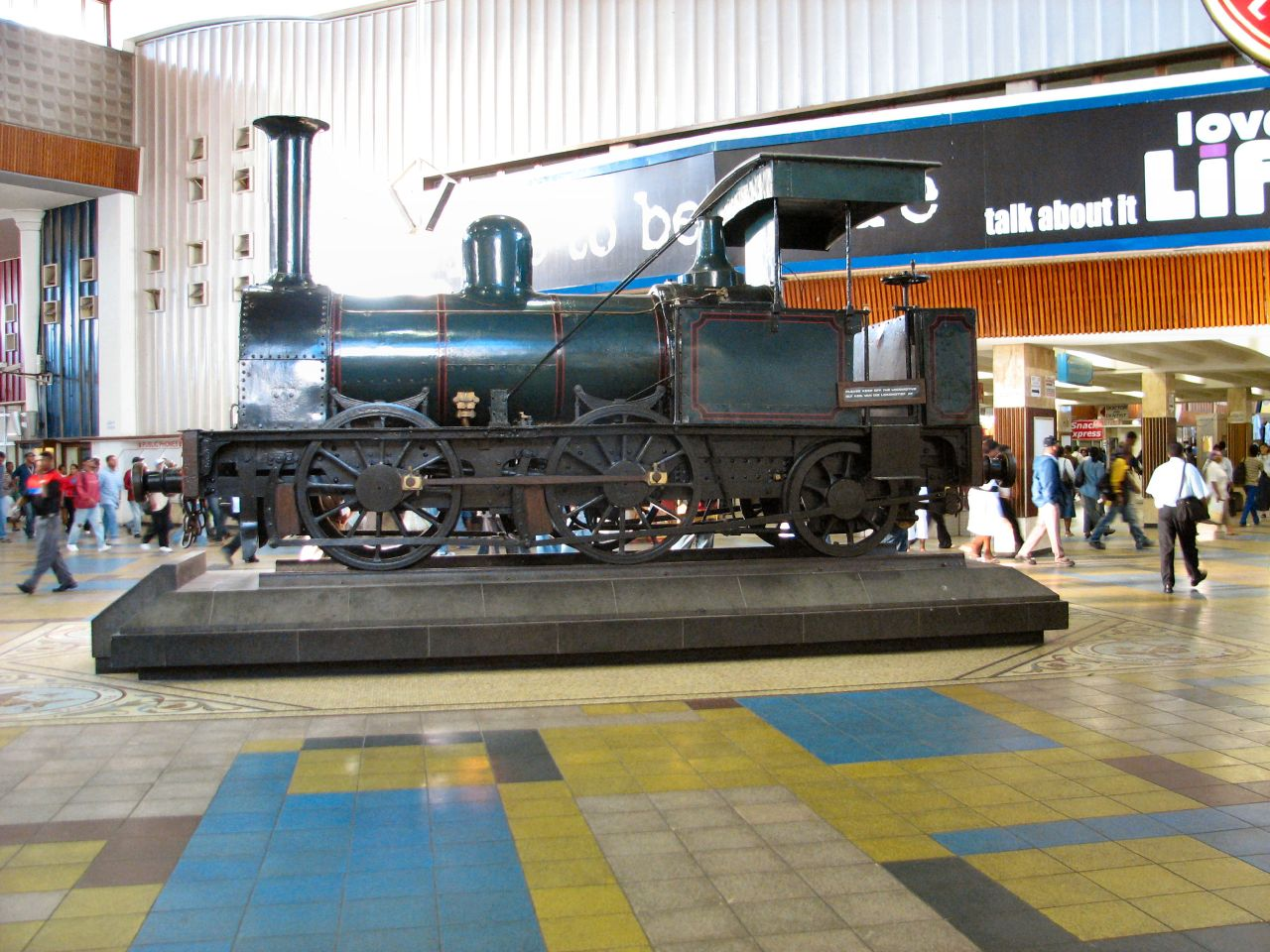
Blackie, the first locomotive in South Africa, previously displayed at Cape Town Station

Cape Town railway station is the main railway station of the city of Cape Town, South Africa. It is located along Adderley and Strand Streets, in the city's central business district (CBD).

== Lines ==
=== Metrorail lines ===
Cape Town station is the hub of the Metrorail Western Cape commuter rail network, which is operated by the Metrorail division of the Passenger Rail Agency of South Africa (PRASA). The network consists of four lines, all of which originate from Cape Town: the Southern Line via the Southern Suburbs to Simon's Town; the Cape Flats Line via Athlone to Retreat; the Central Line via Langa to Mitchell's Plain, Khayelitsha and Bellville; and the Northern Line via Bellville to Paarl, Stellenbosch and Somerset West.

=== Shosholoza Meyl ===
Shosholoza Meyl, the inter-city rail division of PRASA, operates several long-distance passenger rail services from Cape Town: a daily service to and from Johannesburg via Kimberley; a weekly service to and from Durban via Kimberley, Bloemfontein and Pietermaritzburg; and a weekly service to and from East London. These trains terminate at Cape Town station, as well as making a brief stop at Bellville.

Shosholoza Meyl also operates a semi-luxury Premier Classe service from Cape Town: weekly trains to and from Johannesburg via Kimberley.

=== Other ===
Cape Town Railway Station is also used by the luxury tourist-oriented Blue Train and the private train holiday company Rovos Rail.

== Services ==
Trains do not normally operate on a Sunday or a public holiday.

Preceding station	Metrorail Western Cape	Following station
Terminus	Northern Line services via Monte Vista	Esplanade towards Bellville
Terminus	Central Line services via Mutual	Esplanade towards Kapteinsklip, Chris Hani or Bellville
Terminus	Northern Line services via Mutual	Woodstock towards Wellington, Muldersvlei or Strand
Terminus	Central Line services via Pinelands	Woodstock towards Kapteinsklip, Chris Hani or Bellville
Terminus	Cape Flats Line	Woodstock towards Retreat
Terminus	Southern Line	Woodstock towards Simon's Town
Preceding station	Shosholoza Meyl	Following station
Bellville towards Johannesburg	Johannesburg–Cape Town	Terminus
Terminus	Cape Town–East London	Bellville towards East London
Preceding station	Premier Classe	Following station
Worcester towards Johannesburg	Johannesburg–Cape Town	Terminus

== History and alterations ==
=== The first structure ===
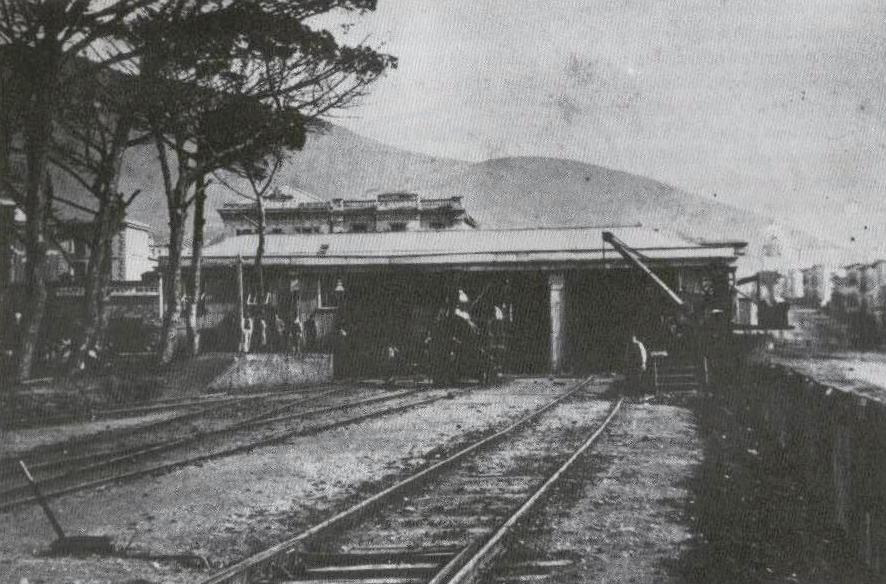
Cape Town's first railway station, circa 1870

The first railway station in Cape Town was a rudimentary wooden structure built in 1861, and was located on the site of the present Golden Acre shopping centre. Cape Town's railways were in their infancy and the early station was small and simple.

=== The Victorian building ===
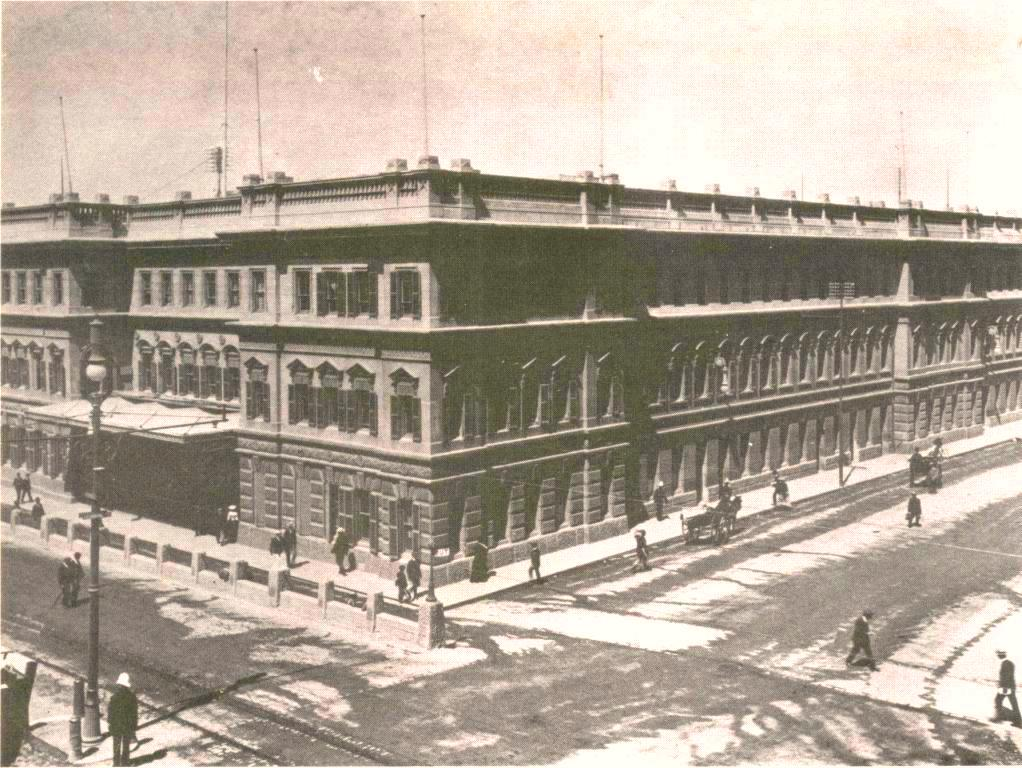
Cape Town's second station, circa 1900

In 1876 Cape Prime Minister John Molteno began construction of a new station on the same site, to serve as the central station to the rapidly-expanding railway network being built. It was large enough to contain the increasing number of train platforms and the headquarters of the recently formed Cape Government Railways, but additional enlargements were nonetheless added over the coming years.

The station complex expanded over the years, to include goods stations and other facilities on a large tract of land between Strand Street and the shore.

=== The current station ===
The present station was built on the site of the former goods station in the early 1960s. The old station building continued to be used for a few more years, until it was demolished in 1969. The vacant site was dubbed "the golden acre", and a shopping centre of that name was built there in the late 1970s.

The current station complex is the result of alterations due to the preparations for the 2010 Soccer World Cup. Like its predecessor it covers between 25 and 35 city blocks. The renovations are a joint initiative between PRASA-Metrorail and Intersite, the property management company.. The immediate emphasis was on improving the look and feel as well as commuter comfort, with better access, information, safety and security ahead of the 2010 soccer World Cup.

== Notable places nearby ==
Cape Town station is the only one in the CBD, so it is the nearest station to all the places of interest in the area. In the immediate vicinity of the station can be found:

- Cape Town City Hall
- Cape Town Civic Centre
- Artscape Theatre Centre
- The Grand Parade
- Castle of Good Hope

== See also ==
- Cape Government Railways
- Metrorail Western Cape
- Passenger Rail Agency of South Africa
- Cape Town CBD
