= Metrorail Western Cape =

Commuter rail system in the City of Cape Town and surrounds

- Official logo

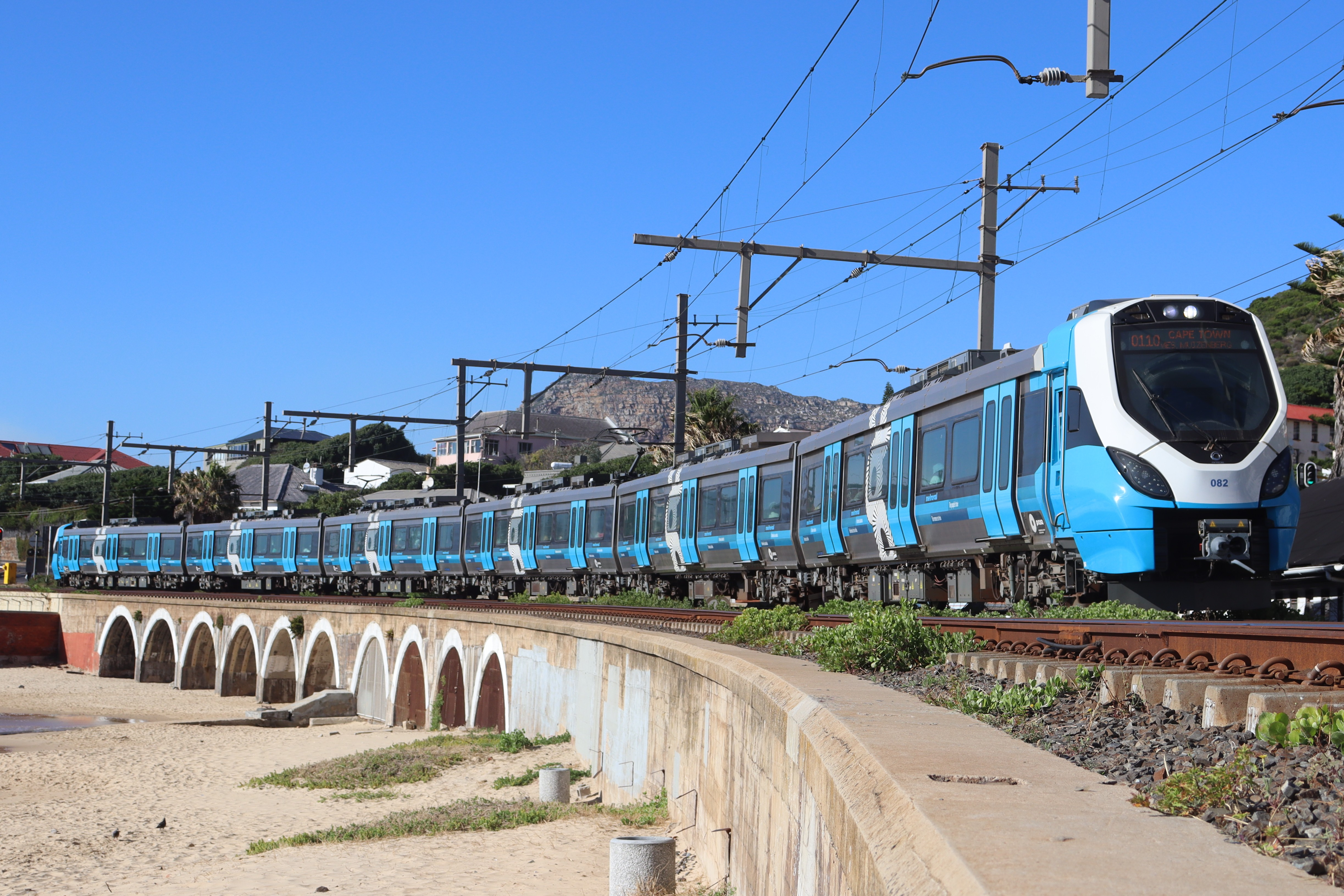
- A Metrorail X'Trapolis Mega train running near Kalk Bay station.

Overview
- Owner: PRASA
- Locale: City of Cape Town; Drakenstein; Stellenbosch; Swartland
- Transit type: Commuter rail
- Number of lines: 5
- Number of stations: As of March 2026: Operational: 109; Total: 121
- Annual ridership: 39.75 million FY2025–26
- Chief executive: Raymond Maseko (Regional Manager)
- Website: prasa.com

Operation
- Operator: Metrorail
- Character: Suburban railway
- Rolling stock: 78 X'Trapolis Mega; Class 5M2A; Class 10M3
- Number of vehicles: 85 trainsets (1,094 coaches)

Technical
- System length: 460 km (290 mi)
- Track gauge: 1,067 mm (3 ft 6 in)
- Electrification: 3 kV DC overhead catenary
- Top speed: 90 km/h (56 mph)
System map
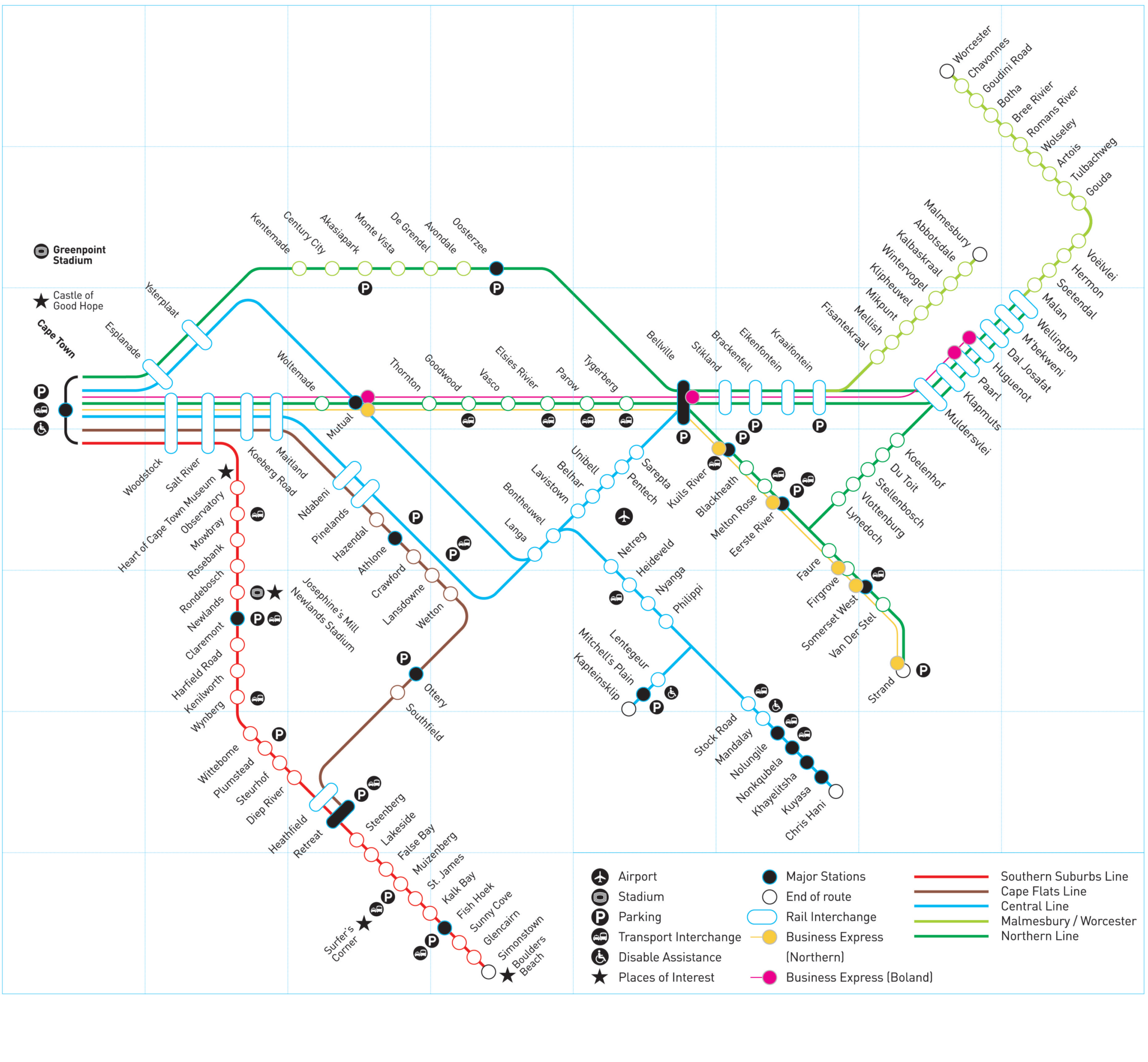

Metrorail Western Cape is a commuter rail system operating in the Cape Town metropolitan area and surrounds, in the Western Cape province of South Africa. The system operates as a division of the national PRASA, and forms part of the broader national Metrorail network.

The system serves the City of Cape Town, Drakenstein, Stellenbosch, and Swartland. It connects central Cape Town with areas such as Malmesbury, Paarl, Stellenbosch, Wellington, Strand, Mitchells Plain, Khayelitsha, and Simon’s Town. Some areas, including the Atlantic Seaboard, Durbanville, and parts of Blouberg do not have rail access.

Annual ridership totaled 39.75 million passengers for the 2025/26 financial year.

== History ==
=== Push for direct management in Cape Town ===
In 2017, the City of Cape Town suggested that it be allowed to directly manage the local Metrorail network. This followed years of decline in passenger numbers while the system was managed by the national Passenger Rail Agency of South Africa (PRASA). The City criticized PRASA's management of what it said was the foundation of Cape Town's public transit system.

An investigation into the feasibility of the city running the local rail network instead of PRASA found that the City could not only return the rail service to 2012 passenger levels, but could also build new lines and provide around 54,000 new housing units on vacant or underutilized land around the city's 92 train stations. The City also said it could properly manage the 48 hectares of leasable land that was managed by PRASA, and turn them into economic hubs.

As rail service quality continued to decline under the network's management by PRASA, the City of Cape Town's push for direct management of the system within its jurisdiction continued to increase. Indicative of the system's decline, the total number of trips operated by PRASA in Cape Town on an average weekday decreased from 444 in 2019 to 153 in 2022 (a 65.5% decline in three years).

In April 2022, Mayor of Cape Town Geordin Hill-Lewis announced that the National Treasury had given its support for a feasibility study into the City of Cape Town managing its own Metrorail network. Hill-Lewis noted the significant decline in PRASA rail services, highlighting the fact that the total number of train sets in operation had declined from 95 in 1995 to just 33 in 2020.

The Mayor confirmed that a tender had been issued by the City to operate the Metrorail system within the metro's jurisdiction. He further stated that the Constitution of South Africa supported the city's push to manage its own rail network. Hill-Lewis noted that the Constitution states that a municipality must be assigned a function when there is adequate capacity at the municipal level to perform said function, and when there is an agreement between the national and local governments. The Mayor called this "functional federalism".

A plan for the City of Cape Town metropolitan municipality to directly manage the Cape Town Metrorail network was formally submitted to the City Council in December 2024.

A Rail Business Plan for devolving Cape Town's Metrorail management from PRASA was approved by the City Council in December 2025. Devolution would depend on funding from the National Treasury. If the City was to succeed with its plan, it would become the first metro in South Africa to directly manage its own passenger rail network.

=== Approval for devolution ===
In April 2026, as part of its National Rail Master Plan, the South African Department of Transport announced that it would be allowing the devolution of commuter rail service management to municipalities. Should the draft policy be approved, a national devolution strategy would guide the process, and metros would be able to expand and maintain their own Metrorail networks. The move was welcomed by Cape Town Mayor Geordin Hill-Lewis.

== Network ==
Interactive Map

As of March 2026, 109 Metrorail Western Cape stations are operational, out of a total of 121. The system covers about 460 km of track. It operates on a 1,067 mm narrow gauge and uses 3 kV DC overhead electrification. All services either commence or terminate at the main Cape Town station in the centre of the city, which has 24 platforms.

=== Stations ===
Metrorail Western Cape Lines
Line name	Stations
Cape Flats Line	16
Central Line	33
Malmesbury Line	20
Northern Line	48
Southern Line	28

=== Cape Flats Line ===
The Cape Flats Line travels east from Cape Town as far as Maitland, then turns south through Athlone, rejoining the Southern Line at Heathfield. The service terminates at Retreat.

=== Central Line ===
The Central Line serves areas to the southeast of the city centre. Trains run from Cape Town to Langa on two different routes, one around the southern side and the other around the eastern side of Pinelands. From Langa they travel on one of three lines, going either to Mitchell's Plain, to Khayelitsha, or through Belhar to Bellville.

=== Northern Line ===
The Northern Line serves the northern suburbs of Cape Town as well as some outlying towns. Some trains travel from Cape Town station to Bellville along the old main line through Salt River, Maitland, Goodwood and Parow, while others travel along the relief main line via Century City. After Bellville, trains run on one of three routes: through Kraaifontein and Paarl to Wellington; via Kuils River and Stellenbosch to Muldersvlei; or Kuils River and Somerset West to Strand.

=== Regional Routes ===
There are also two longer-distance trains stopping at all stations en route daily. One along the main line to Worcester and at 174 km (108 mi) the longest possible route on a commuter train in South Africa. The other is the only diesel-hauled commuter train in the Western Cape to Malmesbury which travels 78 km (48 mi) on the route to Bitterfontein.

=== Southern Line ===
The Southern Line travels from central Cape town through the Southern Suburbs to Muizenberg, and then along the edge of False Bay to Simon's Town. Although Simon's Town is the southern terminus, many trains terminate at Fish Hoek because the line south of Fish Hoek is single-track.

== Operation ==
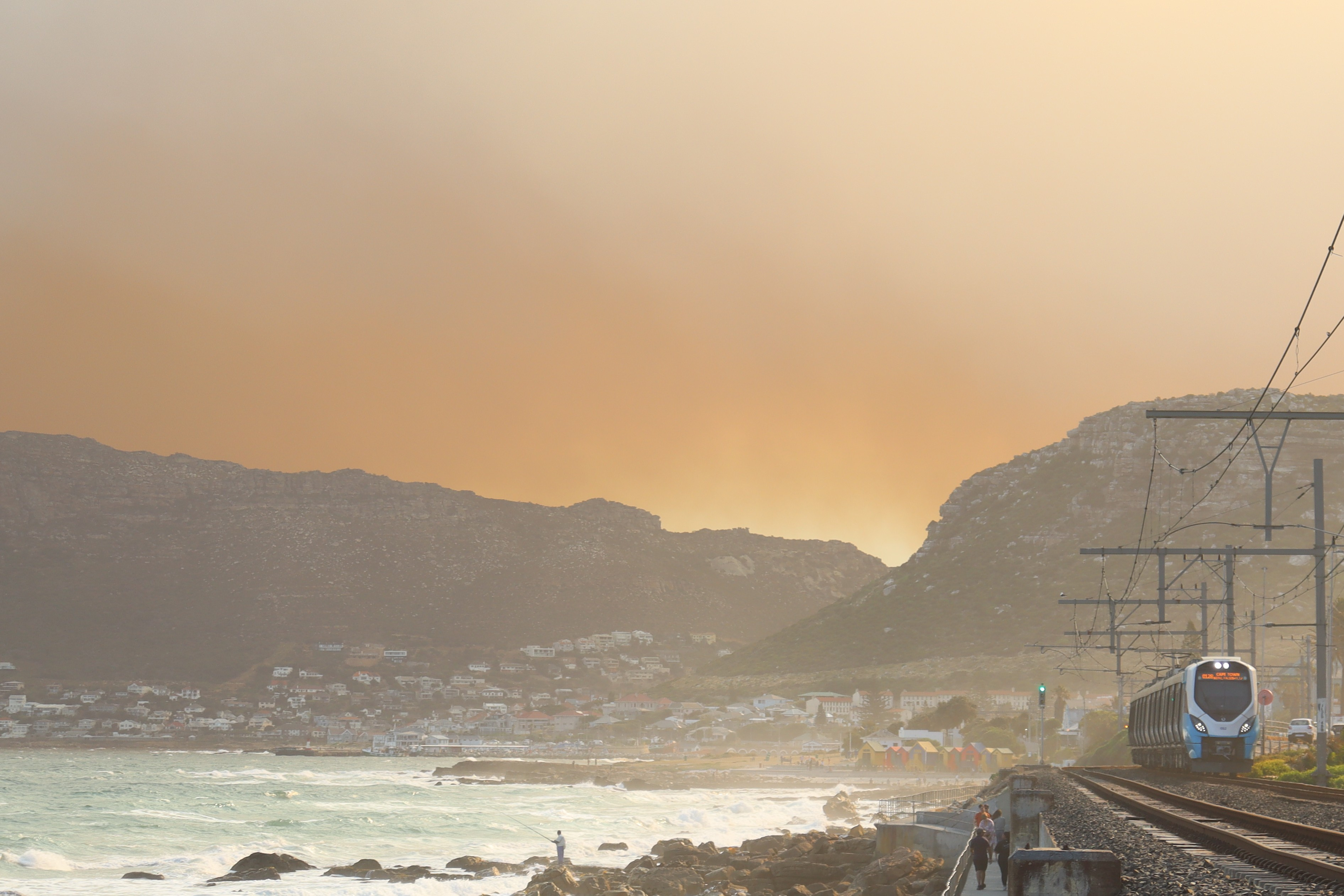
Metrorail Western Cape X'trapolis Mega heading northward, along the coast, on the Southern Line. The suburb of Fish Hoek, in the False Bay region of Cape Town, can be seen in the background

As of June 2026, the frequency of trains vary from every 15 minutes at weekday peaks to about 1 hour at weekend off-peaks. Lines operating on a singe railway track run less frequently with a train about every hour. Trains do not operate on Sundays.

Line	Train no. (Note: xx: Even number - Towards Cape Town; Odd Number - Away from Cape Town)	Route	Notes
Southern	01xx	Fish Hoek/Simon’s Town ↔ Cape Town	Extends to/from Simon’s Town at 60/75 minute intervals.
Southern	02xx	Simon's Town ↔ Fish Hoek	Simon's Town shuttle
Cape Flats	05xx	Retreat ↔ Cape Town (via Pinelands)	
Northern	23xx	Eersterivier ↔ Cape Town (via Monte Vista/Salt River)	Operates in the early morning
Northern	25xx	Kraaifontein ↔ Cape Town (via Salt River)	
Northern	26xx	Kraaifontein ↔ Cape Town (via Monte Vista)	Extents to/from Malmesbury twice a day, during peak hours.
Northern	~~27xx~~	~~Bellville ↔ Cape Town~~; ~~(via Salt River)~~	Not Operating
Northern	28xx	Bellville ↔ Cape Town (via Monte Vista)	
Northern	32xx	Strand ↔ Bellville/Cape Town (via Salt River)	Most trains operate to/from Cape Town, with a few running via Monte Vista.
Northern	34xx	Du Toit ↔ Cape Town (via Eersterivier)	First/last train start/end at Bellville
Northern	35xx	Wellington ↔ Cape Town (via Kraaifontein)	First/last train start/end at Bellville
Central	90xx	Bellville ↔ Mutual (via Langa)	
Central	94xx	Nolungile ↔ Cape Town (via Mutual)	
Central	95xx	Kapteinsklip ↔ Cape Town (via Pinelands)	
Central	99xx	Chris Hani ↔ Cape Town (via Mutual)	
Notes: Source: PRASA

== Infrastructure and rolling stock ==
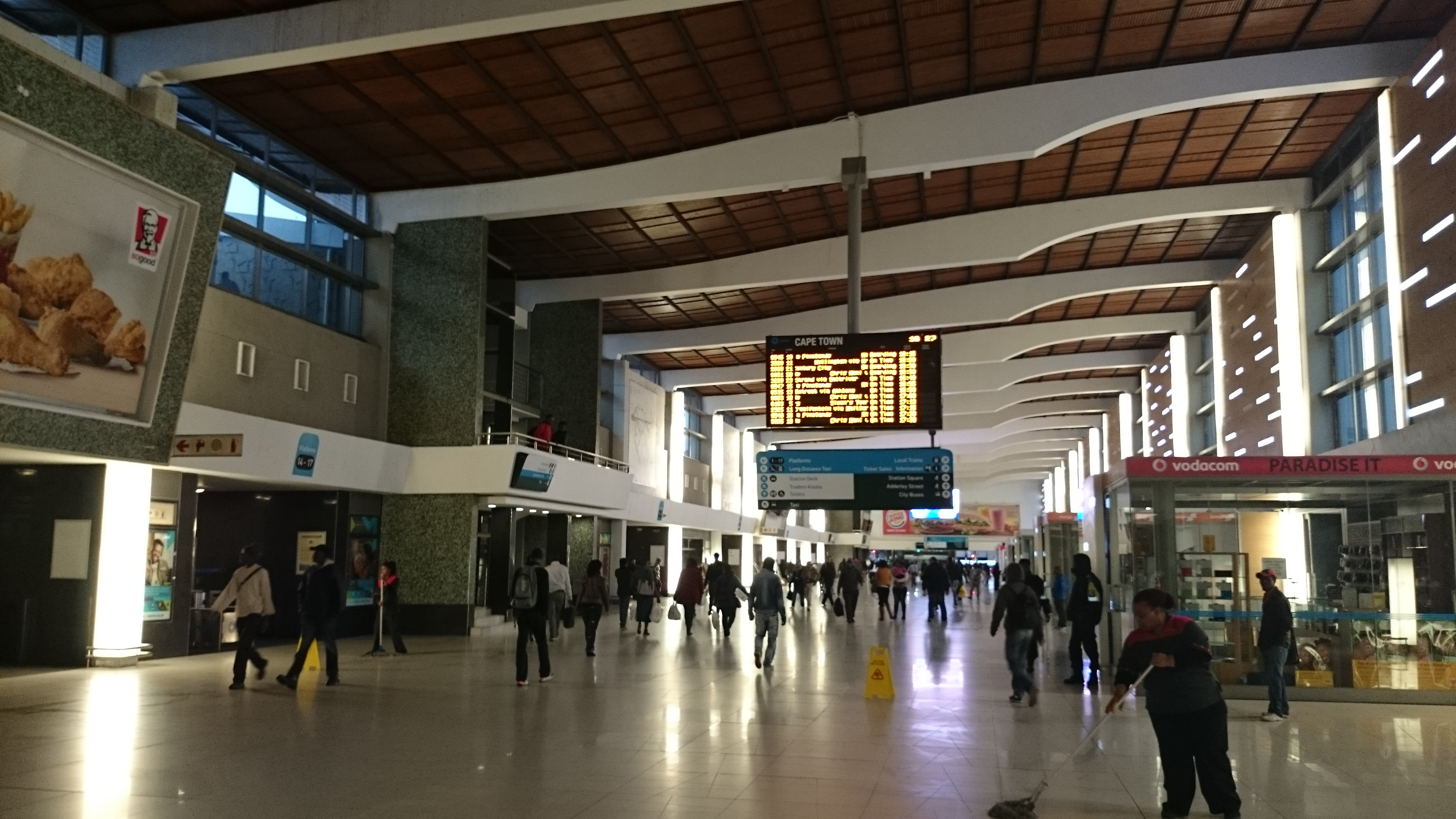
Cape Town station after renovations

In 2013, PRASA signed a R51 billion contract with Alstom to supply 600 X’Trapolis Mega trainsets, with local production included. Older rolling stock (Class 5M2) is being phased out. By March 2025, 72 X’Trapolis Mega sets operate in the Western Cape.

Existing infrastructure (2018):

- 121 stations (132 including halts)
- 489 km of railway track
- 10400 ha of reserve land
- 70 level crossings
- 320 km of demarcated rail reserve
- 96 bridges
- 19 foot bridges
- 380 culverts
- 9 km of sea walls

== Incidents ==
- 13 November 2006 – A train hit a truck stalled on an unprotected level crossing. The truck was carrying at least 33 farmworkers; nineteen were killed and six were injured.
- 25 August 2010 – A train hit a minibus taxi that had allegedly driven around the boom barriers on a level crossing. The minibus was carrying fourteen schoolchildren, of whom ten were killed.
- 20 October 2015 – Western Cape Metrorail reported this morning that four motor coaches and six carriages were destroyed in a fire in the early hours of Tuesday.
- 15 April 2016 – Trains set alight at Woodstock and Kraaifontein.
- July 2016 – Robbery and murder of train driver at Netreg station.
- 7 August 2016 – Two Metrorail trains set alight and burned at the Retreat station in Cape Town on Sunday afternoon.
- 1 December 2016 – Metrorail has had yet another one of its trains damaged. This time one was set alight at Thornton station late on Thursday evening.
- 12 June 2017 – Two trains were gutted by fire at Cape Town station.
- 20 November 2017 – Train set alight Century City
- 27 April 2018 – A train hit a bakkie (pick-up truck), killing all 7 people on board. This incident happened in the same place where the 2010 minibus incident occurred, i.e. Blackheath level crossing.
- 22 May 2018 – 4 carriages were burnt
- 30 May 2018 – 2 carriages were set alight - one person was killed and three injured.
- 18 June 2018 – 3 train carriages were burnt on the Southern Line. The fire began mid-afternoon at Steenberg station.
- 24 June 2018 – "At about 19:20 on the 24th June 2018 City Fire and Rescue Services responded in Radu Road in Philippi where three railway carriages were alight"
- 21 July 2018 – Seven coaches, as well as two motor coaches and five trailers were destroyed by a fire. "The estimated cost of the damaged coaches is approximately R30m."
- 26 July 2018 – Five carriages, and overhead power cables were damaged at Retreat station.
- 21 April 2019 – Two trains were set on fire at Cape Town station.
- 15 January 2020 – A train carriage was set alight at Retreat station.
- 25 January 2020 – 6 carriages and a motor coach went up in flames between Kentemade and Century City stations on the Northern Line.
- 11 February 2025 – An electrical fault led to a fire on the Central Line near Nolungile and Mandalay.
- 11 March 2025 – 10 carriages that were previously torched got set alight between Cape Town and Woodstock stations.

== See also ==
- Transport in South Africa
