= List of Metrorail Western Cape stations =

The following is a list of stations served by Metrorail Western Cape, compiled from timetables and official sources. The Metrorail Western Cape network consists of four main lines: the Cape Flats, Central, Northern, and Southern, along with a limited service on the Malmesbury Line.

== List of stations ==
The table below uses a coloured bar on the left of each station name to indicate its primary line. Line colours

Line	Colour
Southern Line	Red
Central Line	Light Blue
Northern Line	Green
Cape Flats Line	Brown
Malmesbury Line	Orange
Multiple / All lines	Light Grey

Station	Image	Line(s)	Notes
Cape Town railway station		All (terminus)	Main hub with 24 platforms
Abbotsdale railway station		Malmesbury	
Acacia Park railway station		Malmesbury, Northern	
Athlone railway station		Cape Flats	
Avondale railway station		Northern, Malmesbury	
Bellville railway station		Northern, Central, Malmesbury	Major interchange
Belhar railway station		Central	
Blackheath railway station		Northern	
Bonteheuwel railway station		Central	
Brackenfell railway station		Northern, Malmesbury	Park-and-ride
Century City railway station		Northern	
Chris Hani railway station		Central	Khayelitsha terminus
Claremont railway station		Southern	Park-and-ride
Crawford railway station		Cape Flats	
Dal Josafat railway station		Northern	
De Grendel railway station		Northern	
Diep River railway station		Southern	Park-and-ride
Du Toit railway station		Northern	
Eerste River railway station		Northern	Park-and-ride
Eikenfontein railway station		Northern, Malmesbury	
Elsies River railway station		Northern	
Esplanade railway station		Northern, Central	
False Bay railway station		Southern	
Firgrove railway station		Northern	
Fisantkraal railway station		Malmesbury	
Fish Hoek railway station		Southern	Park-and-ride; frequent terminus
Glencairn railway station		Southern	
Goodwood railway station		Northern	
Harfield Road railway station		Southern	
Hazendal railway station		Cape Flats	
Heathfield railway station		Southern, Cape Flats	Junction, Park-and-ride
Heideveld railway station		Central	
Huguenot railway station		Northern	Paarl area
Kalk Bay railway station		Southern	
Kapteinsklip railway station		Central	Mitchell's Plain terminus
Kenilworth railway station		Southern	Park-and-ride
Kentemade railway station		Northern	
Khayelitsha railway station		Central	
Klapmuts railway station		Northern	
Klipheuwel railway station		Malmesbury	
Koeberg Road railway station		Multiple	Shared
Koelenhof railway station		Northern	Closed since 2020
Kraaifontein railway station		Northern, Malmesbury	Park-and-ride
Kuyasa railway station		Central	
Kuils River railway station		Northern	Park-and-ride
Lakeside railway station		Southern	
Langa railway station		Central	
Lansdowne railway station		Cape Flats	Park-and-ride
Lentegeur railway station		Central	
Lyndedoch railway station		Northern	
Maitland railway station		Multiple	Shared junction
Malmesbury railway station		Malmesbury	Limited service terminus
Mandalay railway station		Central	
Mbekweni railway station		Northern	
Mellish railway station		Malmesbury	
Melton Rose railway station		Northern	
Mitchells Plain railway station		Central	
Monte Vista railway station		Northern	Park-and-ride
Mowbray railway station		Southern	
Muizenberg railway station		Southern	Park-and-ride
Mutual railway station		Central, Northern	
Ndabeni railway station		Cape Flats, Central	
Netreg railway station		Central	
Newlands railway station		Southern	
Nolungile railway station		Central	
Nonkqubela railway station		Central	
Observatory railway station		Southern	
Oosterzee railway station		Northern, Malmesbury	Park-and-ride
Ottery railway station		Cape Flats	Park-and-ride
Paarden Eiland railway station		Central, Northern	
Parow railway station		Northern	
Paarl railway station		Northern	
Pentech railway station		Central	
Philippi railway station		Central	
Pinelands railway station		Cape Flats, Central	
Plumstead railway station		Southern	Park-and-ride
Retreat railway station		Southern, Cape Flats	Park-and-ride
Rondebosch railway station		Southern	
Rosebank railway station		Southern	
Salt River railway station		Multiple	Major shared junction
Sarepta railway station		Central, Northern	
Simon's Town railway station		Southern	Southern terminus
Somerset West railway station		Northern	
Southfield railway station		Cape Flats	
St. James railway station		Southern	
Steenberg railway station		Southern	
Stellenbosch railway station		Northern	
Steurhof railway station		Southern	
Stikland railway station		Northern	
Stock Road railway station		Central	
Sunny Cove railway station		Southern	
Thornton railway station		Northern	
Tygerberg railway station		Northern	
Unibell railway station		Central	
Van der Stel railway station		Northern	
Vasco railway station		Northern	
Vlottenburg railway station		Northern	
Wellington railway station		Northern	
Wetton railway station		Cape Flats	
Wintevogel railway station		Malmesbury	
Wittebome railway station		Southern	
Woodstock railway station		Multiple	Shared early station
Wynberg railway station		Southern	
Ysterplaat railway station		Central, Northern	
