= Steenberg =

Steenberg may refer to:

- Steenberg, Cape Town, a small community in South Africa
  - Steenberg railway station
- Steenberg Estate, a hotel, vineyard and golf course in Cape Town
- Steenberg (surname)
