= Ronald Harrison =

South African artist

- Born: 18 March 1940; Athlone, Cape Town
- Died: 28 June 2011 (aged 71); Cape Town, South Africa
- Occupation: Artist
- Parent(s): William and Jeanette Harrison

Ronald Harrison (18 March 1940 – 28 June 2011) was a South African artist most well known for his thought provoking 1962 painting Black Christ.

== Life ==
Harrison was born on 18 March 1940 to Jeanette and William Harrison in Athlone and he always showed a talent for art. At the age of eight he was on his father's shoulders when the crowd he was in received a baton charge from the local police who objected to their politics. He joined Alexander Sinton Secondary School in [Athlone ] of Cape Town in 1954 where he was taught painting.

In 1962, during South Africa's apartheid era, his most famous work, Black Christ, was unveiled at St Luke's Church in the Cape Town suburb of Salt River. It depicted African National Congress leader Chief Albert Luthuli as Christ crucified, flanked by two Roman centurions, then National Party prime minister Hendrik Verwoerd and justice minister John Vorster.

As a result, he was arrested and tortured by the security police for seven days. The painting was smuggled to the United Kingdom after it was banned in South Africa. Black Christ toured Europe to raise funds for the International Defence and Aid Fund. A fund established in 1956 by John Collins, a priest from London, covered the legal expenses of those accused of treason by the apartheid regime.

The painting was returned in 1997.

Black Christ is currently stored at the South African National Gallery and a replica is on display at the offices of the Nelson Mandela Foundation.

Harrison had been treated for cancer in 2010 and had recovered. He died of a heart attack on 28 June 2011 at his niece's house in Mitchell's Plain. The church service was held in St Luke's Church in Salt River, Cape Town, where Black Christ was first exhibited.
