= Dillan Solomons =

South African soccer player

Personal information
- Full name: Dillan Peter Solomons
- Date of birth: 30 May 1996 (age 30)
- Place of birth: Steenberg, Cape Town
- Height: 1.68 m (5 ft 6 in)
- Position: Right-back

Team information
- Current team: Kaizer Chiefs
- Number: 18

Senior career*
Years	Team	Apps	(Gls)
2016–2017	Milano United	23	(3)
2017–2019	Royal Eagles	45	(7)
2019–2020	Stellenbosch	3	(9)
2020–2021	All Stars	26	(4)
2021–2022	Moroka Swallows	22	(4)
2022–	Kaizer Chiefs	51	(1)
- * Club domestic league appearances and goals as of 4 January 2026

Dillan Solomons (born 30 May 1996) is a South African soccer player who plays as a right-back for Kaizer Chiefs in the Premier Soccer League.

== Career ==
He hails from Steenberg. As a young player he also participated in athletics, namely sprints, long jump and triple jump. According to IOL, he was "arguably ... the fastest player in the league" in 2022. He recorded several placements between 5th and 8th at South African age-group championships, and finished 12th in the long jump at the 2016 South African Championships. Solomons managed to surpass the 7-metre barrier in the long jump by recording 7.06 metres in April 2016 in Germiston.

Solomons played one year for Milano United, then two years for Royal Eagles with whom he won promotion from the 2018-19 National First Division. Instead of contesting the 2019-20 South African Premier Division with the Royal Eagles, in July 2019 he moved to Stellenbosch Seeing very limited playing time, Solomons moved back to the second tier with All Stars before he was bought by Moroka Swallows as a replacement for left winger Kgaogelo Sekgota.

Solomons made his Premier Division breakthrough at Moroka Swallows. Manager Dylan Kerr converted him to right wing-back. Solomons was subsequently bought by Kaizer Chiefs in the summer of 2022. Sinky Mnisi, who was the CEO of Royal AM, made a minor stir by claiming that Royal AM already had agreed to buy the player from Swallows.

Solomons was a Kaizer Chiefs regular during late 2022, but then found himself more often on the bench and suffered a dislocated shoulder in January 2023. During the 2023–24 season, he largely fell out of use. By March 2024 Solomons had not yet started a single game. Reeve Frosler and then Zitha Kwinika were preferred in the right back position.

== Personal life ==
Solomons had his first child in 2023.
