= Belgravia High School =

Belgravia Secondary School

Location
- Veld Road, Belgravia Estate, Athlone, Cape Town, Cape Town; South Africa; 33.9721°S 18.5186°E

Information
- Motto: Work Ennobles
- Established: 21 January 1957
- Status: Open
- Principal: A.N. Buis
- Enrollment: 890
- Website: School site

Belgravia Secondary School, also known as Belgravia High School, is an English-medium school in Athlone, a suburb of Cape Town, South Africa.

== History ==
The school was founded by six people on 21 January 1957 when it was called the Athlone Secondary School No. 2. It was not until 1957 that it got the name of Belgravia and it took until 1959 before there were brick buildings.

During the Western Cape Youth Uprising of 1976 the students at both Alexander Sinton Secondary School and this school boycotted classes on 16 August during a period that saw marches, random acts of arson and battles between students and the police.

In September 1985, there were protests at and around many South African schools, which were segregated under the apartheid system. The area around Belgravia High School became a hotbed of activist activity, mostly involving local students. At one rally, they eerected at least 30 burning barricades and pushed for the release of Nelson Mandela. At one point the school was shuttered in an effort to stop the demonstrations, but they continued, and police used tear gas to disperse them. On 15 October 1985, police concealed themselves in a truck and then shot into a group of young anti-apartheid protesters from their vehicle. Three people were killed: Jonathan Claasen (21), Shaun Magmoed (15), and Michael Miranda (11). Over a dozen others were injured, and the event became known as the Trojan Horse Massacre. Although an inquest found the police had acted improperly, the Cape-Attorney General refused to prosecute and a civil case ultimately ended in an acquittal.
