= Paul Bell =

Paul Bell may refer to:

- Paul Bell (politician) (1950–2010), Iowa state representative from the 41st District
- Paul Bell (footballer) (1914–1945), Australian rules footballer
- Paul Bell (baseball) (born 1980), South African baseball infielder
- Paul Bell (rugby league) (born 1969), rugby league footballer of the 1990s and 2000s
- Paul Bell, a pseudonym used by English author Henry Chorley (1808–1872)
