= Crawford railway station =

Crawford railway station can refer to one of several railway stations:

- Crawford railway station (Cape Town), a Metrorail station in Cape Town, South Africa
- Crawford railway station (Scotland), a disused railway station in South Lanarkshire, Scotland, UK
