= Alexander Sinton Secondary School =

School in Athlone, Cape Town, South Africa

Location
- Thornton Road, Crawford; Athlone; South Africa
- Coordinates: 33.9759°S 18.5125°E

Information
- Motto: Vel Primus Vel Cum Primis ("If not the best, amongst the best")
- Established: 1951
- Founder: Alexander Sinton
- Status: Open
- Principal: Michael D Peterson
- Enrollment: 1,100
- Website: sintonhs.co.za

Alexander Sinton Secondary School, also known as Alexander Sinton High School, is an English-medium school in Athlone, a suburb of Cape Town, South Africa. The school is located in the Cape Flats, an area designated as non-white under the Group Areas Act during apartheid. The school was involved in the anti-apartheid student uprisings of the 1970s and 1980s. Staff and students at the school made headlines when they barricaded the police into their school in September 1985. The following month, three youths were killed near the school by police officers who opened fire on protesters in the Trojan Horse Incident. It was the first school to be visited by Nelson Mandela after his release from prison. As of 2014, the school has 1,100 pupils, half boys and half girls. The school employs 40 teachers and six non-teaching staff.

== Founder ==
The school was named for its benefactor Alexander Sinton, who bequeathed money to found the school in 1951.

== 1976 uprising ==
During the youth uprising of 1976 protesting the imposition of the Afrikaans language as a mandatory medium of instruction in schools, the students at the school and Belgravia High School nearby in Athlone boycotted classes on 16 August during a period that saw marches, random acts of arson and battles between students and the police. In 1976 Nabil ("Basil") Swart, a teacher at the school, was arrested after helping a student who had been shot during the protests. Swart was released on bail after being detained for a weekend.

== 1985 protests ==
Internal resistance to apartheid intensified, and a state of emergency was declared in parts of the country in 1985. The Committee of 81, a student organisation representing coloured schools in the Western Cape which organised student boycotts and protests, held some meetings at the school in 1985. The school effectively stopped teaching from February and was officially closed on 6 September when the government ordered more than 400 schools to close as a result of civil unrest. Some teachers resigned their positions and others were confused as to their role. The Teachers' League of South Africa, a professional association for coloured teachers, encouraged its members not to resign for the sake of the children. Teachers decided to teach, but not to co-operate with the authorities.

The school defiantly re-opened on 17 September 1985 when the principal, Khalied Desai, led teachers, uniformed students and parents who sang protest songs. The police were aware of the students' plans, and arrived quickly. The students threw stones, built barricades and the police replied with armoured vehicles, tear gas, rubber bullets and the arrests of nearly 200 people. Teachers and parents supported the students and their protests against injustice. After the arrests were made, the police were surprised to find that they themselves were effectively prisoners, as the exits from the school were blocked by vehicles brought there by protesters outside the school. The police had difficulty taking away the people they had arrested. The New York Times noted that the action taken by coloured teachers and students at the school was remarkably different to the boycotts taking place at black schools. Swart was again jailed for two weeks in 1985 for helping to re-open the school.

The state of emergency was extended to include Cape Town on 25 October 1985, giving the police and army greater powers to deal with instability in the area. Swart was again jailed for eighteen months in 1986 for his involvement in the school unrest.

=== Trojan Horse Incident ===
On 15 October 1985 three male youths, Michael Miranda (11), Shaun Magmoed (15) and Jonathan Claasen (21), were killed by the police nearby in Belgravia Road in Athlone in what was called the Trojan Horse Incident. In addition, 15 others, including 13 children and 2 adults, were wounded. Students and activists had gathered where they regularly had battles with the police and were stoning vehicles. Most of the people in the crowd were from the school. Police officers who had been hidden in crates on board the back of a truck opened fire on stone-throwing protesters. The police had deliberately provoked the protesters to allow them to shoot – the truck was driven down the same road twice as the police did not get the anticipated reaction the first time, i.e. stones being thrown at them. A CBS television crew witnessed and filmed the incident and images thereof were broadcast to the world.

An inquest found that the police had behaved "unreasonably", but despite a private prosecution no sentences were imposed on the people involved. A Truth and Reconciliation Commission hearing was held into the incident in 1997, after the end of the apartheid era. A memorial marks the spot where the incident took place. It shows a silhouette of the Trojan Horse vehicle and the people who shot the three young people. The memorial also officially includes graffiti sprayed on the fence that includes the message "Stop State Violence".

== Other controversies ==
In 2012, the then principal Fazil Parker was involved in a dispute with the Department of Basic Education after he was given late notice that his teachers needed to mark national exams. The teachers considered the request unreasonable and did not comply with it, resulting in Parker being summoned to a disciplinary hearing.

== Notable alumni ==
- Ronald Harrison, artist and activist who created the Black Christ painting banned in South Africa.
