= Athlone Power Station =

Defunct power station in Cape Town, South Africa

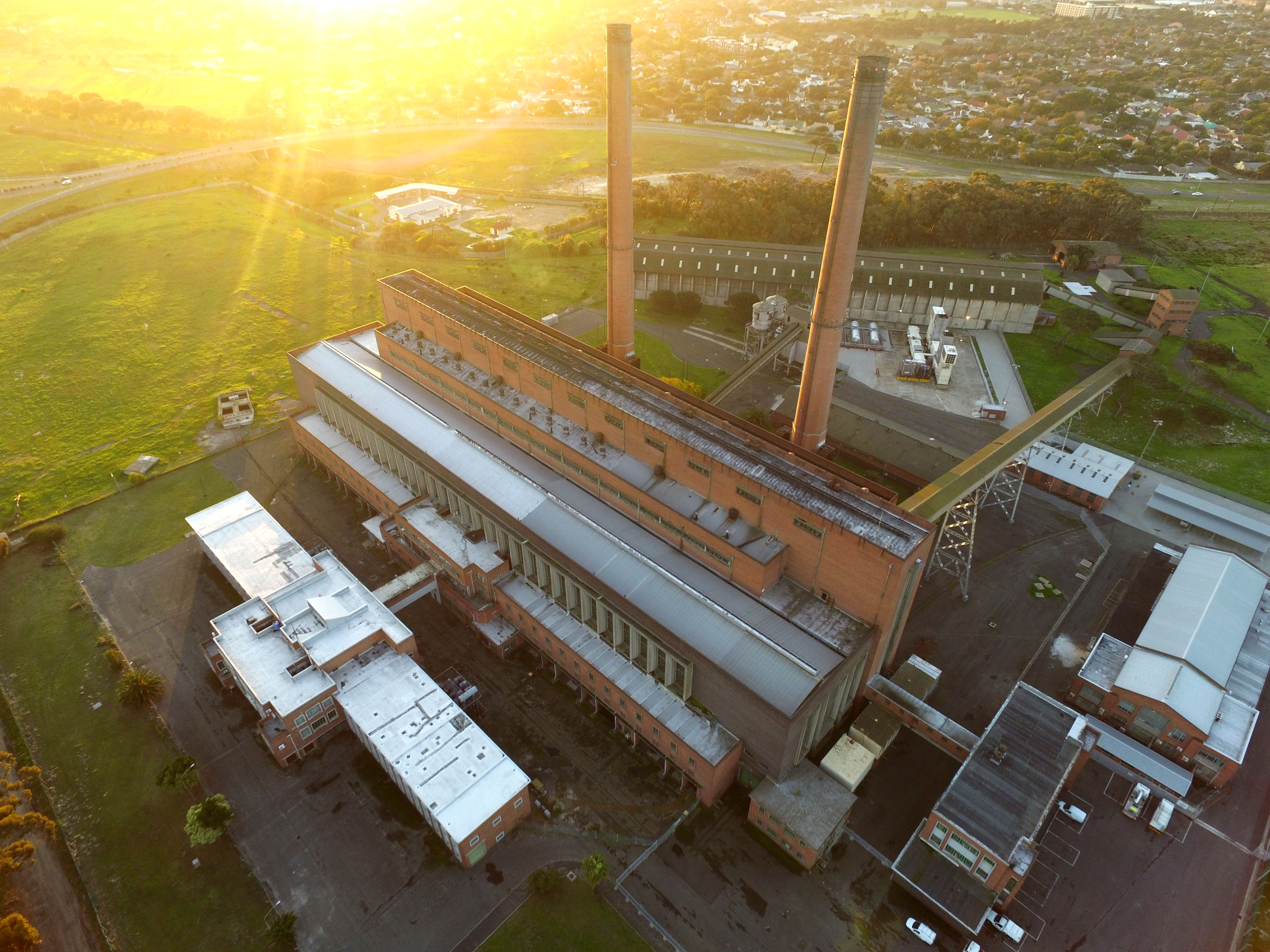
- Aerial view of the Power Station, after the demolition of the cooling towers
- Country: South Africa
- Location: Kewtown, Athlone, Cape Town
- Coordinates: 33°56′56″S 18°30′49″E
- Status: Decommissioned
- Commission date: 1962
- Decommission date: 2003
- Owner: City of Cape Town

Thermal power station
- Primary fuel: Coal
- Turbine technology: Steam turbine
- Cooling source: Reclaimed sewage

Power generation
- Units operational: 0 of 6
- Nameplate capacity: 180 MW

External links
- Commons: Related media on Commons

Athlone Power Station is a decommissioned coal-fired power station in Athlone, Cape Town, South Africa. The site stopped generating power in 2003 and was decommissioned. However, in 2021 plans were announced to re-use the site.

Athlone Power Station was situated on the N2 freeway into the city, consisted of a large brick generation building, two 99m brick chimneys, and two cooling towers, fed by reclaimed water from a nearby sewage plant. It was commissioned in 1962 with 6 turbines with a nominal capacity of 180 megawatts, and operated by the City of Cape Town. Between 1985 and 1994 the station was held on standby, but it resumed generating in 1995 with a reduced capacity of 120 MW. Between 1995 and 2003 it was used to generate power during peak demand periods or power failures of the national grid. By 2003, significant investment was required due to the age of the power station, so generation ended.

== Decommissioning ==
Athlone was the last coal-fired power station operating in Cape Town; the others, in the city centre and Salt River, were demolished in the 1980s and 1990s. The cost of transport means that coal costs three to five times more in Cape Town than it does near the mines inland, making it more economical to transmit power from there to Cape Town than to generate power in Cape Town from transported coal.

The lifespan of the station's two cooling towers had been extended in 1993 through the addition of reinforcing bands, but on 14 February 2010, the bands on one tower collapsed, leading the city to announce that the towers would be demolished by the end of April 2010 to prevent their collapse; the demolition was postponed to 22 August 2010 when they were finally demolished.

The power station building and two 99m high chimneys are still standing while the city decides on the future of the site.

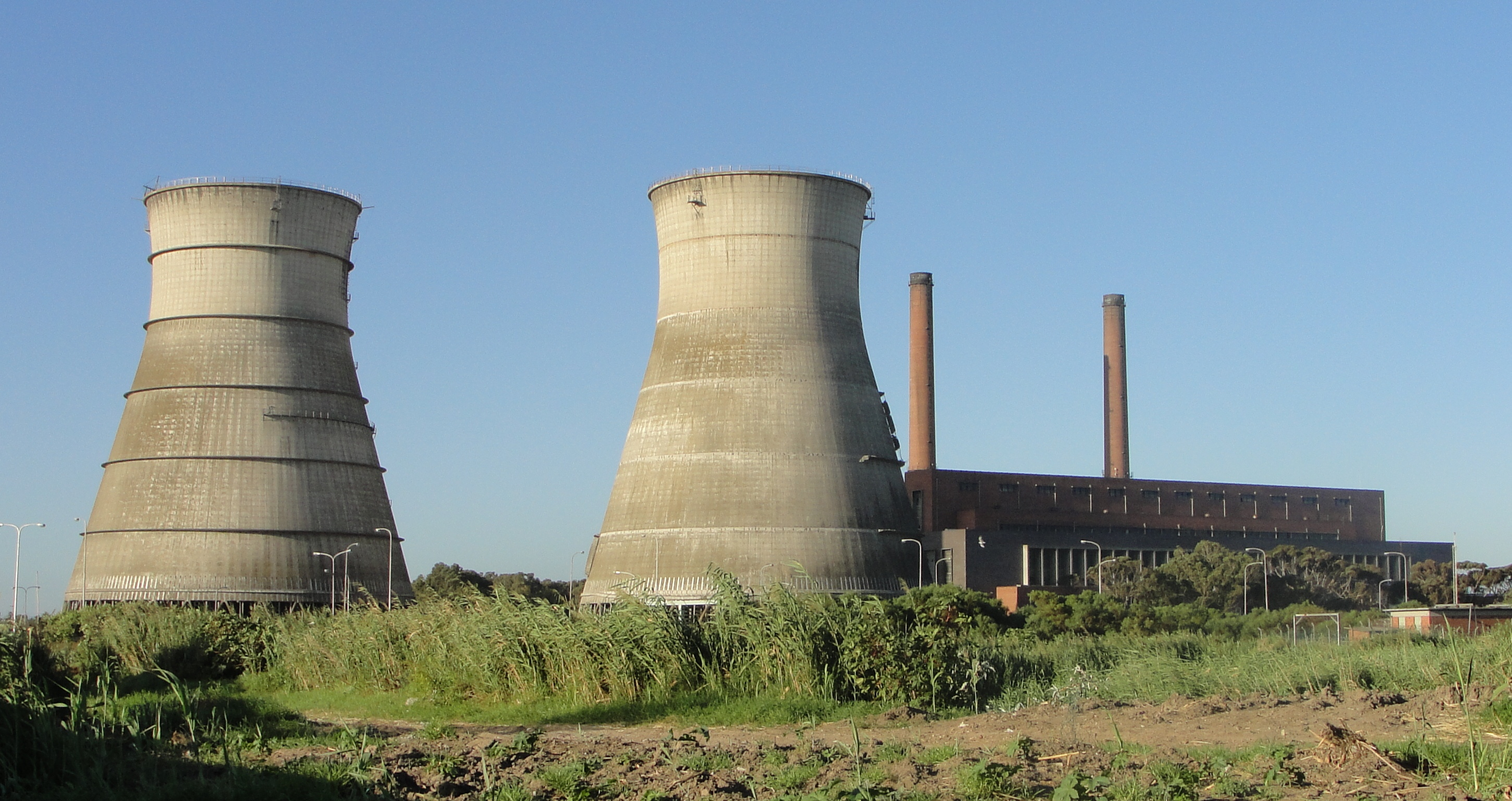
Image of the Power Station before the demolition of the cooling towers. The reinforcing bands on the right tower failed, necessitating the demolition of both towers on 22 August 2010.

Demolition of the cooling towers

== See also ==
- List of power stations in South Africa
