= Claremont railway station (Cape Town) =

Metrorail station in Cape Town, South Africa

Claremont
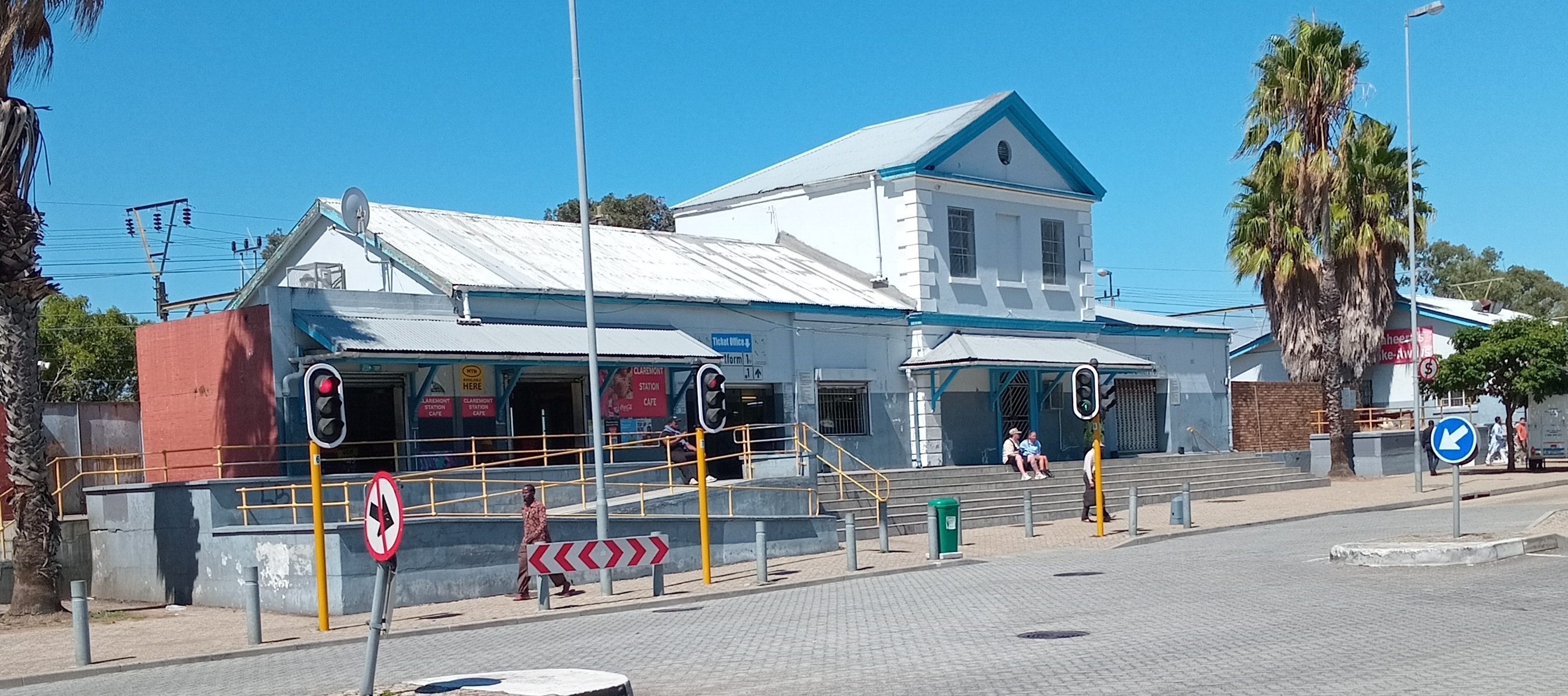
- The station in March 2026

General information
- Location: Claremont Boulevard, Claremont 7708; South Africa
- Coordinates: 33°58′54″S 18°28′01″E
- System: Metrorail station
- Owner: PRASA
- Line: Southern Line
- Platforms: 1 side platform, 1 island
- Tracks: 3
- Connections: Golden Arrow Bus Services; Minibus taxis UCT Jammie Shuttle

Construction
- Structure type: At-grade

Services
Preceding station	Metrorail Western Cape	Following station
Newlands towards Cape Town	Southern Line	Harfield Road towards Simon's Town
Location
- Location within Cape Town Location within South Africa

Claremont railway station is a Metrorail station on the Southern Line, serving the suburb of Claremont in Cape Town.

The station has two main tracks and an unused side track, served by a side platform and an island platform; the station building is at ground level on the western side of the tracks. Adjacent to the station is major bus station of the Golden Arrow Bus Services and a large minibus taxi rank.

The station opened in 1864 as part of the Cape Town-Wynberg line.

== Notable places nearby ==
- Claremont business district, including:
  - Cavendish Square
  - Stadium on Main
  - Palmyra Junction
- Villager Football Club
- Life Kingsbury Hospital
