= Wetton, Cape Town =

Wetton
- Interactive map of Wetton
- Coordinates: 34°1′S 18°33′E
- Country: South Africa
- Province: Western Cape
- Municipality: City of Cape Town

Area
  - Total: 0.74 km^{2} (0.29 sq mi)

Population (2011)
  - Total: 3,300
  - Density: 4,500/km^{2} (12,000/sq mi)
- Time zone: UTC+2 (SAST)
- Postal code (street): 7780

Wetton is a small suburb in Cape Town, South Africa, with a surface size of only 0,74 km^{2}. It is situated on the edge of the Southern Suburbs alongside the suburb of Lansdowne and Kenwyn.
