= Newlands railway station =

Cape Town Metrorail station on the Southern Line

Newlands Railway Station
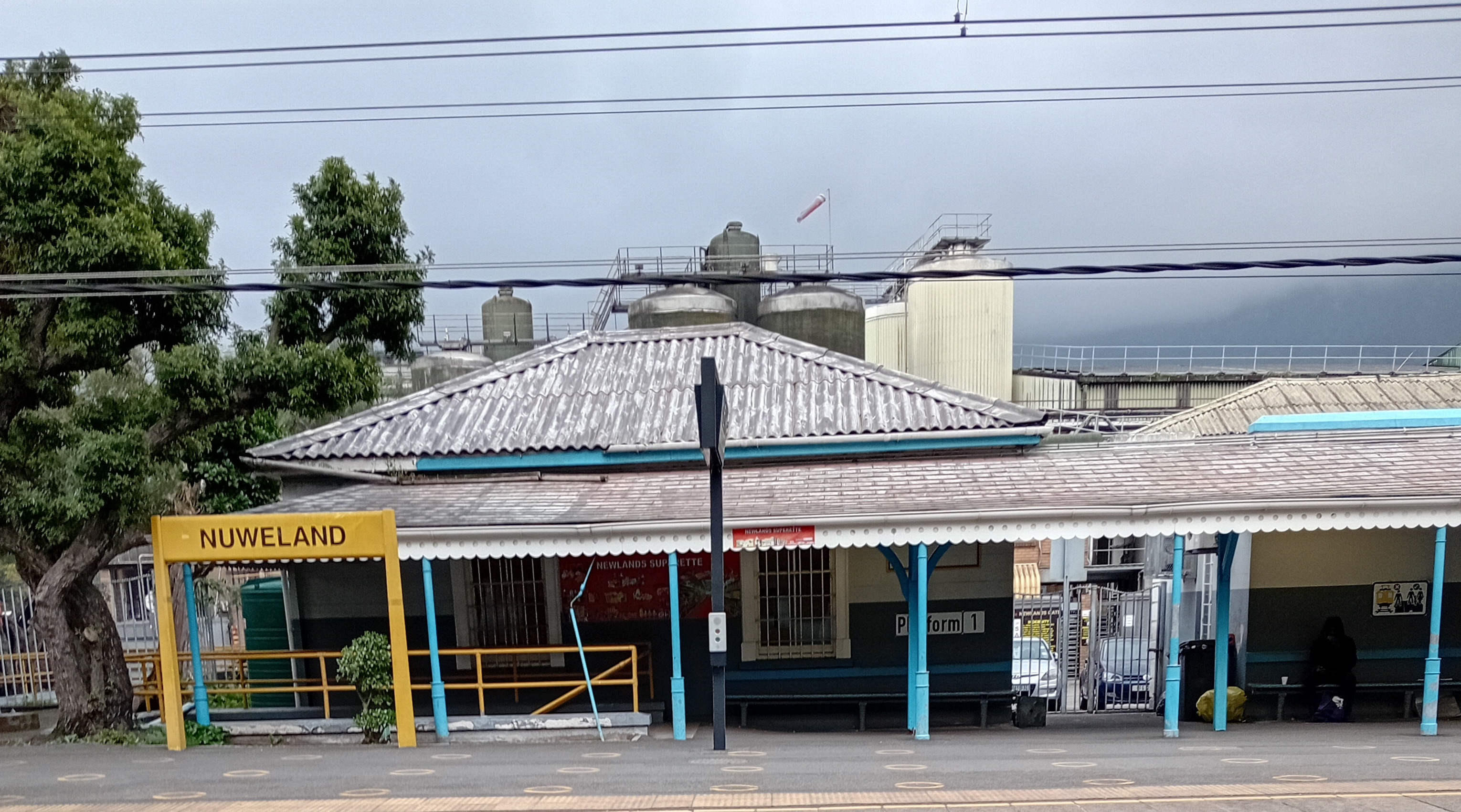

General information
- Location: Letterstedt Road, Newlands 7700, Cape Town; South Africa
- Coordinates: 33°58′27″S 18°28′3″E
- System: Metrorail station
- Owner: PRASA
- Line: Southern Line
- Platforms: 2 side platforms
- Tracks: 2

Construction
- Structure type: At-grade

Services
| Preceding station | Metrorail Western Cape | Following station |
|---|---|---|
| Rondebosch towards Cape Town | Southern Line | Claremont towards Simon's Town |
Location
- Location within Cape Town Location within South Africa

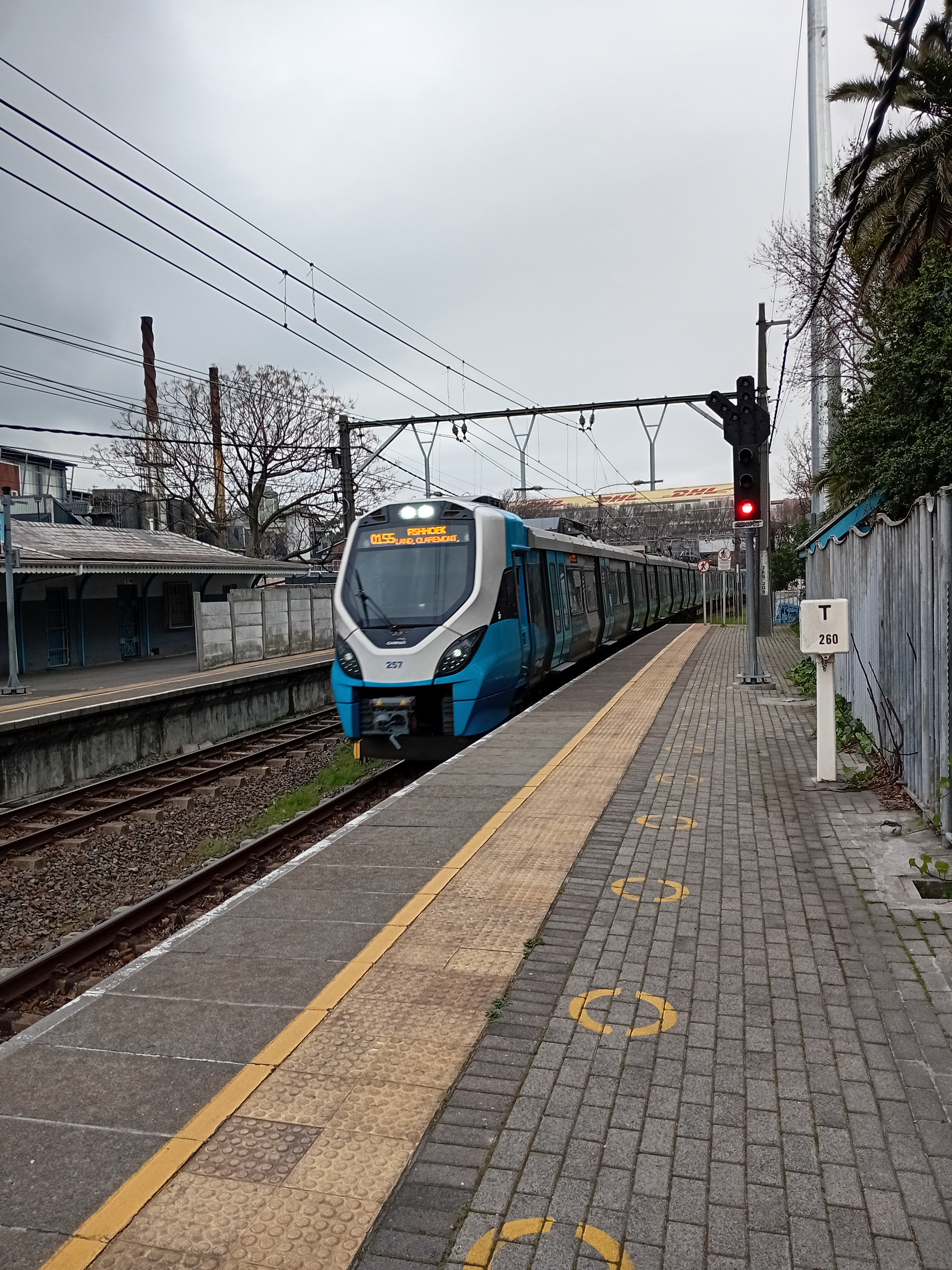
X'Trapolis Mega arriving at Newlands station, en route to Cape Town station

Newlands Railway Station is a commuter rail station on the Cape Town Metrorail Southern Line which serves the suburb of Newlands in Cape Town. The station is operated by PRASA as part of the Metrorail Western Cape network.

The station is located on Letterstedt Road in Newlands Positioned between Rondebosch (towards Cape Town) and Claremont (towards Simons Town).

It lies in walking distance of several key establishments, including:

- Newlands Stadium
- SA Sports Science Institute
- Newlands SAB Brewery
- Newlands Cricket Ground
- Newlands swimming pool
- South African College Schools
- Westerford High School

Station Layout

Newlands station is an at-grade station with two tracks, station building located on the Western half of the tracks and two side platforms.

Trains Serving

Newlands station is served by the X'trapolis Mega Electric Multiple Unit (EMU) Train. The trains were introduced in 2019 to phase out the older generation as a part of PRASA's recovery plan. Trains are most frequent during peak rush hours with scheduling on Google Maps and PRASA Website. The approximate travel time from Newlands Station to Cape Town Central Station is 15 minutes making it a desirable option for commuters looking to beat rush hour traffic.
