= Kenwyn, Cape Town =

Residential suburb of Cape Town, in Western Cape, South Africa

Kenwyn
- Location within Western Cape Location within South Africa
- Coordinates: 33°59′56″S 18°30′31″E
- Country: South Africa
- Province: Western Cape
- Municipality: City of Cape Town

Government
  - Councillor: Aslam Richards (Ward 60) (DA)
- Time zone: UTC+2 (SAST)
- Postal code (street): 7780
- PO box: 7790

Kenwyn is a residential suburb in the Southern Suburbs of Cape Town, South Africa. It lies south of the N2 and alongside the M5 freeway. The surrounding suburbs include Wetton, Rondebosch East and Kenilworth.

== History ==
The area was previously known as ‘’Rompvlei’’, which was itself a natural wetland forming part of the broader vlei system that also included Rondevlei and Zeekoevlei. The wetland was gradually drained and developed during the mid-20th century, leading to the establishment of the residential suburb now known as Kenwyn.

== Geography and community ==
Kenwyn is a suburp of Cape Town. It lies on sloping terrain between Kenilworth, ehich is at a higher elevation, and Lansdowne, which is lower. The suburb is mainly residential, with a mix of older houses and newer developments. features tree-lined residential streets, local parks, and a mix of older family homes and newer developments. Shopping centre nearby include Kenilworth Centre and Access Park.

== Education ==
=== Schools ===
- Kenwyn Primary School
- Oaklands High School
- Sunlands Primary School

== Sport ==
Chukker Road Sports Complex, in Kenwyn, is home to the Victoria Cricket Club, the Varsity Old Boys Baseball and Softball Club and the Lansdowne Eagles Baseball and Softball Club.

== See also ==
- Rondevlei Nature Reserve
- Cape Flats
- City of Cape Town
