= Steenberg railway station =

Metrorail station on the Southern Line

Steenberg
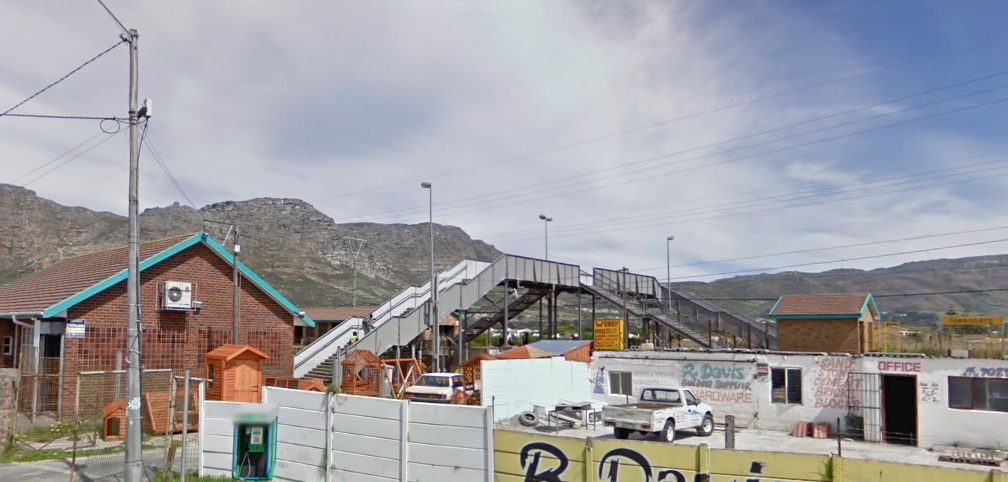

General information
- Location: Henley Road, Steenberg 7945, Cape Town; South Africa
- Coordinates: 34.0767°S 18.4637°E
- System: Metrorail station
- Owner: PRASA
- Line: Southern Line
- Platforms: island platform
- Tracks: 2
- Connections: Taxis on Retreat-Steenberg-Grassy Park route

Construction
- Structure type: At-grade
- Parking: approx. 50 spaces

Services
Preceding station	Metrorail Western Cape	Following station
Retreat towards Cape Town	Southern Line	Lakeside towards Simon's Town
Location
- Location within Cape Town Location within South Africa

Steenberg railway station is a Metrorail station on the Southern Line in Steenberg, a suburb of Cape Town. It is located on Henley Road, which is just off Military Road. The station is located on the edge of Steenberg, towards Kirstenhof and is alongside the Keyser River, which flows into Zandvlei.

Steenberg has a small taxi rank which only serves Grassy Park and Steenberg. Buses to Cape Town are only available at early times of the morning.

The station has an island platform, connected by a pedestrian bridge over the tracks. In normal operation, Platform 1 (the western platform) is used for trains travelling towards Cape Town, while Platform 2 (the eastern platform) is used for trains travelling towards Simon's Town.

== History ==
In 2023, a motorcyclist was hit at the crossing by a train next to the railway station.

== Notable places nearby ==
- Zandvlei Estuary Nature Reserve
- Tokai
- Pollsmoor Prison
