= Paul Bell (baseball) =

South African baseball player (born 1980)

- Third baseman / Shortstop/ Second baseman
- Born: 24 June 1980 (age 45); Kenwyn, Western Cape, South Africa
- Bats: Right Throws: Right
- Stats at Baseball Reference

Paul Bell (born June 24, 1980 in Kenwyn, Western Cape) is a South African baseball infielder. Bell signed with the Milwaukee Brewers of Major League Baseball in 2000. He also played for the South Africa national baseball team at the 2000 Summer Olympics and the 2006 World Baseball Classic.

== Professional career ==
Bell played three seasons of professional baseball in the Brewers system. He appeared in 90 total games, got 72 hits for a .238 career batting average. He never played above the A level and left the team after 19 games with the Beloit Brewers.
