= Wynberg railway station =

Metrorail station on the Southern Line, Cape Town

Wynberg
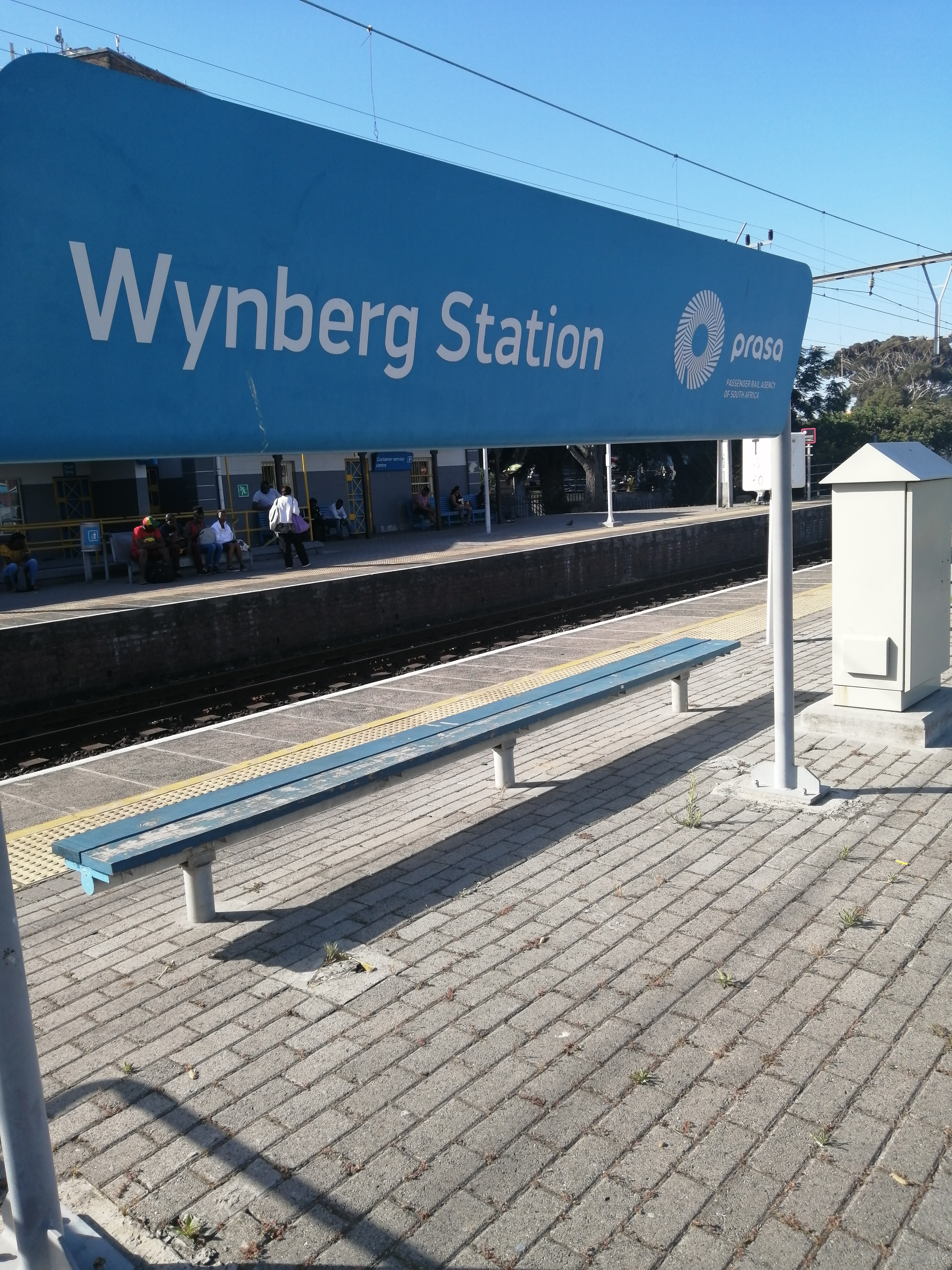
- The station sign

General information
- Location: Station Rd, Wynberg, Cape Town, 7800; South Africa
- Coordinates: 34°0′18″S 18°28′17″E
- System: Metrorail station
- Owner: PRASA
- Line: Southern Line
- Platforms: 2 side platforms
- Tracks: 2 in use

Construction
- Structure type: At-grade

History
- Opened: 19 December 1864
- Electrified: 1928

Services
Preceding station	Metrorail Western Cape	Following station
Kenilworth towards Cape Town	Southern Line	Wittebome towards Simon's Town
Location
- Location within Cape Town Location within South Africa

The Wynberg railway station is a Metrorail station serving the suburb of Wynberg in Cape Town. It is served by trains on the Metrorail Southern Line route.

== History ==
In 1861, the Wynberg Railway Company was established to build a railway line from Salt River to Wynberg. The principal shareholder in the company was James Mortimer Maynard, a wealthy local businessman and politician who funded the construction of the railway line as well as donated the land for the station and the line to be built on. The station and line opened to the public on 19 December 1864. The buildings at the station had been built with cement and brick, in contrast to the main Cape Town Station building, which was constructed out of wood and iron at the time.

The Cape Government Railways took over the Salt River–Wynberg line in 1873 via a lease before fully acquiring it in 1876. The line was extended to Simon's Town in subsequent years. In 1928, the line was electrified with an overhead catenary.

On 2 October 1981, the station was declared a National Monument under the National Monuments Council legislation. At present, the station is owned and operated by Metrorail Western Cape, a division of the Passenger Rail Agency of South Africa.

== Notable places nearby ==
- Wynberg business district, including:
  - Maynard Mall
- Wynberg Magistrates' Court
- Wynberg Park
- Maynardville Open-Air Theatre
