= Lansdowne, Cape Town =

Suburb of Cape Town, in Western Cape, South Africa

Lansdowne
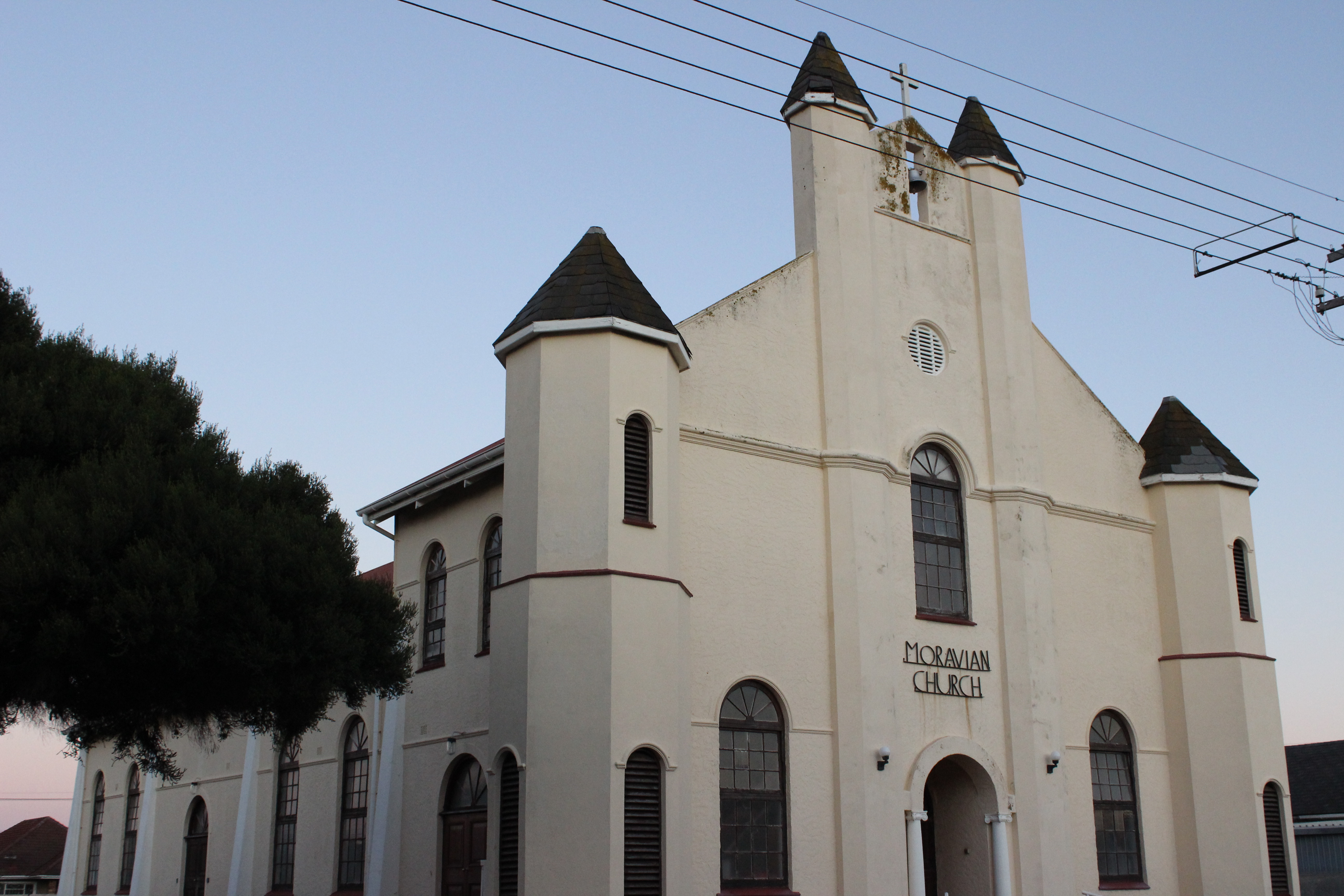
- The Moravian Church in Lansdowne
- Interactive map of Lansdowne
- Coordinates: 33°59′09″S 18°30′01″E
- Country: South Africa
- Province: Western Cape
- Municipality: City of Cape Town
- Main Place: Cape Town

Area
  - Total: 1.40 km^{2} (0.54 sq mi)

Population (2011)
  - Total: 5,853
  - Density: 4,180/km^{2} (10,800/sq mi)

Racial makeup (2011)
  - Black African: 11.9%
  - Coloured: 57.2%
  - Indian/Asian: 13.4%
  - White: 9.2%
  - Other: 8.4%

First languages (2011)
  - English: 84.3%
  - Afrikaans: 7.8%
  - Xhosa: 2.2%
  - Other: 5.6%
- Time zone: UTC+2 (SAST)
- Postal code (street): 7779
- PO box: 7780

Lansdowne is a suburb in Cape Town, South Africa. situated 10 kilometres southeast of Cape Town City Centre, surrounded by the suburbs of Rondebosch East, Crawford, Wetton, Claremont, Kenwyn and Athlone. Lansdowne is served by a railway station of the same name, on the Cape Flats Line.

== Information ==
The suburb of Lansdowne is east of the M5, adjacent to Rondebosch East and Crawford, bordered to the south by Racecourse Road. It is linked to Claremont and more westerly suburbs.

The following high schools are found in Lansdowne- Windsor High School, Groenvlei High school and Oaklands High School. The following primary schools are found in Lansdowne are York Road Primary School Primary School, Portia Primary School and Windsor Primary School. A segment of Lansdowne Road has been renamed to Imam Haron Road.

Lansdowne is the birthplace of acclaimed South African poet and social philosopher Athol Williams. Professional soccer club Engen Santos is based in Lansdowne. The following Mosques are situated in Lansdowne -York Road Mosque and Islamia Mosque, also known as Masjid Al-Furqaan. There is a New Apostolic church, Catholic church, a Methodist church and a Salvation Army church situated in Lansdowne.

Medical facilities:

Lansdowne Clinic

Vitacare Pharmacy

Public amenities:

Lansdowne Post Office

Lansdowne Police Station

Lansdowne Library- https://www.westerncape.gov.za/facility/lansdowne-public-library

Lansdowne Civic Centre

Sports:

Turfhall Stadium

== Government and politics ==
Lansdowne is in the City of Cape Town municipality, it falls within Sub-council 17. It is part of three wards that stretches from Athlone, through Crawford, Penlyn Estate and Hanover Park through Manenberg. The major roads that run through Sub-council 17 include Klipfontein Road, Kromboom Road, Racecourse Road, Jakes Gerwel Drive and Govan Mbeki Drive. Lansdowne is in ward 60 and the acting ward councillor is Mark Kleinschmidt, who is a member of the Democratic Alliance Party(DA).
