= Rondebosch East =

Residential suburb of Cape Town, in Western Cape, South Africa

Rondebosch East Rondebosch-Oos
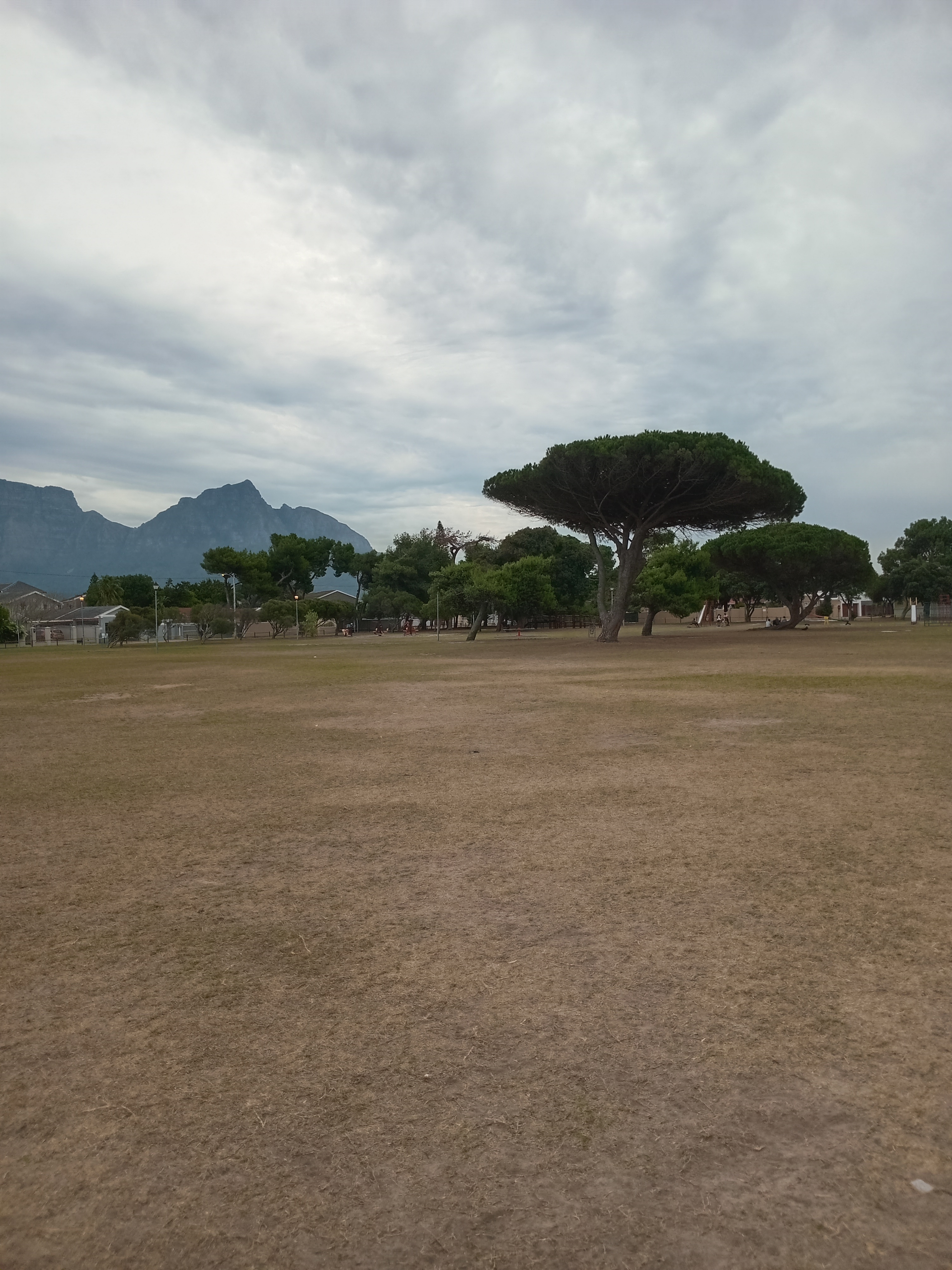
- Smuts Road Park looking towards Table Mountain and Devil's Peak in April 2026.
- Interactive map of Rondebosch East
- Coordinates: 33°58′45″S 18°29′54″E
- Country: South Africa
- Province: Western Cape
- Municipality: City of Cape Town
- Main Place: Cape Town

Government
  - Councillor: Mark Kleinschmidt (Ward 60) (DA)

Area
  - Total: 1.05 km^{2} (0.41 sq mi)

Population (2011)
  - Total: 4,633
  - Density: 4,410/km^{2} (11,400/sq mi)

Racial makeup (2011)
  - Black African: 12.3%
  - Coloured: 51.0%
  - Indian/Asian: 18.5%
  - White: 9.4%
  - Other: 8.9%

First languages (2011)
  - English: 84.4%
  - Afrikaans: 8.1%
  - Xhosa: 2.6%
  - Other: 4.9%
- Time zone: UTC+2 (SAST)
- Postal code (street): 7780
- Area code: 021

Rondebosch East is a residential suburb in Cape Town, South Africa, about 7 kilometres (4.3 mi) south-east of the city centre. As the name suggests, it is located to the east of the neighboring suburb of Rondebosch (separated by the M5 freeway). As of 2001 it had a population of approximately 4,600 people in an area of just over 1 square kilometre (0.4 sq mi). A large common, similar to but smaller than Rondebosch Common, is located in the center of the suburb.

== Governance ==
Rondebosch East lies within ward 60 of the City of Cape Town metropolitan municipality; the current ward councillor is Mark Kleinschmidt of the Democratic Alliance. The ward in turn forms part of the Athlone & District Subcouncil.

== Geography ==
Rondebosch East borders on Athlone to the north and east, Crawford to the east, Lansdowne to the south, and Rondebosch to the west. The boundaries of the area recognised as Rondebosch East in the 2001 Census lie along the M5 freeway (Kromboom Parkway), Mosman Road, the Cape Flats Railway Line, and Lawson Road. It is largely flat, located as it is on the sandy Cape Flats, and is elevated less than 20 metres (66 ft) above sea level.

== Demography ==
The 2011 census recorded the population of Rondebosch East as consisting of 4,633 people. Of these, 52.7% were female and 47.3% male. 51.0% described themselves as "Coloured", 18.5% as "Indian or Asian", 12.3% as "Black African" and 9.4% as "White". 84.4% spoke English as their first language, 8.1% spoke Afrikaans and 2.6% spoke Xhosa.

== Transport ==
Kromboom Road is the main road through Rondebosch East, connecting it to Rondebosch and Crawford, and to the M5 freeway at exit 13. Crawford railway station on the Cape Flats Line is located on the eastern edge of the suburb.

== Education ==
Rondebosch East Primary School previously Alpha Primary is located centrally in Rondebosch East; Windsor High School is located just outside the suburb in Lansdowne.

== Prominent Residents ==
- Nizaam Carr - South African rugby union footballer.
