= Rondebosch railway station =

Metrorail station on the Southern Line

Rondebosch

General information
- Location: Station Road, Rondebosch 7700, Cape Town; South Africa
- Coordinates: 33°57′44″S 18°28′21″E
- System: Metrorail station
- Owner: PRASA
- Line: Southern Line
- Platforms: 2 side platforms
- Tracks: 2
- Connections: Golden Arrow Bus Services; Minibus taxis

Construction
- Structure type: At-grade

Services
Preceding station	Metrorail Western Cape	Following station
Rosebank towards Cape Town	Southern Line	Newlands towards Simon's Town
Location
- Location within Cape Town Location within South Africa

Rondebosch railway station is a Metrorail station on the Southern Line, serving the suburb of Rondebosch in Cape Town.

The station has two side platforms and two tracks; the station building is at ground level on the eastern side of the tracks. The station is also served by Golden Arrow Bus Services.

== Notable places nearby ==
- University of Cape Town
- Rondebosch Common
- Diocesan College
- Groote Schuur Estate
