= Crawford, Cape Town =

Suburb of Cape Town, in Western Cape, South Africa

Crawford
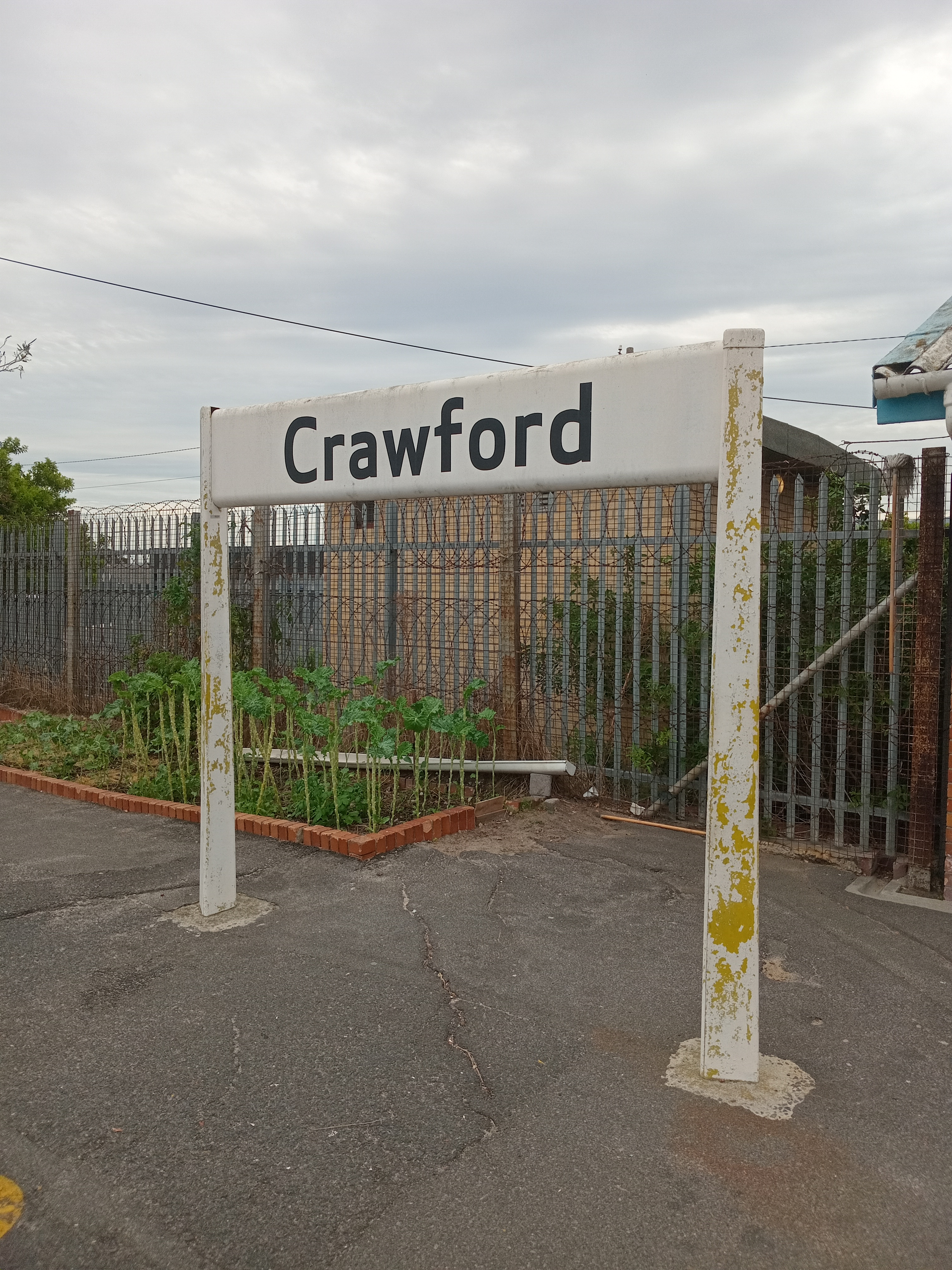
- The station sign at the Crawford railway station in April 2026

- Location within Western Cape Location within South Africa Location within Africa
- Coordinates: 33.9795°S 18.5068°E
- Country: South Africa
- Province: Western Cape
- Municipality: City of Cape Town

Government
  - Councillor: Magedien Davids (Ward 48) (DA)

Area
  - Total: 0.73 km^{2} (0.28 sq mi)

Population (2011)
  - Total: 3,979
  - Density: 5,500/km^{2} (14,000/sq mi)

Racial makeup (2011)
  - Black African: 3.5%
  - Coloured: 58.9%
  - Indian/Asian: 24.4%
  - White: 6.1%
  - Other: 7.1%

First languages (2011)
  - English: 91.6%
  - Afrikaans: 6.1%
  - Other: 2.2%
- Time zone: UTC+2 (SAST)
- Postal code (street): 7770
- PO box: 7780
- Area code: 021

Crawford is a suburb of Cape Town, South Africa, located to the east of the City Centre (CBD) on the Cape Flats to the south of the N2 highway. The suburb is surrounded by the suburbs of Lansdowne, Rondebosch East, Athlone, Belthorn Estate, Rylands, and Belgravia. The main roads through the area are (north to south) Jan Smuts Drive (M17) and (east to west) Turf Hall Road (M24) linking to the M5. Thornton Road was for many years the main thoroughfare for this suburb and a hotbed for anti-apartheid activity in 1976 and 1985. Thornton Road is the location of the Trojan Horse Memorial in honour of those killed in 1985. Crawford is served by a railway station of the same name on the Cape Flats Line.

Crawford is the home of City Park Stadium, home of the historic City and Suburban Rugby Football Union where a number of well-known Cape Flats rugby union teams played, including Universal Rugby Football Club, Progress, Perseverance and others. City Park also hosted the annual City Fair and for some time was the location for the annual Christmas Band competition. Baseball and softball were also played there during the summer months.

More than thirty thousand people attended the funeral of Imam Abdullah Haron in Crawford. He had been arrested by the apartheid security police just after he had led the al-Jaami'a Masjid Milad al-Nabi celebrations on 12 Rabi al-Auwal 1389AH (28 May 1969); and was held under Section 6(1) of the Terrorism Act of 1967 until his death on Saturday, 27 September 1969.

In November 1998 Nelson Mandela was a guest speaker at Crawford's College of Cape Town, formerly Hewat Teachers' Training College, a landmark on the apartheid struggle map. He spoke to the residents of Athlone, custodians of the famous Klipfontein Road, that had survived many of the suburb's apartheid altercations.
