= Kenilworth railway station (Cape Town) =

Metrorail station on the Southern Line, Cape Town

Kenilworth
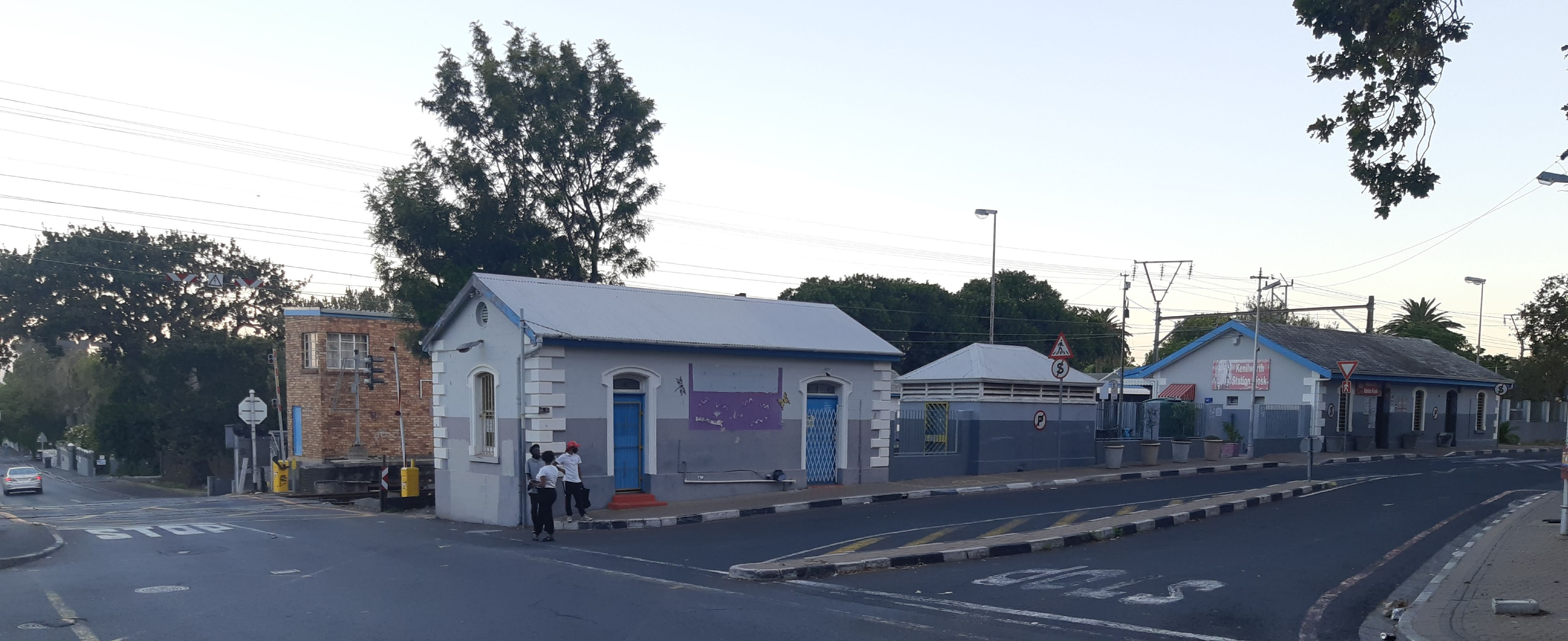
- The station in 2021

General information
- Location: Blackheath Rd, Kenilworth, Cape Town, 7708; South Africa
- Coordinates: 33°59′43″S 18°28′21″E
- System: Metrorail station
- Owner: PRASA
- Line: Southern Line
- Platforms: 2 side platforms
- Tracks: 2

Construction
- Structure type: At-grade
- Architectural style: Cape Regency

History
- Opened: c. February 1965

Services
| Preceding station | Metrorail Western Cape | Following station |
|---|---|---|
| Harfield Road towards Cape Town | Southern Line | Wynberg towards Simon's Town |
Location

The Kenilworth railway station is a Metrorail train station serving the suburb of Kenilworth in Cape Town, South Africa. It is served by trains running on the Southern Line.

== History ==
In 1861, the Wynberg Railway Company was established via an act of parliament to build a railway line from Salt River to Wynberg. The line officially opened to the public on 18 December 1864.

The station, initially called Mortimerville, began as a "stopping place" along the line, consisting of a wooden shed. Shortly after the line's opening, the Cape Town Railway and Dock Company decided that all such "stopping places" along the line be upgraded to proper station buildings and agreed that the Wynberg Railway Company would build these before February 1865. The station was constructed out of bricks and cement and was built in a Cape Regency architectural style.

The station's name was changed to Kenilworth in 1882. In 1928, the line was electrified.

== Notable places nearby ==
- Kenilworth Racecourse
- St. James Church
- Kenilworth Centre
- Pick n Pay head office
