= Crawford railway station (Cape Town) =

Metrorail station on the Cape Flats Line

Crawford
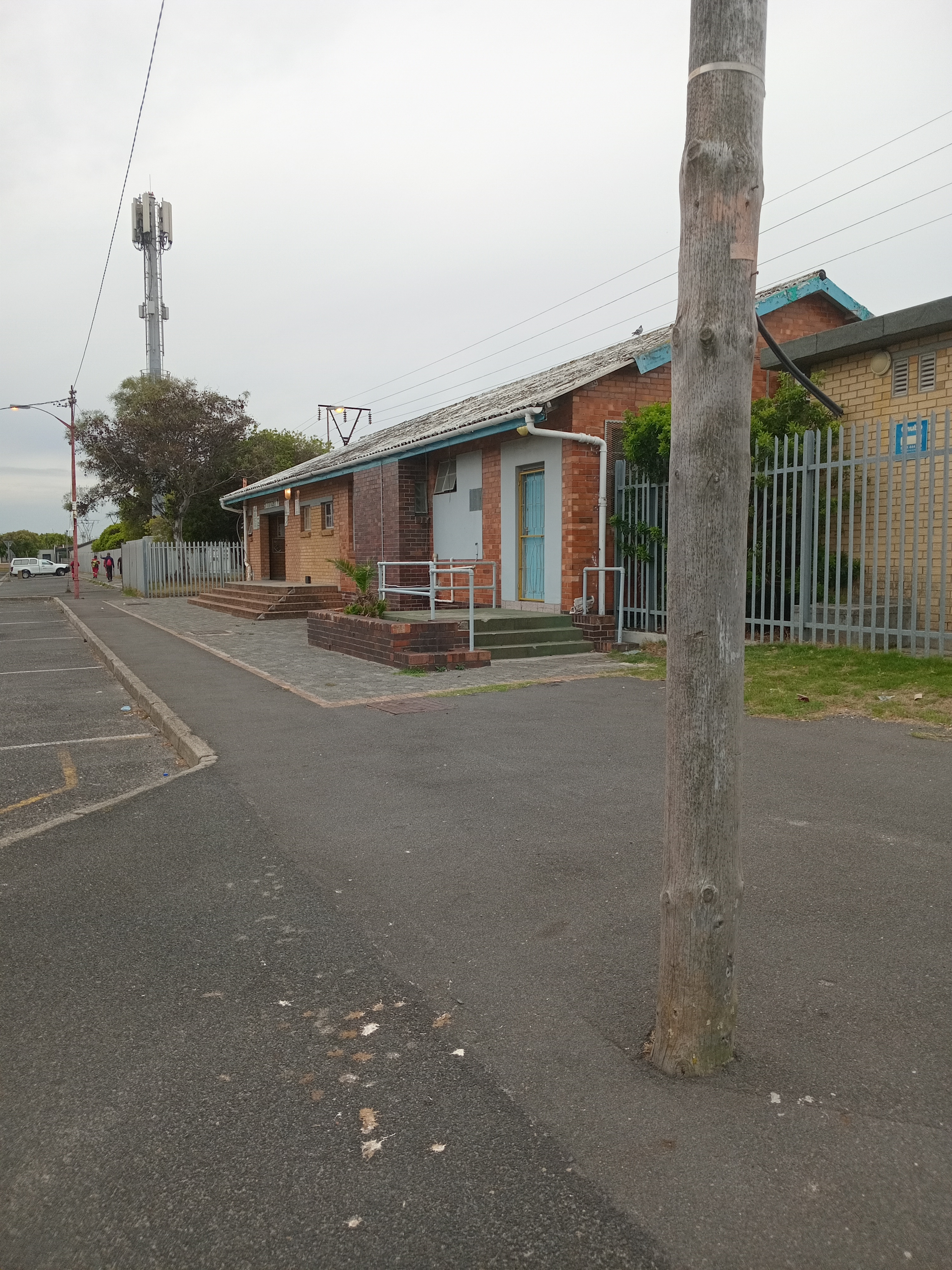
- The station in April 2026

General information
- Location: First Avenue, Rondebosch East 7780, Cape Town; South Africa
- Coordinates: 33°58′35″S 18°30′4″E
- System: Metrorail station
- Owner: PRASA
- Line: Cape Flats Line
- Platforms: 2 side platforms
- Tracks: 2

Construction
- Structure type: At-grade

Services
Preceding station	Metrorail Western Cape	Following station
Athlone towards Cape Town	Cape Flats Line	Lansdowne towards Retreat
Location
- Location within Cape Town Location within South Africa

Crawford railway station is a Metrorail station that serves the suburbs of Rondebosch East and Crawford in Cape Town, South Africa. It is served by trains on the Cape Flats Line.

The station, which is located between First Avenue in Rondebosch East and Allister Road in Crawford, has two side platforms and a station building at ground level on the west side of the tracks. The platforms are connected by two pedestrian subways.

== Notable places nearby ==
- College of Cape Town Crawford campus
