= College of Cape Town =

Public college in Cape Town, South Africa

College Of Cape Town
- Motto: Inspiring minds
- Type: Public
- Established: 1900; 126 years ago
- Principal: Robert Nkuna
- Students: ~14,000 (2026)
- Location: Cape Town, Western Cape, South Africa; 33.9732°N 18.5121°E
- Campus: Urban
- Language: English
- Colors: White & red
- Website: cct.edu.za

College of Cape Town (CCT), is a public higher education institution located in Cape Town, South Africa. Founded in 1900, the college is classified as a TVET institution, and is the oldest of its kind in South Africa.

As of 2026, CCT operates a total of eight campuses, and serves approximately 14,000 students. It provides career-oriented vocational and occupational programs in a wide range of fields.

== History ==
The institution was founded in 1900 as a high school, and took its present name in 2002.

After transitioning to a higher education institution, the College of Cape Town's initial mission was to provide education for Coloureds and black South Africans seeking tertiary education.

On February 1, 2002, four former technical colleges; Athlone College, Cape College, Sivuyile College, and Maitland Technical College/Western Province Technical College were officially merged to become the College of Cape Town, this came after the South African government decided to rationalize TVET Colleges, which resulted in 150 colleges in South Africa being reduced to about 50.

In 2026, South Africa's Sector Education and Training Authorities (SETAs) were put under review and overhauled by Minister of Higher Education and Training Buti Manamela. As part of this process College of Cape Town's Administrator, M.M. Muswaba, was dismissed following disciplinary action. He was replaced by Robert Nkuna.

== Programs ==
College of Cape Town is organized into 11 academic units:

- Art and design
- Beauty therapy
- Building and civil engineering
- Business student
- Education and training
- Electrical engineering
- Hair care
- Hospitality
- Information and communication technology
- Mechanical engineering
- Travel and tourism

== Campuses ==
As of 2026, College of Cape Town campuses include:

Campus	Location	Former name	Ref.
Athlone Campus	Athlone	Athlone Technical College	
City Campus	Cape Town CBD		
Crawford Campus	Crawford	Hewat Teachers Training College	
Gardens Campus	Gardens		
Gugulethu Campus	Guguletu	Sivuyile Technical College	
Pinelands Campus	Pinelands	Maitland Technical College/ Western Province Technical College	
Thornton Campus	Thornton	Thornton High School (1964- 1991); Western Province College (1992)	
Wynberg Campus	Wynberg		
