= Fish Hoek railway station =

Railway station in Cape Town, South Africa

Fish Hoek
- The station in June 2026

General information
- Location: Main Road, Fish Hoek, 7975, Cape Town; South Africa
- Coordinates: 34.1371°S 18.4324°E
- System: Metrorail station
- Owner: PRASA
- Line: Southern Line
- Platforms: 3 (1 side platform, 1 island)
- Tracks: 3

Construction
- Structure type: At-grade

History
- Opened: 1 December 1890

Services
Preceding station	Metrorail Western Cape	Following station
Kalk Bay towards Cape Town	Southern Line	Sunny Cove towards Simon's Town
Location
- Location within Cape Town

Fish Hoek railway station is a railway station in Fish Hoek, Cape Town, South Africa. The station opened on 1 December 1890 as the first station on the extension from Kalk Bay to Simon's Town, the present-day terminus. It was electrified in 1928. Fish Hoek is served by Southern Line services operated by Metrorail.

The station has park-and-ride facilities located on Beach Road, operated by the City of Cape Town.

== Gallery ==
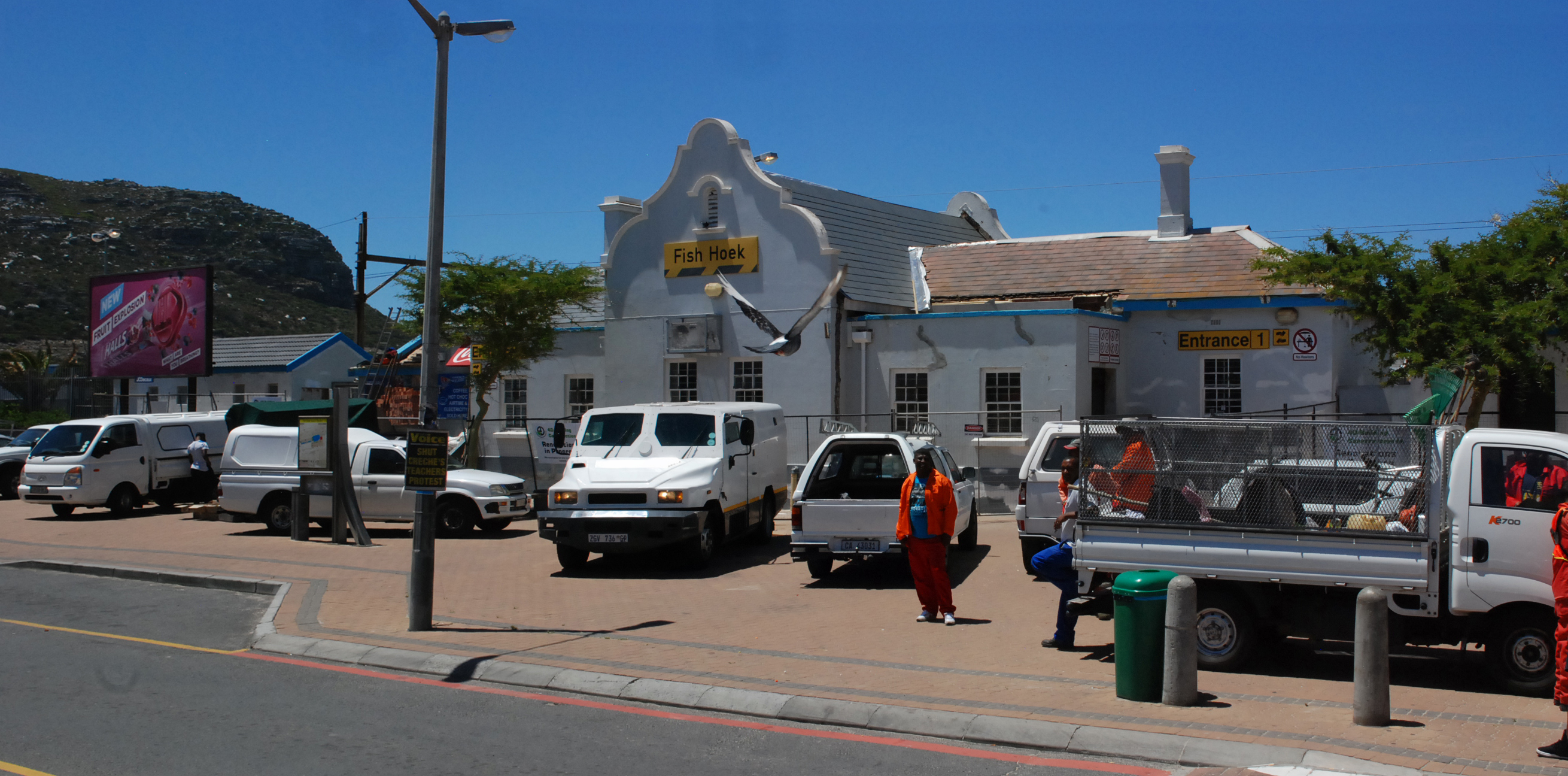

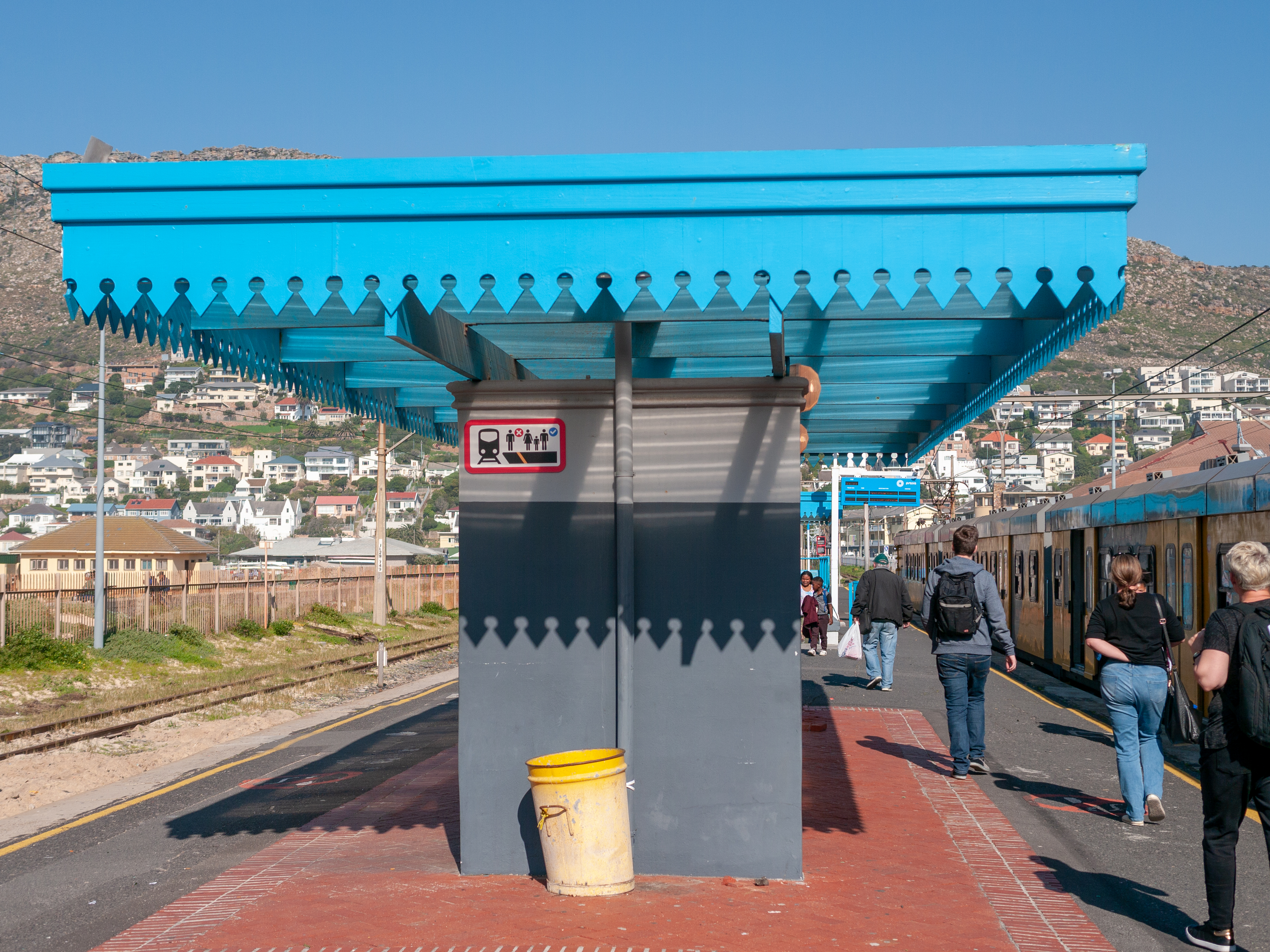

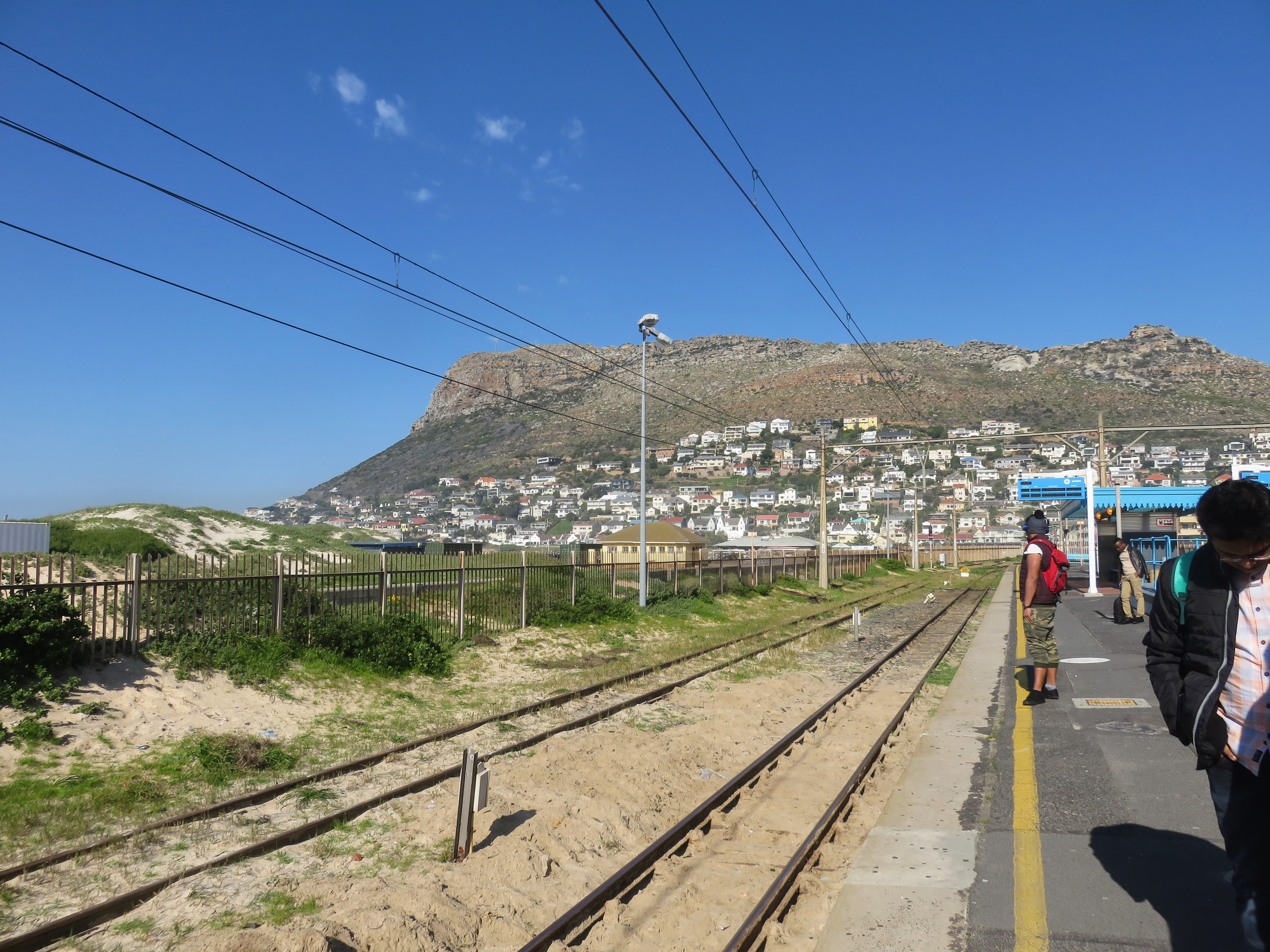

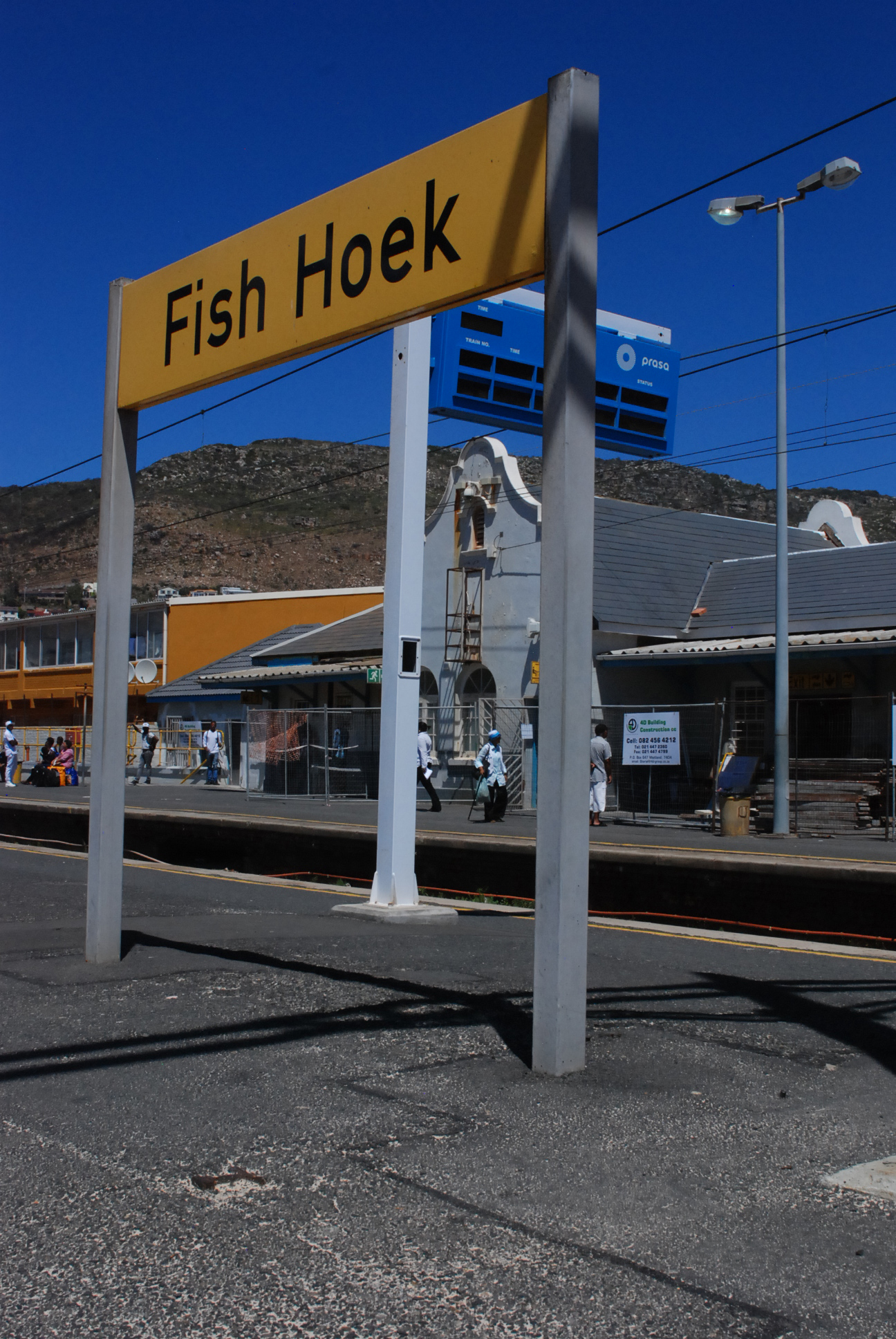

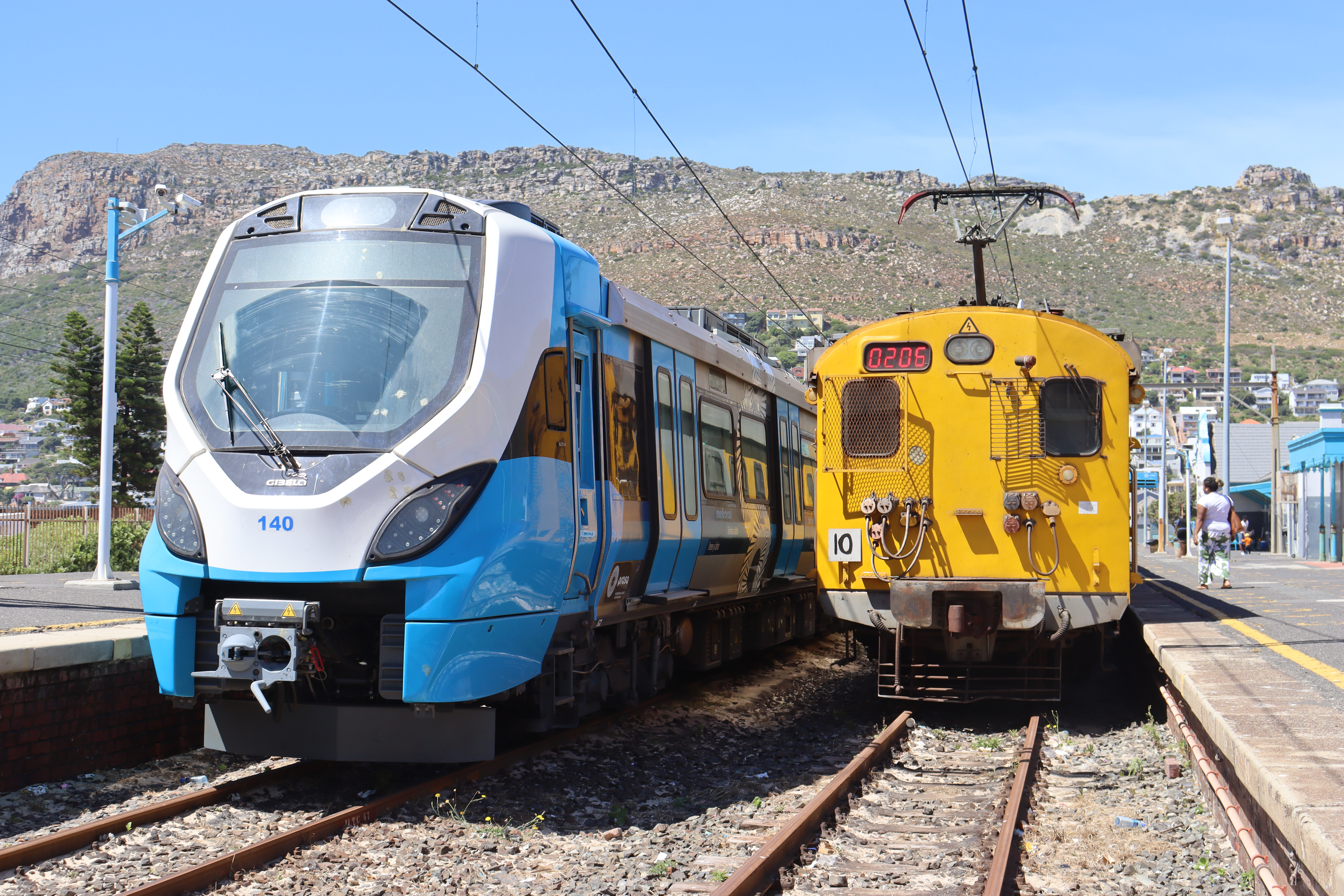
X'Trapolis Mega and Class 5M2 trains at Fish Hoek
