= Steenberg, Cape Town =

Suburb of Cape Town, Western Cape, South Africa

Steenberg
- Interactive map of Steenberg
- Coordinates: 34°4′S 18°28′E
- Country: South Africa
- Province: Western Cape
- Municipality: City of Cape Town
- Main Place: Cape Town

Area
  - Total: 0.90 km^{2} (0.35 sq mi)

Population (2011)
  - Total: 4,168
  - Density: 4,600/km^{2} (12,000/sq mi)

Racial makeup (2011)
  - Black African: 4.1%
  - Coloured: 93.5%
  - Indian/Asian: 0.9%
  - White: 0.7%
  - Other: 0.8%

First languages (2011)
  - English: 54.1%
  - Afrikaans: 43.7%
  - Other: 2.2%
- Time zone: UTC+2 (SAST)
- Postal code (street): 7947
- PO box: 7945
- Area code: 021

Steenberg is a small neighborhood in the Cape Flats region of Cape Town, South Africa. In the 2011 South African Census, the suburb had a population of just over 4,000, many of whom are part of the Cape Coloured community.

The main center of the suburb is Military Road, which runs from west connecting Tokai and Kirstenhof at the M4 Main Road and then east into the M5 which provides access to Muizenberg and various other northern suburbs including Bellville and Century City.

Military Road has many small businesses lining its south side but also one of South Africa's largest retailers, Shoprite, which has a branch located close to the M5.

== Geography ==
Steenberg is located near the False Bay coast. It is bounded to the south by Lakeside and Muizenberg, west by Tokai, east by Lavender Hill and Seawinds (which are extensions of Steenberg), and north by Retreat and Heathfield. The Sand River runs through it which springs in the Zandvlei Estuary Nature Reserve in Muizenberg and is an important conservation area.

Around a third of the suburb is empty land. Steenberg is home to one of the last remaining sites of the Western Leopard Toad.

== Housing ==
The suburb comprises mainly detached and semi-detached homes. In November 2025, the average price of a detached house in Steenberg was R1.47 million.

== Facilities ==
- Steenberg Primary School
- Steenberg High School
- Steenberg Community Center
