= Athlone, Cape Town =

Suburb of Cape Town, South Africa, on the Cape Flats

Athlone
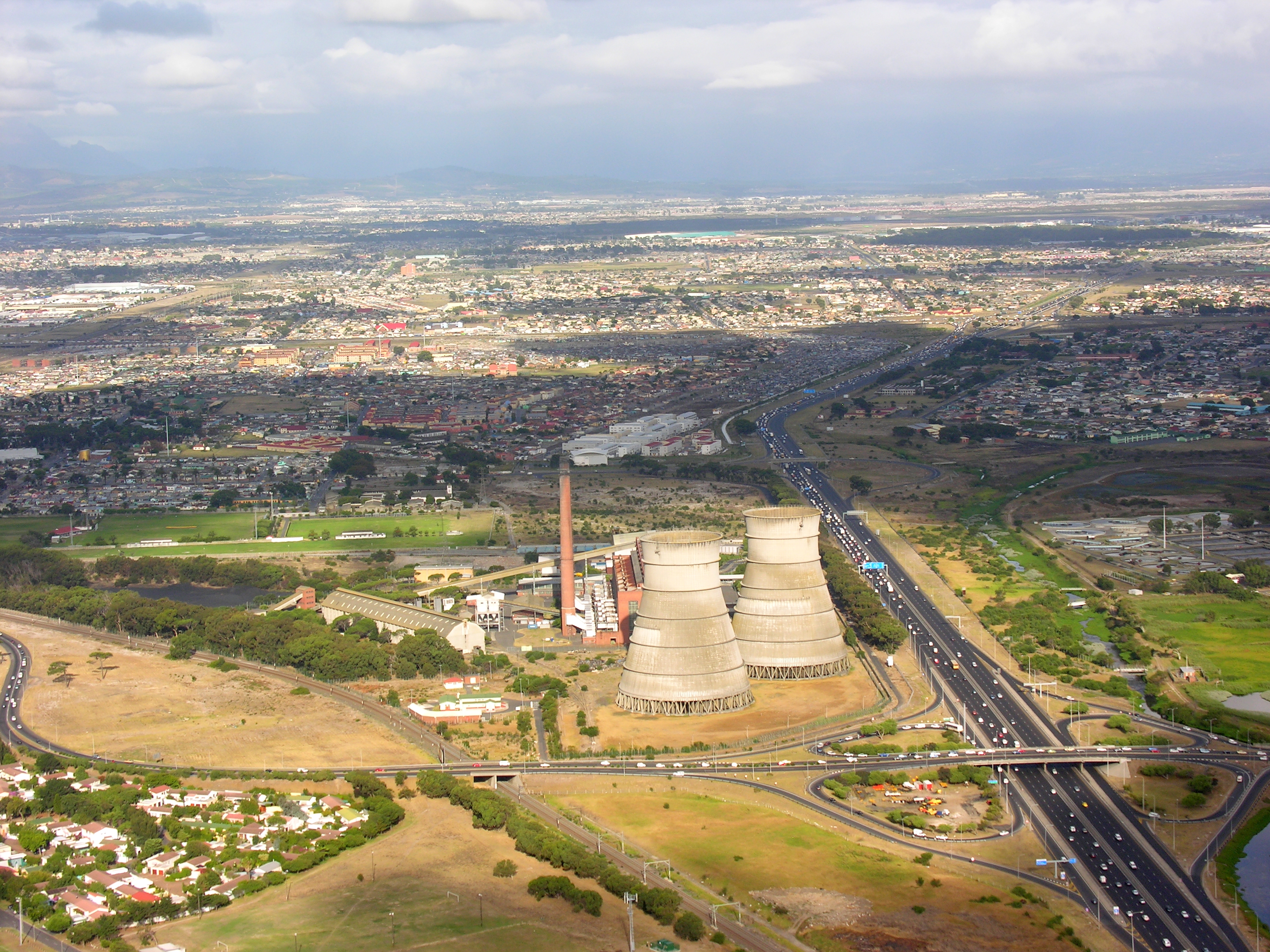
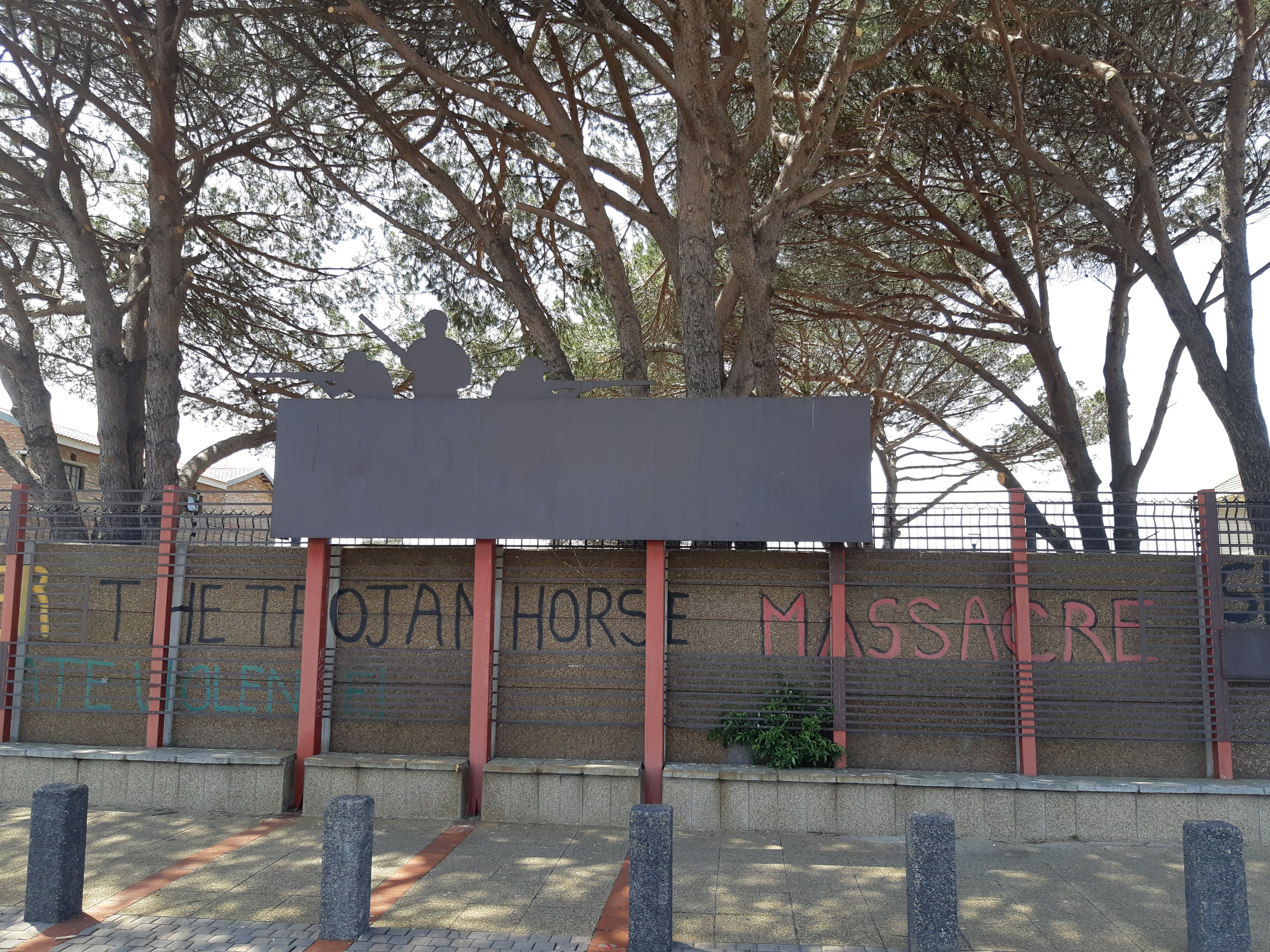
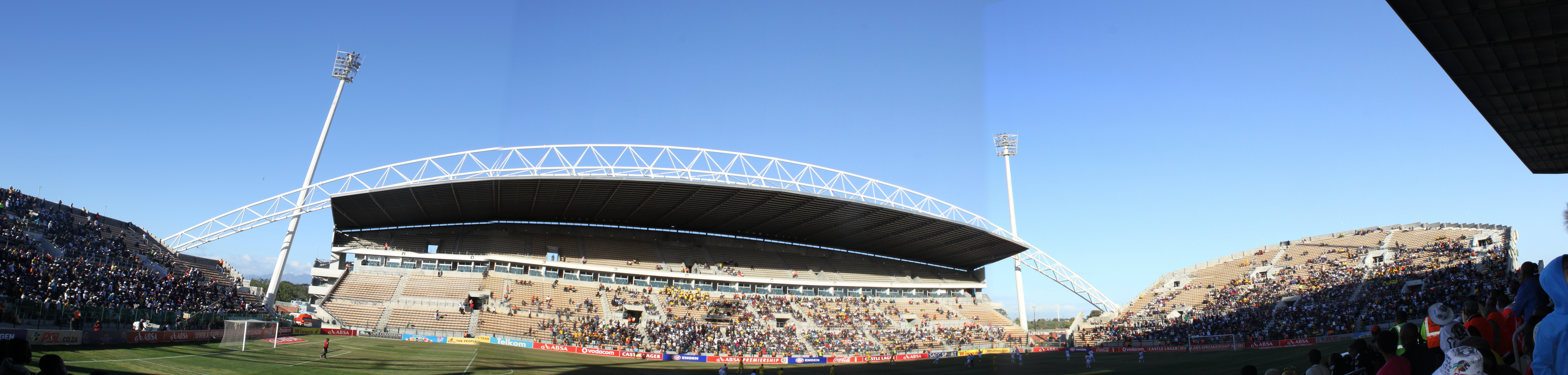
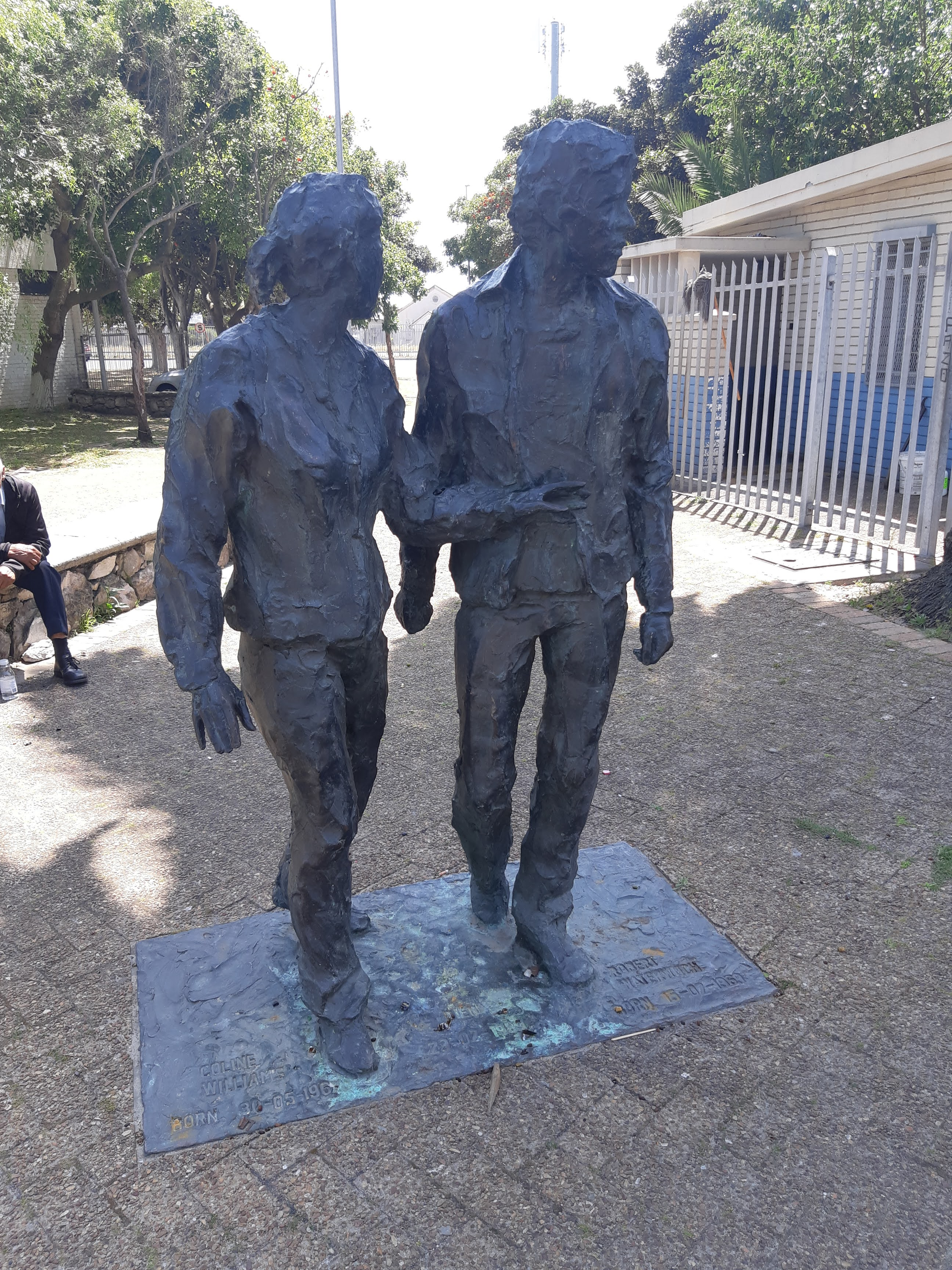
- Clockwise from top left: Athlone power station prior to the demolition of its cooling towers; the Trojan Horse Memorial; the Athlone stadium; the Robert Waterwitch / Coline Williams Memorial statue

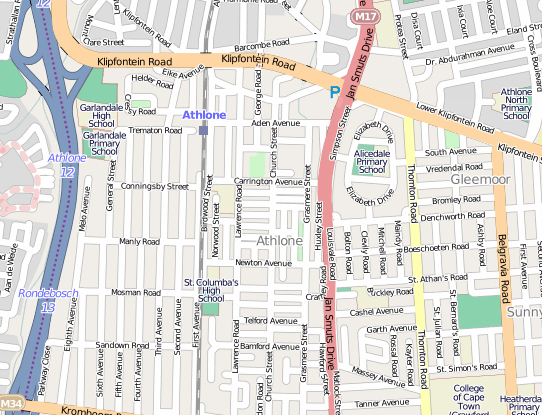
- Street map of Athlone

- Location within Western Cape Location within South Africa Location within Africa
- Coordinates: 33°57′40″S 18°30′11″E
- Country: South Africa
- Province: Western Cape
- Municipality: City of Cape Town

Government
  - Councillor: Mustapha Murudker (Ward 48) ANC; Patrick Hill (Ward 60) (DA)

Area
  - Total: 1.50 km^{2} (0.58 sq mi)

Population (2011)
  - Total: 8,893
  - Density: 5,930/km^{2} (15,400/sq mi)

Racial makeup (2011)
  - Black African: 8.5%
  - Coloured: 82.8%
  - Indian/Asian: 4.1%
  - White: 1.1%
  - Other: 3.5%

First languages (2011)
  - English: 81.6%
  - Afrikaans: 11.7%
  - Other: 6.7%
- Time zone: UTC+2 (SAST)
- Postal code (street): 7764
- PO box: 7760
- Area code: 021

Athlone is a suburb of Cape Town, and part of the city's Cape Flats region. Two of the suburb's main landmarks are Athlone Stadium and the decommissioned, coal-burning Athlone Power Station.

The suburb is mixed-use, with residential, industrial (Athlone Industria 1 & 2), and commercial (Athlone CBD and Gatesville) zones. It is served by a railway station of the same name. There are many sub-areas within Athlone, including Gatesville, Rylands, Belgravia Estate, Bridgetown, and Hazendal.

== Geography ==
Athlone is situated in Cape Town's Cape Flats region. The suburb is located to the east of Cape Town CBD, and south of the N2 highway.

It is bordered by Rondebosch East to the south, Belgravia to the east, Hazendal and Sybrand Park to the north, and Rondebosch to the west. The suburb is almost rectangular in shape, with four major roads surrounding it. Clockwise from north, these are the M18 (Klipfontein Road). the M17 (Jan Smuts Drive), the M43 (Kromboom Road), and the M5 freeway.

Athlone is situated approximately 12km from Cape Town CBD, 10km from Cape Town International Airport, 12km from Century City, and 20km from the coast at Muizenberg.

== History ==
Originally known as West London the area was renamed Athlone after Alexander Cambridge, 1st Earl of Athlone who was Governor-General of the Union of South Africa from 1924 to 1930.

In 1946 the area was designated a coloured residential area. By 1948 more than 6000 black residents had been removed from Athlone and were settled in Nyanga. Many of these residents were Xhosa-speaking dock workers in the city's shores. Years later, black residents in District Six were forcibly removed and were relocated to Gugulethu between 1959 and 1964.

Athlone is the home of the Trojan Horse Memorial, a reminder of the Trojan Horse Incident which took place in 1985, when three anti-apartheid protesters were killed and fifteen others wounded in a police ambush. The incident took place near the Alexander Sinton Secondary School where students had demanded to attend school the month before.

The Athlone Magistrate's court is the home of the Robert Waterwitch / Colleen Williams Memorial established in memory of two ANC activists who died in the struggle against apartheid. Waterwitch and Williams died an explosion outside the court on 23 July 1989.

== Transit ==
The suburb is served by the M5 freeway, one of Cape Town's two major municipal freeways, which forms Athlone's western border. Both Kromboom Road and Klipfontein Road feed traffic into Athlone from the M5.

In the north of the suburb is Athlone Station; part of the Cape Flats Line of the city's Metrorail commuter rail system.

The in-progress MyCiTi bus rapid transit (BRT) network's Phase 2A expansion will result in the nearest BRT station to Athlone being Flamingo Station, situated on Racecourse Road in Lansdowne, around 3km away.

== Housing ==
Athlone has a mix of housing types, including detached homes and apartments. In September 2026, the average price of a 3-bedroom detached house in Athlone was around R1.94 million. That same month, the average price of an apartment in the suburb was approximately R1.3 million.

In terms of rentals, the average price of a 2-bedroom apartment in September 2026 was R11,000 per month.

== Education ==
Educational institutions in Athlone include:

- Primary Schools
  - Athlone North Primary, Regina Cloie Primary, Silverlea Primary, Blossom Primary, Bridgeville Primary, Kewtown Primary, Alicedale Primary, Heatherdale Primary, Turfhall Primary, Cypruss Primary, Garlandale Primary, St Raphaels Primary, Sunnyside Primary, and Rylands Primary
- High Schools
  - Spes Bona High, Ned Doman High, Alexander Sinton High, Athlone High, Peak View High, Bridgetown High, Rylands High, and Belgravia High
- Tertiary Institutions
  - College of Cape Town Athlone Campus, and College of Cape Town Crawford Campus

== Organizations in Athlone ==
The Anti-Eviction Campaign and the Gatesville Hawkers Association have a strong presence with many members in Athlone. There are many neighbourhood watches in the Athlone area, including Rylands Neighbourhood Watch, Surrey Patrol, Greenhaven Crime Watch and Habibia Neighbourhood Watch.

== Demographics ==
As of the census of 2001, there were 11,556 households and 45,056 people residing in the suburb. The racial makeup of the suburb was 3.21% Black African, 69.66% coloured, 23.45% Indian/Asian, 3.68% white and 0% from other races.

The suburb population age varies with 28.38% under the age of 18, 28.37% from 18 to 34, 26.53% from 35 to 54, 8.04% from 55 to 64, and 8.66% who were 65 years of age or older. For every 100 women there were 86.53 males.

82.58% of the population speak English, 15.18% speak Afrikaans, 1.13% speak Xhosa, 0.52% speak another African language and 0.59% some other language as a first language.

== Athlone Power Station ==
The decommissioned Athlone Power Station is situated alongside the N2. The cooling towers, commonly referred to as the "Athlone Towers", were demolished on 22 August 2010.
