= Simon's Town railway station =

Metrorail railway station at the end of the Southern Line

Simon's Town
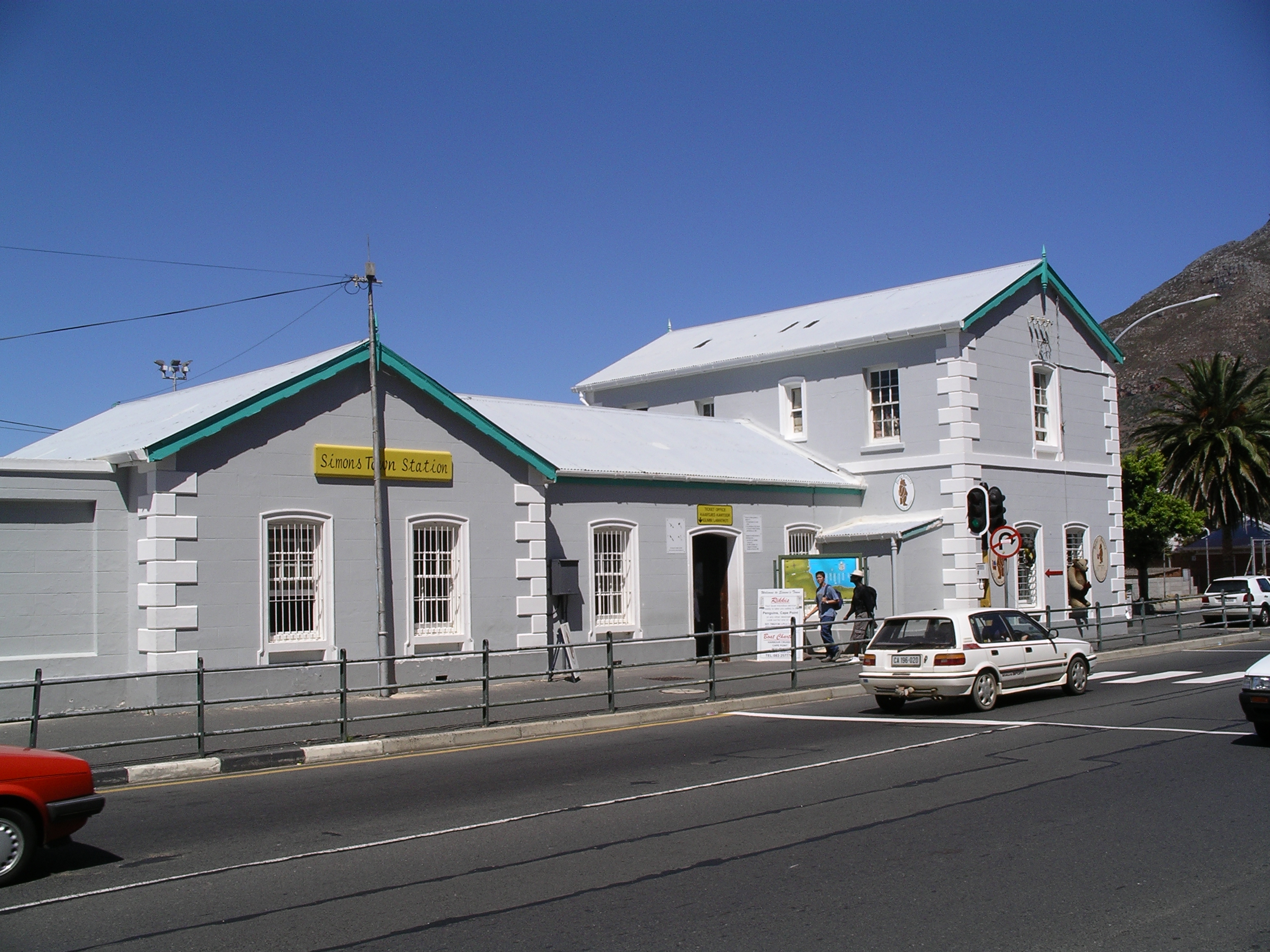

General information
- Location: Station Road, Simon's Town, 7975, Cape Town; South Africa
- Coordinates: 34.1868°S 18.4253°E
- System: Metrorail station
- Owner: PRASA
- Line: Southern Line
- Platforms: 3 (1 side platform, 1 island)
- Tracks: 3
- Connections: Golden Arrow Bus Services

Construction
- Structure type: At-grade

History
- Opened: 1890

Services
Preceding station	Metrorail Western Cape	Following station
Glencairn towards Cape Town	Southern Line	Terminus
Location
- Location within Cape Town Location within South Africa

Simon's Town railway station is a Metrorail railway station in the town of Simon's Town on the Cape Peninsula; it is the southern terminus of the Southern Line. The station is located between Station Road (the M4) and the beach.

The railway line from Fish Hoek into Simon's Town is single-track, but the station itself has three tracks; one track is served by a side platform next to the station building on Station Road, while the other two are served by an island platform connected by a pedestrian subway.

There were no trains running on the 6.3 km final section of the Cape Town suburban line between Fish Hoek and Simon's Town from November 2009 until February 2011, due to unusually high tides that piled heaps of sand on the line and caused serious damage beyond Glencairn, where structure beneath the track was undermined.

== Gallery ==
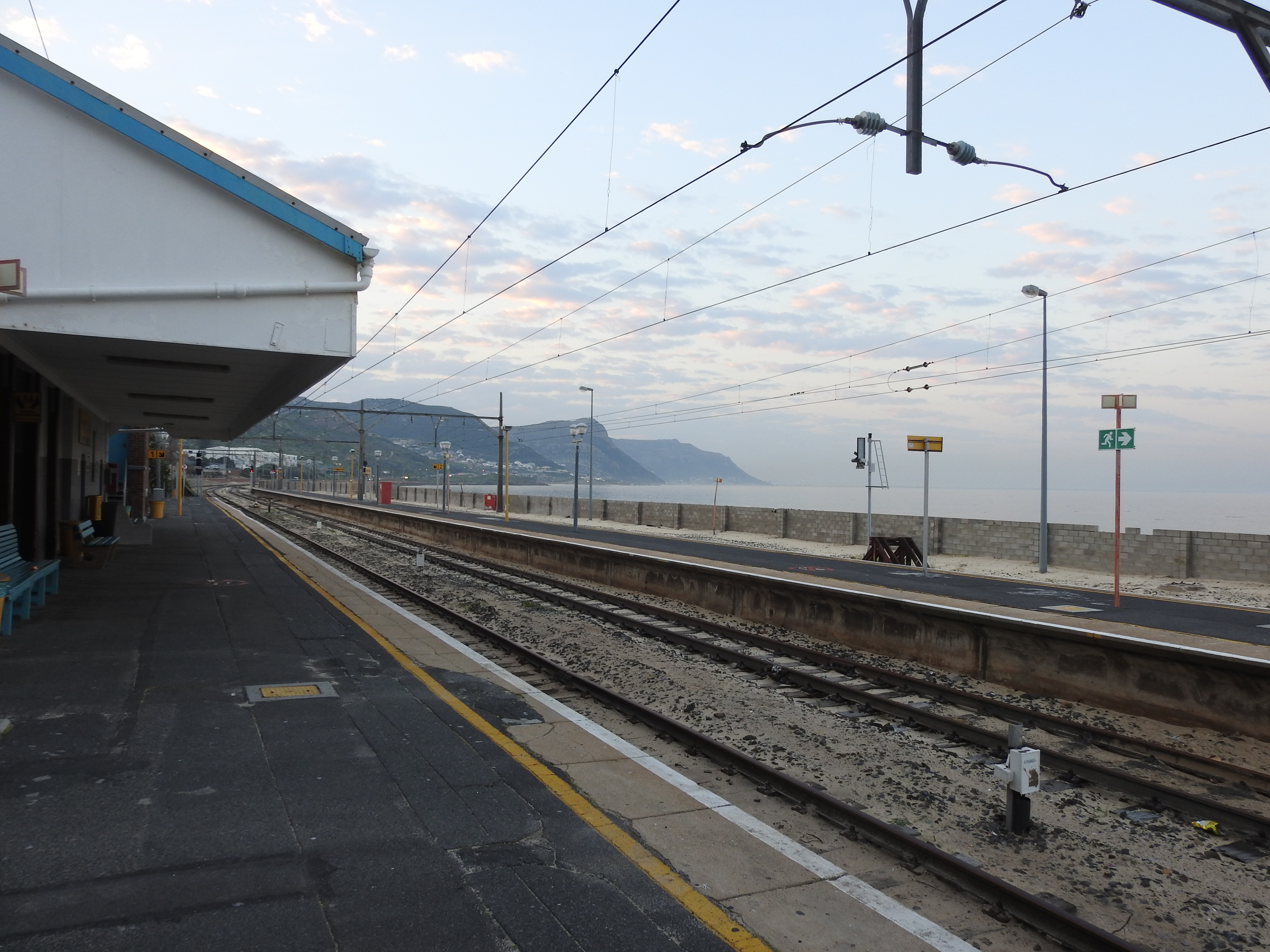

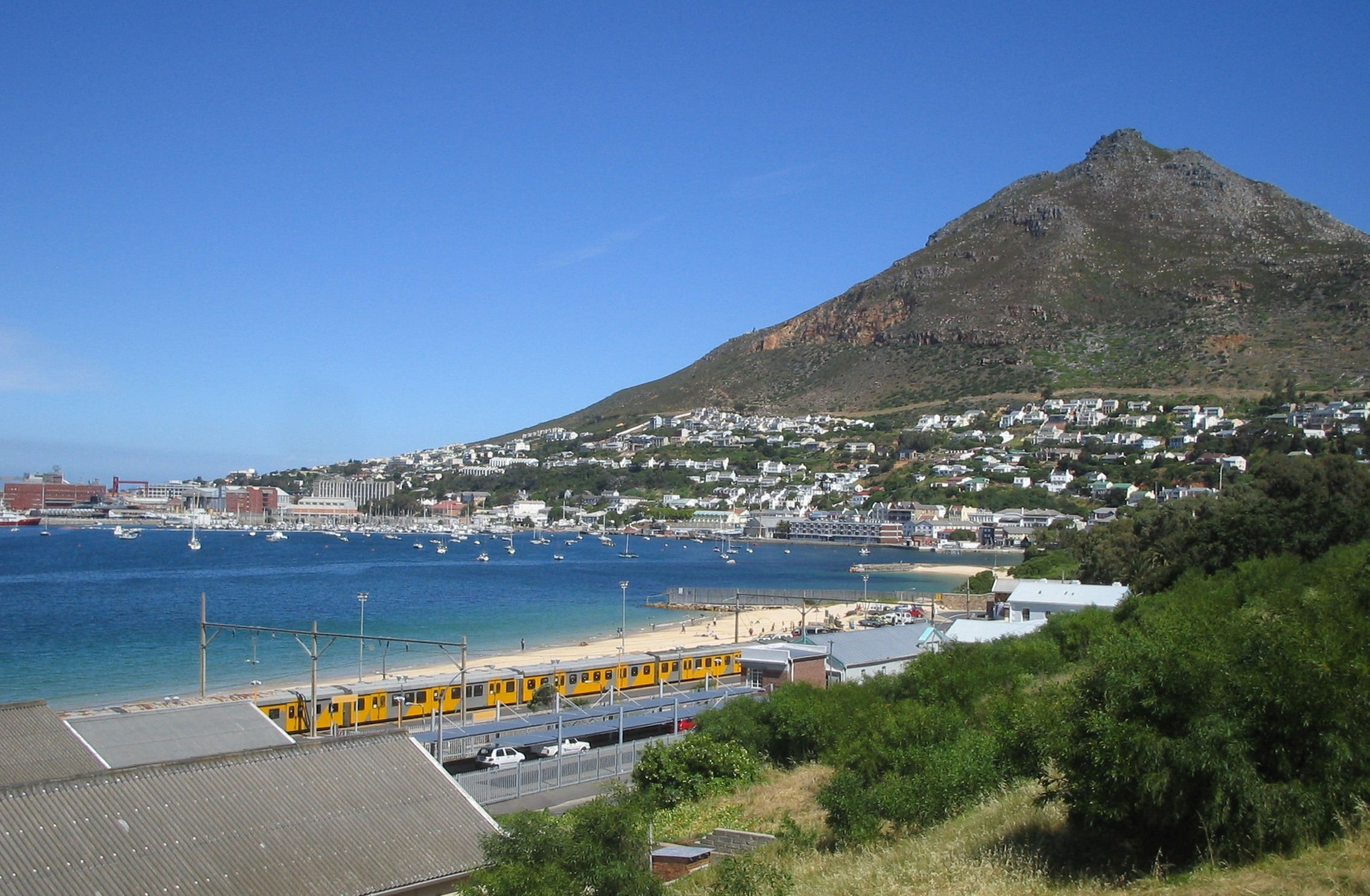

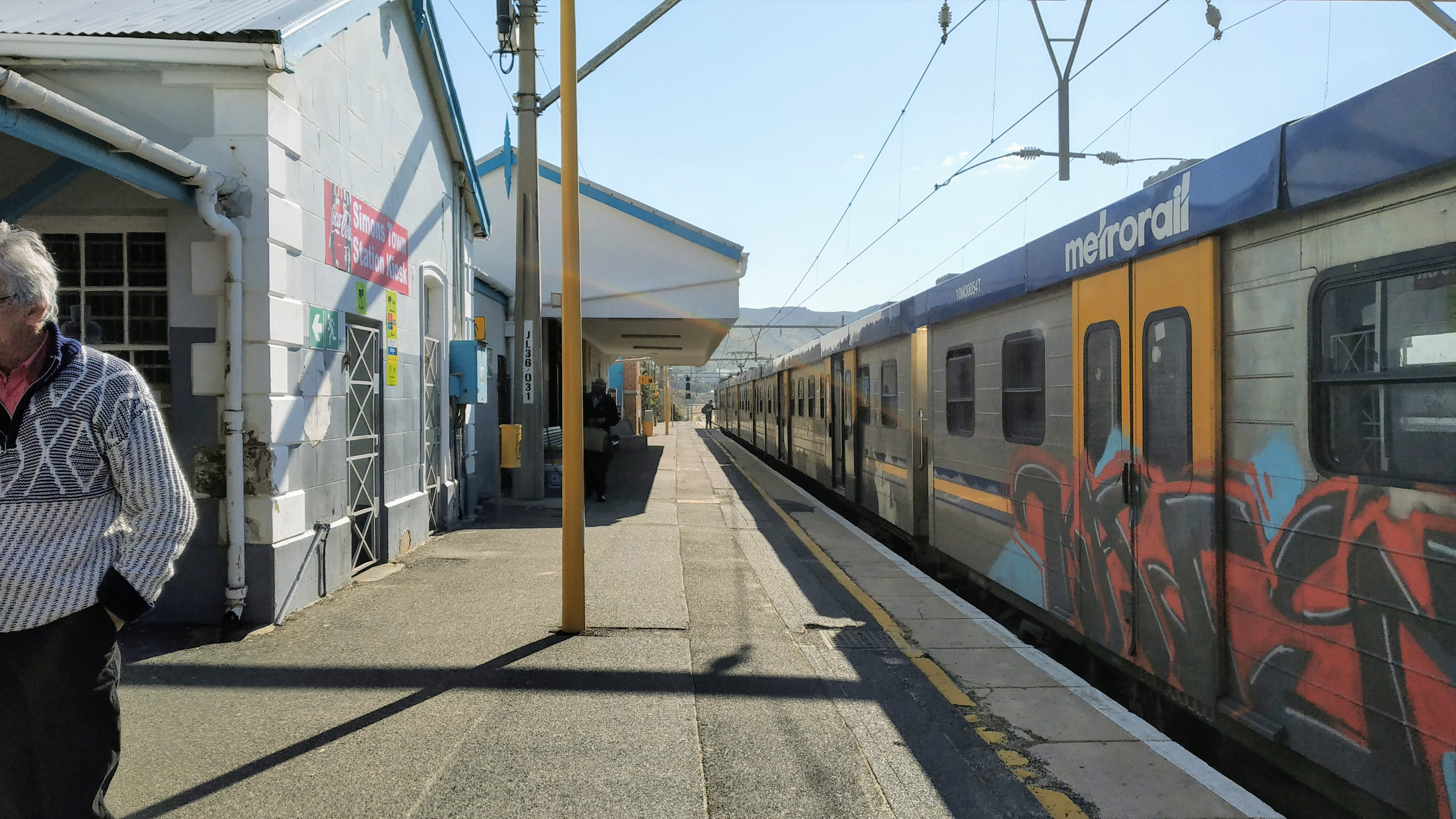

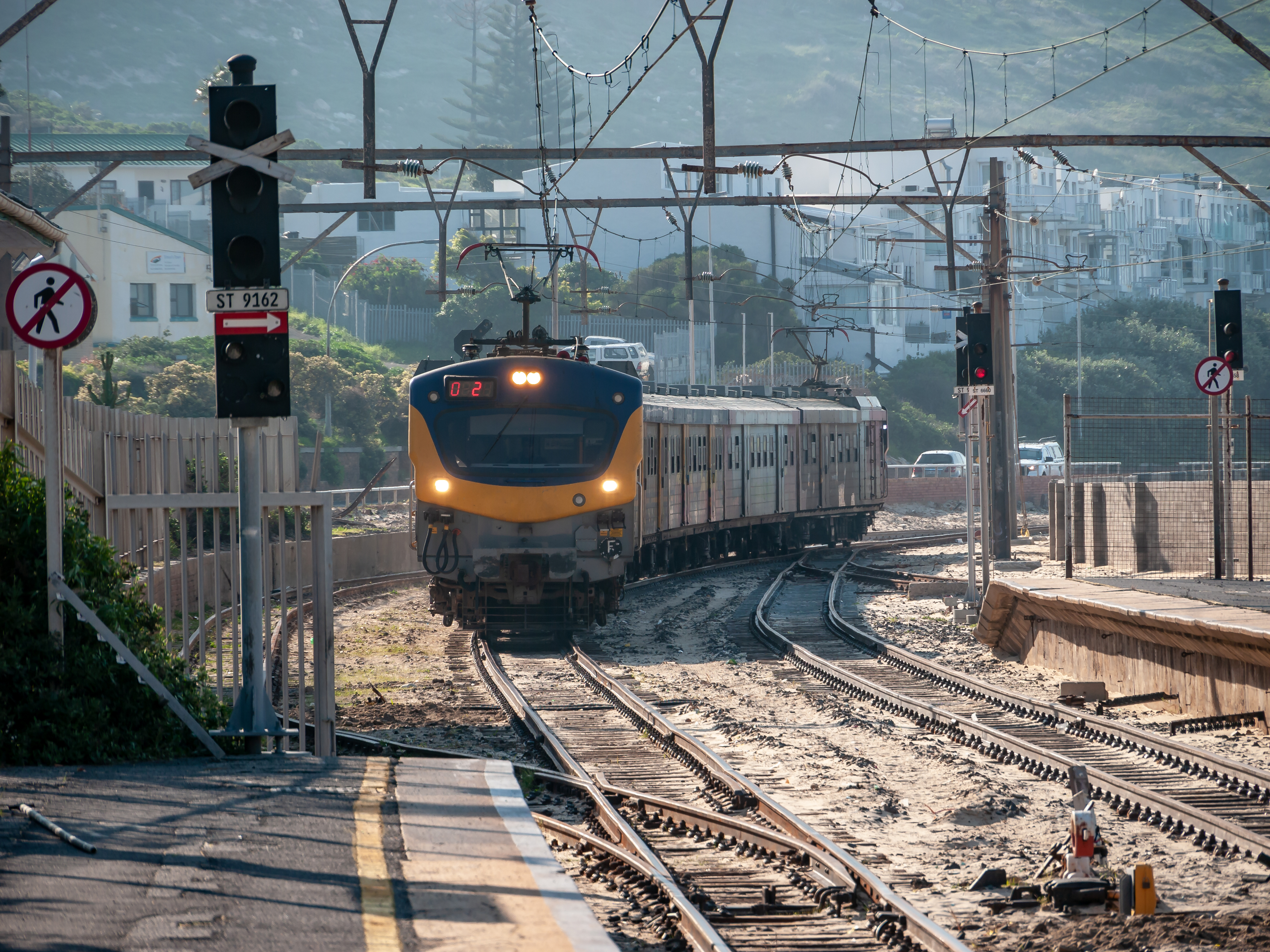
A terminating Class 10M3

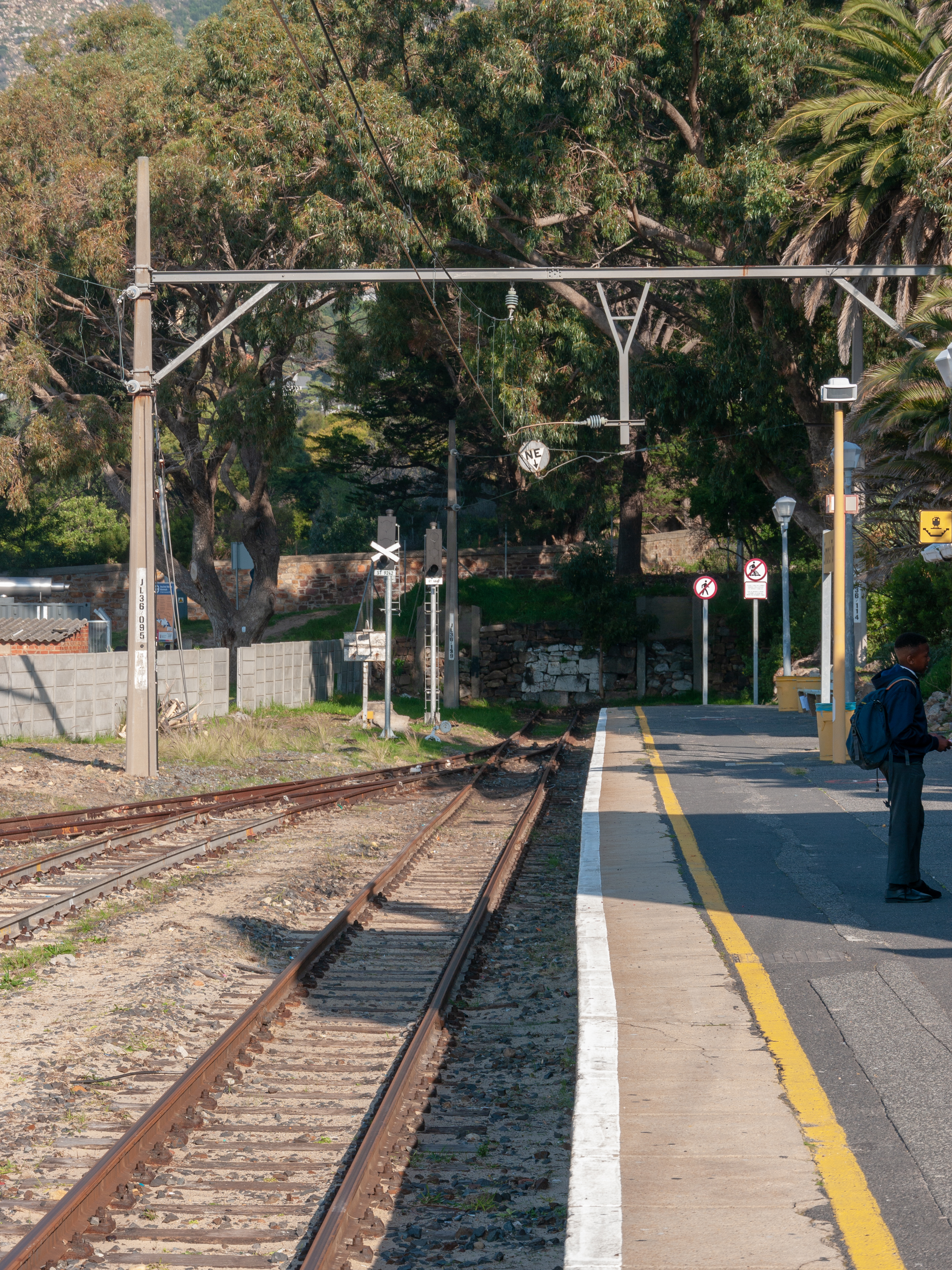

The station viewed from the south

== Vicinity ==
- Naval Base Simon's Town
- Boulders Beach
- False Bay Yacht Club
- Jubilee Square
