= Metrorail KwaZulu-Natal =

Commuter rail system in the Greater Durban region

Metrorail KwaZulu-Natal Region
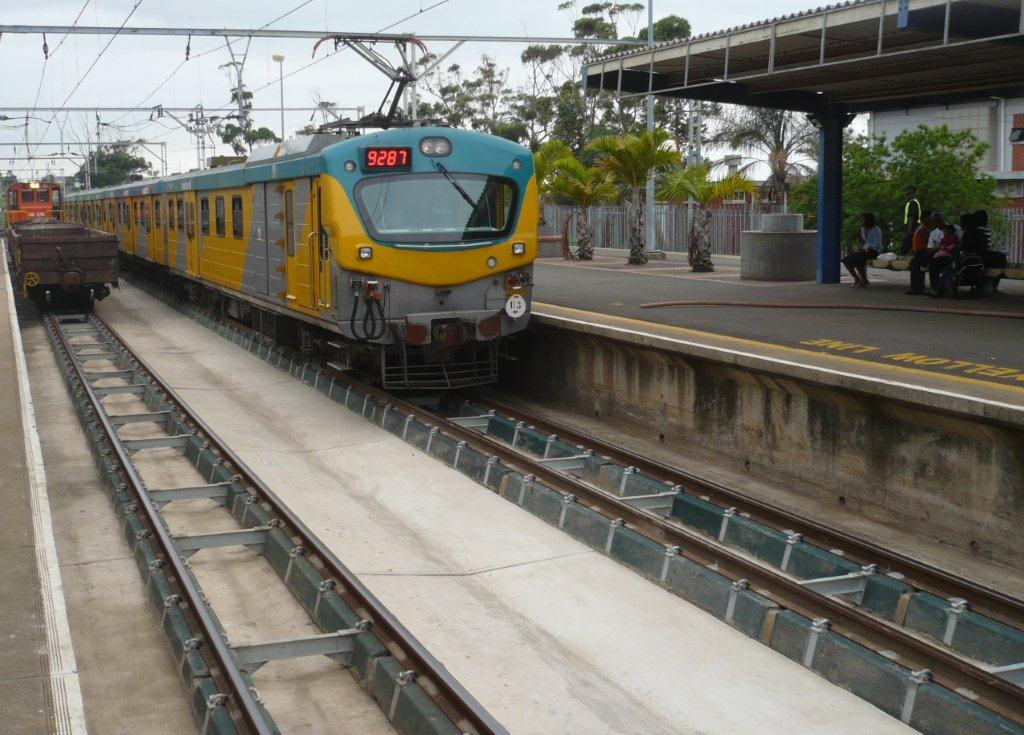

Overview
- Owner: PRASA
- Transit type: Commuter rail
- Number of lines: 7
- Annual ridership: 7 million (2023)
- Headquarters: 65 Masabalala Yengwa Avenue, Durban 4000
- Website: www.metrorail.co.za

Operation
- Operator: Metrorail

Technical
- System length: 255 km (158 mi)
- Track gauge: 1,067 mm (3 ft 6 in)
- Electrification: Overhead lines
System map
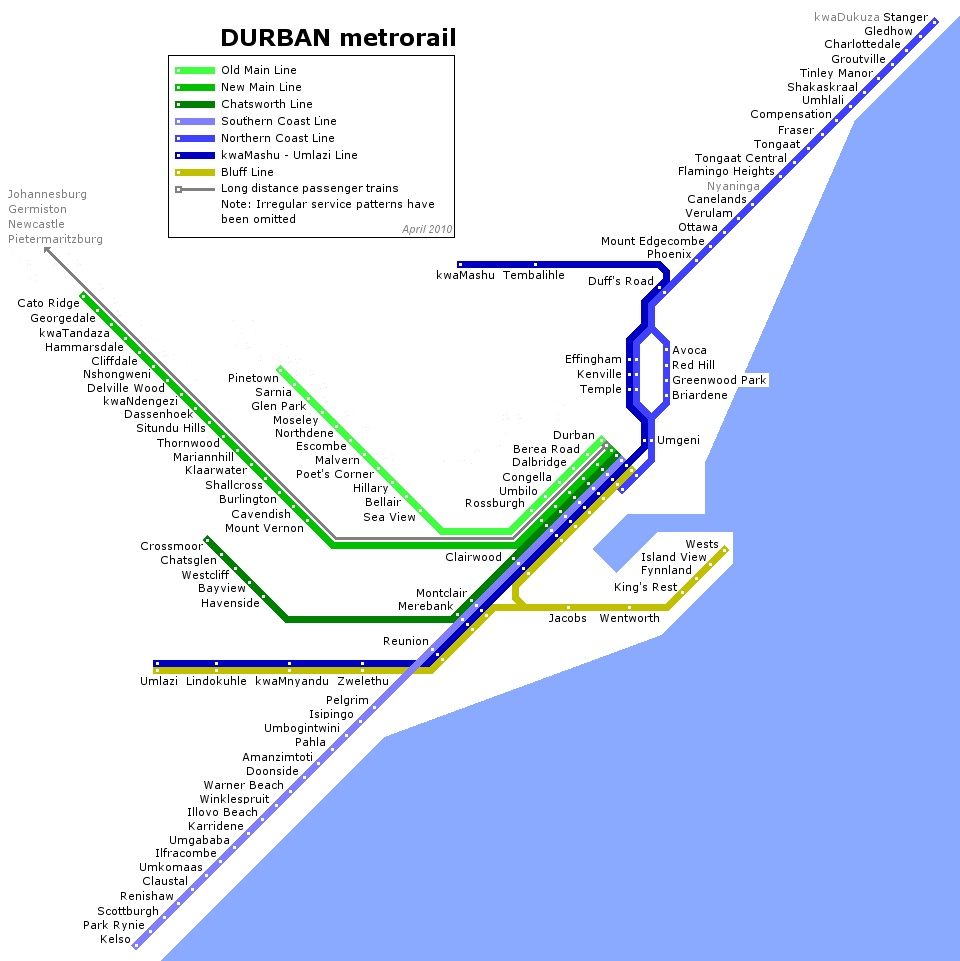

Metrorail KwaZulu-Natal is a network of commuter rail services in and around the city of Durban in KwaZulu-Natal province, South Africa. It is operated by Metrorail, a division of the Passenger Rail Agency of South Africa (PRASA).

Services are provided by electric multiple units of Class 5M2 and Class 10M. Most services pass through the two main stations in central Durban, Berea Road and Durban Station, except for those that operate from southern parts of Durban to Wests station on the Bluff.

== Lines ==
- The South Coast Line operates along the Indian Ocean coastline from Kelso through Scottburgh, Umkomaas, Amanzimtoti and Isipingo to central Durban.
- The Bluff Line operates from Wests station, along the Bluff to three different destinations: central Durban, Umlazi, and Chatsworth.
- The New Main Line operates from Cato Ridge through Mariannhill to central Durban.
- The Old Main Line operates from Pinetown through Queensburgh to central Durban.
- The North Coast Line operates the coastline from Stanger through Tongaat, Verulam and Durban North to central Durban.
- The KwaMashu-Umlazi Line operates from KwaMashu through central Durban to Umlazi.
- The Chatsworth Line operates from Chatsworth to central Durban.

== See also ==
- Durban
- Metrorail (South Africa)
