= Rail transport in South Africa =

External images
- The South African Railways "History, Scope and Organisation (1947)"
- The Cape Town Foreshore Plan (1947)
- Meet the South African Railways (1975)
- Meet the South African Railways (1979)
- A collection of SAR&H Publicity and Travel Department photographs

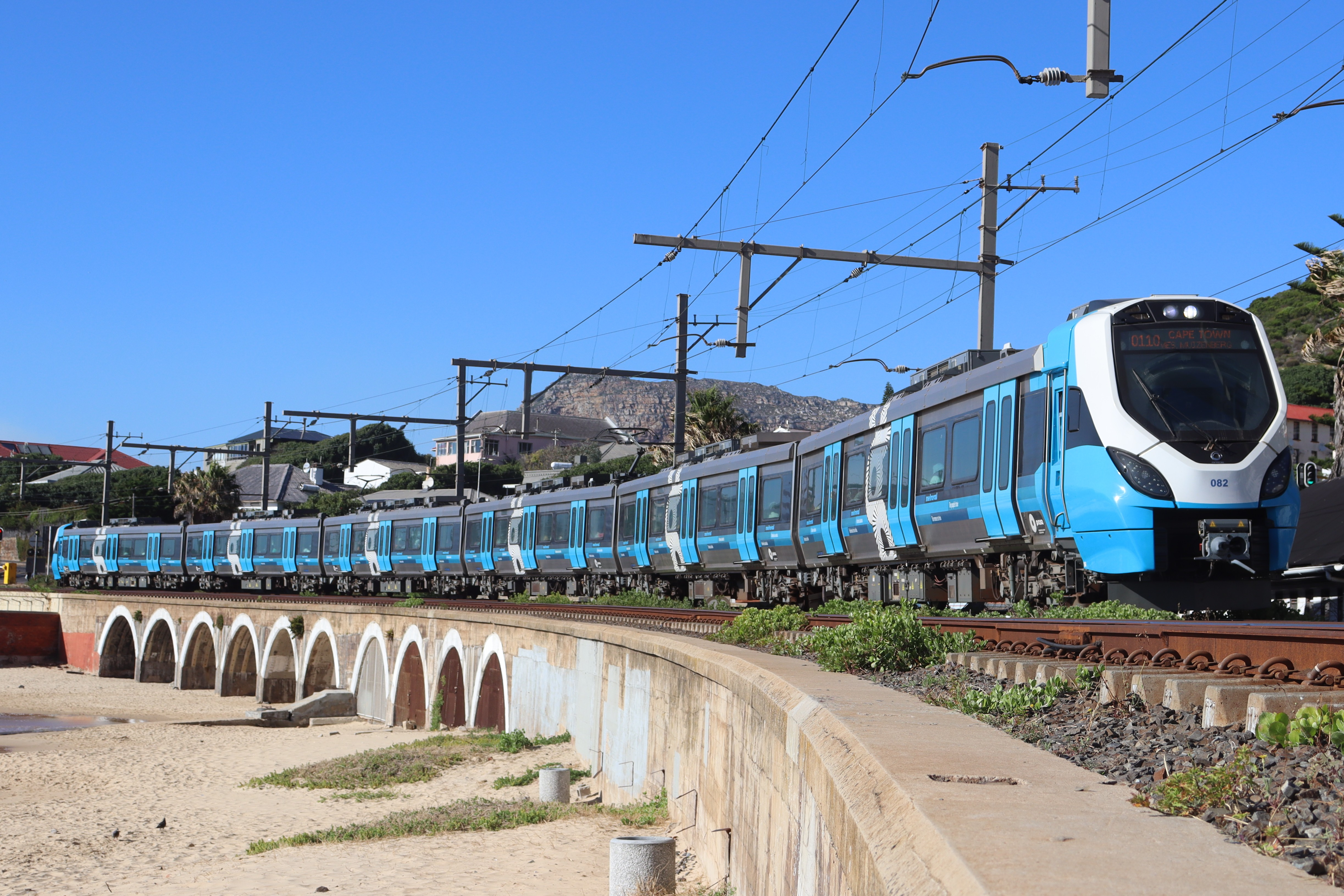
A Metrorail train pulling out of Kalk Bay station near Cape Town

Rail transport in South Africa is an important element of the country's transport infrastructure. All major cities are connected by rail, and at 36,000 km, the South African railway system is the longest and most highly developed in Africa.

Rail infrastructure in South Africa is publicly-owned, and administered via government entity Transnet and its subsidiaries, such as PRASA in the case of passenger rail and Protekon for railway maintenance.

In recent years, South Africa's rail network has been significantly improved. In 2026, a National Rail Master Plan was approved by the South African Department of Transport, with the goal of modernizing the country's rail services, using a budget of R1.3 trillion. It included the devolution of commuter rail services to metropolitan areas, through their respective local Metrorail divisions.

== History ==
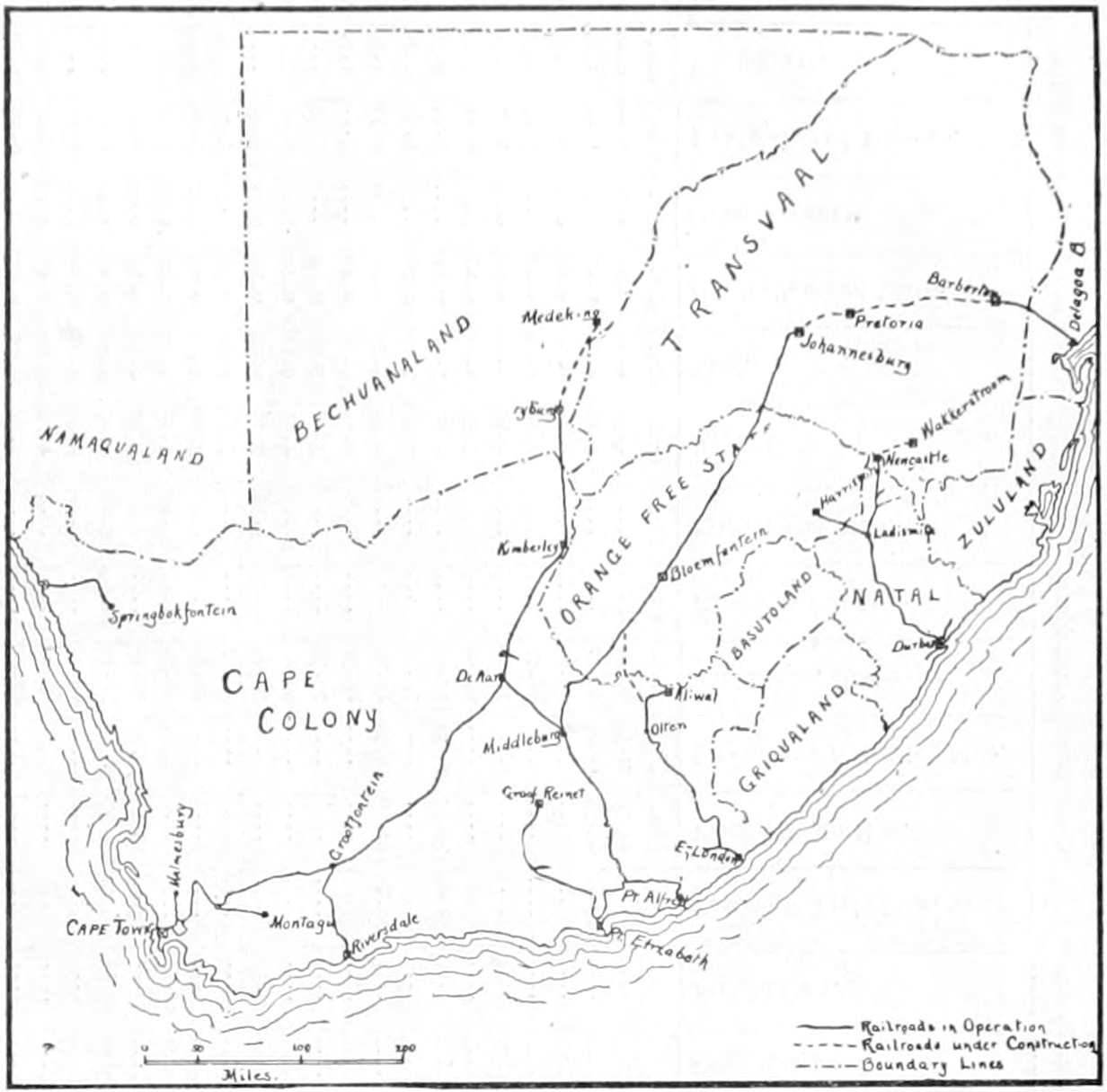
Rail network in 1892

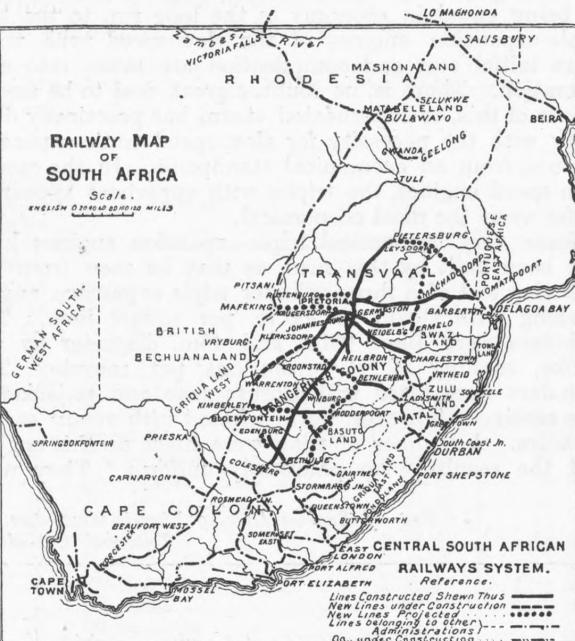
Rail network in 1906

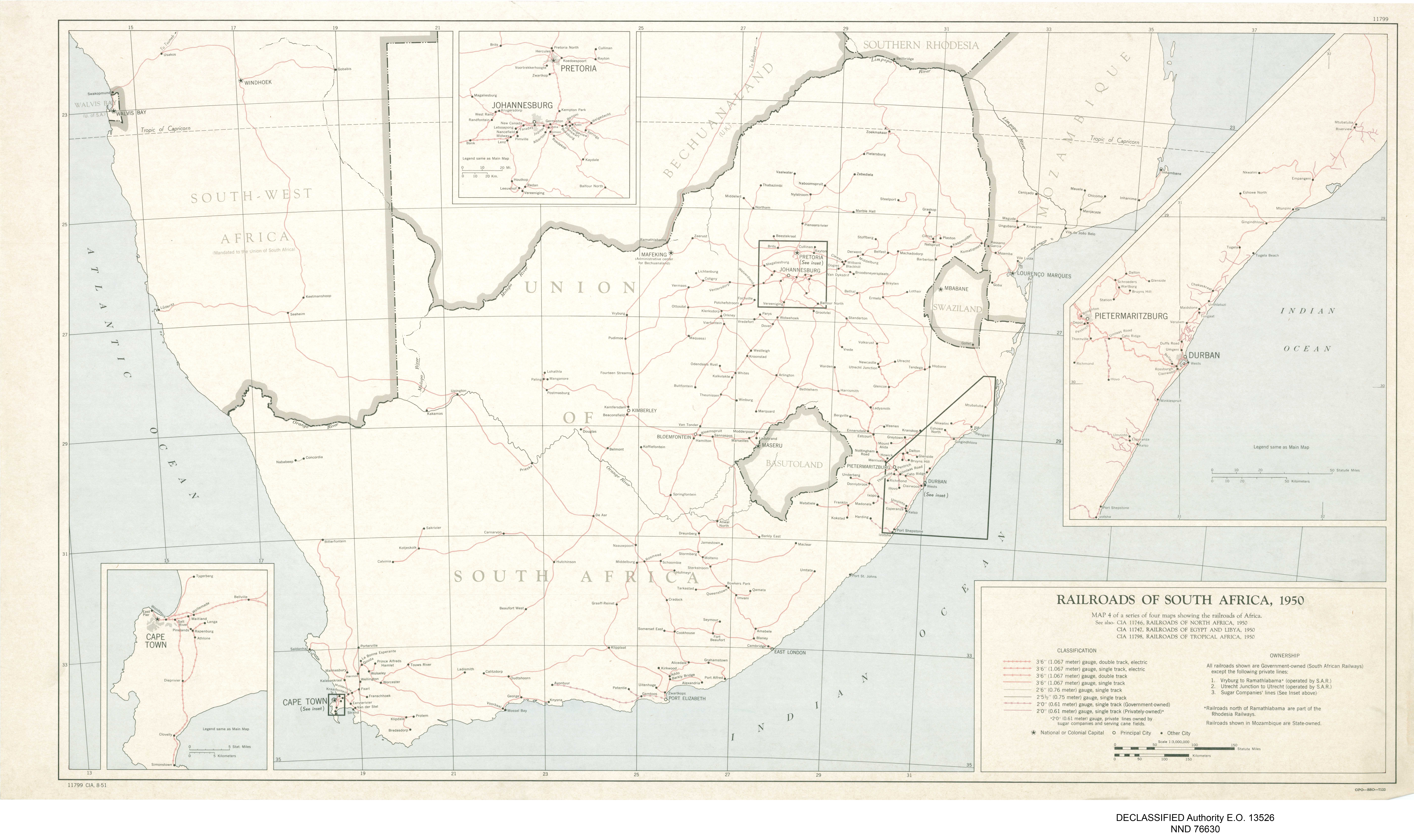
Rail network in 1950

The first passenger-carrying and goods service in South Africa was a small line of about 3.2 kilometres (2 mi) built by the Natal Railway Company, linking the town of Durban with Harbour Point, opened on 26 June 1860.

Cape Town had already started building a 72-kilometre (45 mi) 1,435 mm (4 ft 8 1/2 in) track gauge line, linking Cape Town to Wellington, in 1858 but was hampered by delays and could only begin service to the first section of the line to the Eerste River on 13 February 1862. However, Cape railway construction began a massive expansion after the formation of the Cape Government Railways in 1872.

In the north, in the independent South African Republic, the Netherlands-South African Railway Company (NZASM) constructed railways: one from Pretoria to Lourenço Marques (today's Maputo) in Portuguese East Africa Colony (modern-day Mozambique) and a shorter line connecting Pretoria to Johannesburg.

Later railway development was driven by Cecil Rhodes, whose original intention was for a railway extending across Africa as a great Cape-Cairo Railway, linking all the British territories of Africa. However, Rhodes was as much a capitalist in his motivation as a visionary.

When little gold was found in Mashonaland in southern Rhodesia, he accepted that the scheme to reach Lake Tanganyika had no economic justification. Railways built by private companies without government subsidies need enough traffic to pay high freight rates and recover construction costs.

The agricultural products that fuelled much of Rhodesia's early economic growth could not provide this traffic; large quantities of minerals could. Most early railways in Africa were built by the British government rather than by private companies—the need to raise capital and produce dividends prevented most companies from undertaking such infrastructure investments.

However, in the early period of railway construction, the British South Africa Company (BSAC) obtained finance from South African companies, including Consolidated Gold Fields and De Beers, in which Rhodes was a dominant force. BSAC also benefited from Rhodes's fortunes before his death. The railway terminating at Mafeking was extended to Bulawayo by October 1897. The first train arrived in Victoria Falls on the Zambezi in 1904, driven by two women.

A national "link-up" was established in 1898, creating a national transport network. This national network was largely completed by 1910. Though railway lines were also being extended outside of South Africa, as far north as Northern Rhodesia (present-day Zambia), the vision of Cecil John Rhodes, to have a rail system that would run from the "Cape to Cairo", would never materialise.

Upon the merger of four provinces to establish the modern state of South Africa in 1910, the railway lines across the country were also merged. South African Railways and Harbours (SAR & H) was the government agency responsible for, amongst other things, the country's rail system.

Electrification of the railways began in the 1920s with the building of the Colenso Power Station for the Glencoe-Pietermaritzburg route, and the introduction of the South African Class 1E.

The compounding factors of lacking exploitable oil reserves and economic difficulties stemming from international sanctions led to a major rolling electrification programme starting in the late 1960s continuing in to the late 1980s resulting in just over 80% (29,000km) of the network being electrified.

During the 1980s, the transport industry was reorganised. Instead of being a direct government agency, it was modelled along business lines into a government-owned corporation called Transnet. Transnet Freight Rail is the division of Transnet that runs the rail system. Though there are no plans to end government ownership of the national rail network, some small portions of the rail system have recently been privatised.

During the COVID-19 pandemic in South Africa, the rail system suffered looting. Lack of proper maintenance has also impaired the functioning of the railway system.

After years of degradation in rail system performance South Africa's rail network has been significantly improved, and state-owned entity Transnet has experienced a successful turnaround, resulting in increased revenue. In 2026, the South African Department of Transport announced its National Rail Master Plan. A budget of R1.3 trillion is planned to be allocated for modernizing the country's rail network, and includes the devolution of commuter rail services to metropolitan areas. This is something petitioned for by the City of Cape Town for many years.

== Network ==
The rail network of South Africa

Two public companies operate freight and commuter services, respectively: Transnet Freight Rail and PRASA. Transnet Freight Rail is the largest division of Transnet, a state-owned company wholly owned by the Government of the Republic of South Africa, and the custodian of rail, ports, and pipelines.

The passenger network is divided into urban commuter and long-distance routes. Metrorail, the urban commuter transport service present in Gauteng, Western Cape, KwaZulu-Natal, and Eastern Cape, is responsible for transporting up to 2 million passengers daily.

With the increasing coverage that the nation's highway system provides, long-distance passenger travel has declined in South Africa. While many commuters still use rail for their daily commute, nationally, only half of the nation's 36,000 kilometres (22,000 mi) of track is being fully utilised, and some 35% of the nation's track carries no activity or very low activity. Accordingly, Transnet is moving towards an emphasis on freight, rather than passengers, to keep its rail system profitable.

Shosholoza Meyl, a division of PRASA, used to operate long-distance routes covering the major cities in the country: Johannesburg, Cape Town, Durban, Gqerberha (Port Elizabeth) and East London. However, after a train collision killed one person in Horizon View west of Johannesburg on 12 February 2020, the Railway Safety Regulator suspended all Shosholoza Meyl train operations indefinitely. The reactivation of the service between Johannesburg and Cape Town, planned for 24 July 2024, has been delayed until further notice due to rail damage. The reactivation of the service between Johannesburg and Musina is announced for 30 August 2024. But the frequency will be very low; only one couple of trains per week is offered.

The Blue Train is a luxurious passenger train and a popular tourist attraction for South Africa, which runs from Cape Town to Pretoria. It was the winner of the most luxurious train in Africa for the tenth consecutive year in 2019 and the three-time winner of the world's most luxurious train at the World Travel Awards.

A high-speed rail link has been proposed, between Johannesburg and Durban.

== Specifications ==
Almost all railways in South Africa use a 1,067 mm (3 ft 6 in) Cape gauge track. This was selected in the 19th century to reduce the cost of building tracks across and through the mountains in several parts of the country.

The Gautrain rapid transit railway uses 1,435 mm (4 ft 8 1/2 in) (standard gauge).

Numerous two-foot narrow gauge railways were constructed during the late 19th and early 20th centuries.

South African trains connect through the AAR coupler, developed in the United States at the end of the 19th century. Although South Africa has long been ahead of Europe in coupling systems, it has lagged behind most of the world in its braking system; most trains in South Africa continue to use vacuum braking. However, the conversion to air brakes has finally commenced.

Between 50% and 80% of the rail lines in South Africa are electrified. Different voltages are used for different types of trains. Most electrified trains run 3 kV DC (overhead); this is used primarily for commuter lines and has been in use since the 1920s. During the 1980s, higher voltages (25 kV AC and—much less frequently—50 kV AC (both overhead) have been used for heavy-duty lines (which also require more railroad ties per mile) primarily used for the transport of iron ore.

== Rolling stock ==
South Africa uses a variety of rolling stock from several manufacturers.

In 1957, Union Carriage & Wagon was founded in Nigel for local production of rolling stock.

In recent years, for commuter rail, South Africa has procured rolling stock from Gibela, a partnership between South African uBumbano Rail and French Alstom. The co-owned, local entity produces the X'Trapolis Mega electric multiple unit, used on Metrorail commuter rail networks. As of 2026, the modern trains are in the process of replacing much of Metrorail's old stock.

The Mega trains are modular, with wide doors on both sides of carriages, WiFi, real-time communication services, air-conditioning, and spacious interiors. They are capable of traveling at 120 km/h, but can be upgraded to run at 160 km/h. Gibela plans to export units to other countries.

== Accidents and incidents ==
- 19 February 1896, a freight train loaded with eight trucks of dynamite was struck by a shunter while unloading. The resulting Braamfontein Explosion was one of the largest artificial non-nuclear explosions in history, killing more than 70 people and injuring over 200.
- 2 February 2002, 24 people died in the 2002 Charlotte's Dale train collision
- 26 October 2005, 2005 Deelfontein train collision, head-on collision between the Blue Train and the Shosholoza Meyl
- 13 November 2006, Faure level crossing accident, 19 people were killed at a level crossing near Somerset West when a metrorail train collided with a truck carrying farm workers.
- 21 April 2010, 3 crew died in the Pretoria runaway of a Rovos Rail train
- 25 August 2010, Blackheath level crossing accident, ten children died as a result of a level crossing crash between a Metrorail commuter train and a minibus taxi.
- 13 July 2012. Hectorspruit level crossing accident, at least 25 people were killed at a level crossing near Hectorspruit, Mpumalanga, when a coal train collided with a truck carrying farm workers.
- Saturday, 18 July 2015. Johannesburg train crash: Two commuter trains collided and overturned in Johannesburg. ~200 people were injured.

== Rail systems in nearby countries ==
The following countries mostly use 1,067 mm (3 ft 6 in) gauge and are mostly connected. Countries beyond those listed are of other gauges.

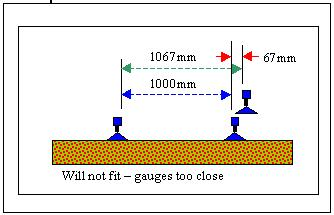
Dual Gauge Africa 3 Rail Impossible

Dual gauge Africa 4 rail 2 gauge

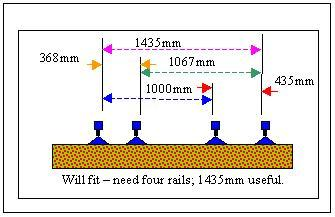
Dual Gauge Africa 4 Rail 3 Gauge

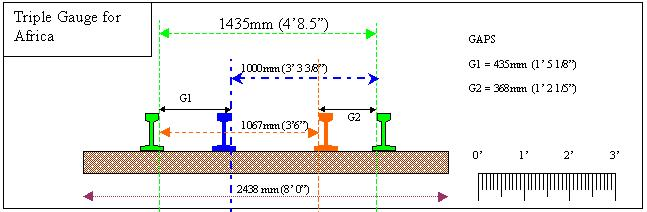
Triple Gauge Africa

- Angola
- Botswana
- Republic of the Congo – isolated
- Democratic Republic of the Congo – half isolated
- Eswatini
- Lesotho
- Malawi
- Mozambique (Pretoria–Maputo railway), under repair
- Namibia
- Tanzania same gauge as far as Dar es Salaam –
  transshipment to 1,000 mm (3 ft 3 3/8 in) gauge at Kidatu
- Zambia
- Zimbabwe

== See also ==
- Two foot gauge railways in South Africa
- AfricaRail
- Avontuur Railway
- Cape Government Railways
- Cape gauge
- Flying Dutchman Funicular
- Kei Rail
- Metrorail
- Natal Government Railways
- Netherlands-South African Railway Company
- Shosholoza Meyl
- South African locomotive history
- Transport in South Africa
- Logistics in South Africa
- Passenger Rail Agency of South Africa
- Transnet
- Rovos Rail
- Gautrain
