= X'Trapolis Mega =

South African electric multiple unit

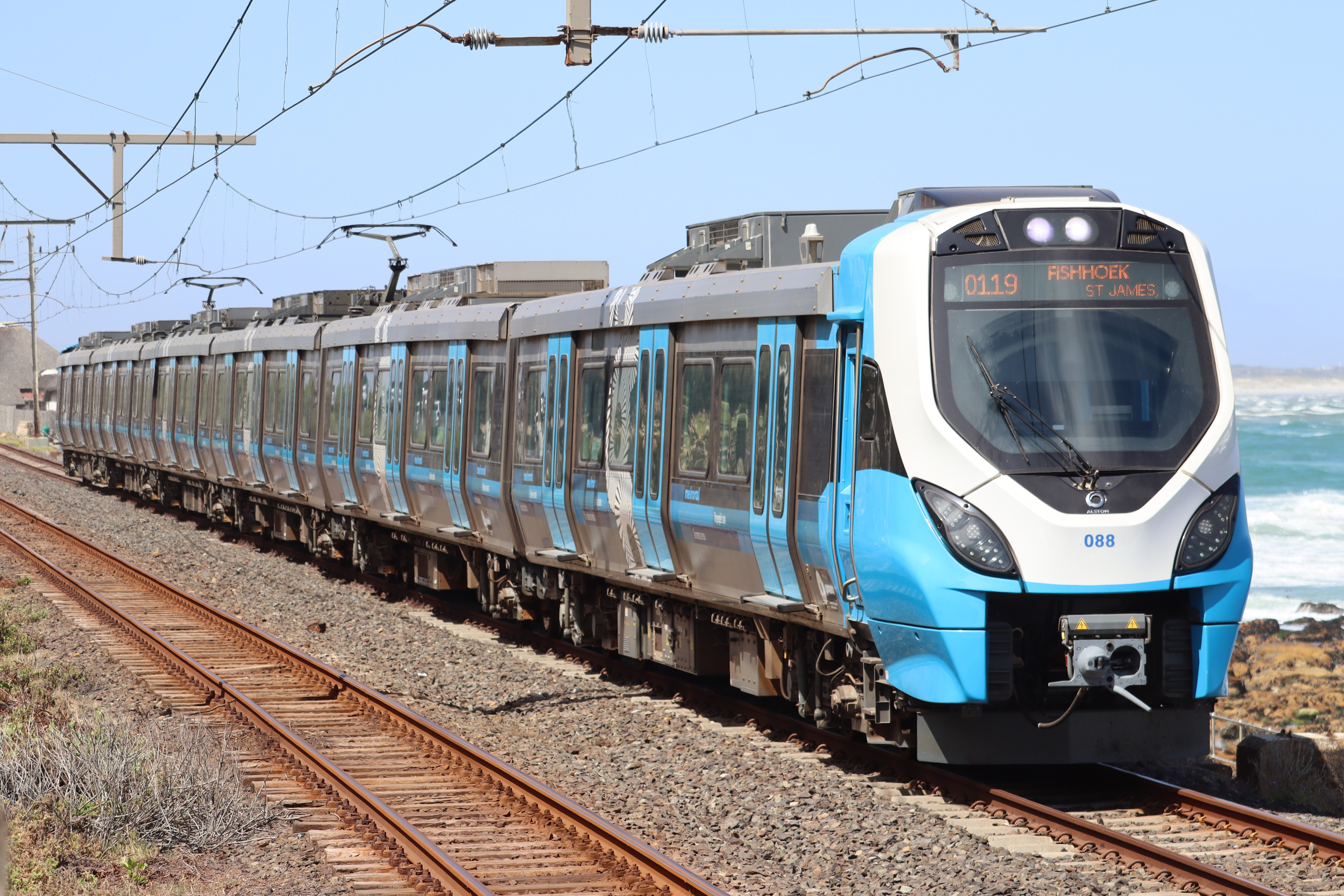
- X'Trapolis Mega running southwards on the Southern Line in Cape Town, Western Cape, South Africa
- Stock type: Electric multiple unit (EMU)
- In service: 2017–Present
- Manufacturers: Gibela (70% owned by Alstom, and 30% owned by Ubumbano Rail)
- Assembly: São Paulo, Brazil (2015–2016); Ekurhuleni, South Africa (since 2017)
- Family name: X'Trapolis
- Replaced: Class 5M2; Class 8M; Class 10M
- Constructed: 2015–Present
- Number built: 268 (March 2025)
- Formation: 6 cars per EMU
- Capacity: Seated: 234–380; Seated + standing: 1088–1218
- Operator: PRASA
- Depots: Durban; Germiston; Salt River; Wolmerton
- Line served: Metrorail

Specifications
- Car body construction: Stainless steel, FRP in front face
- Train length: 131.5 metres (431 ft)
- Car length: 21.5 metres (71 ft)
- Width: 2.75 metres (9.0 ft)
- Floor height: 1.10 metres (3.6 ft)
- Platform height: 1.07 metres (3.5 ft)
- Doors: 6, wide double doors
- Wheel diameter: 840–770 mm (33–30 in) (new–worn)
- Wheelbase: 2.4 m (7 ft 10 in)
- Maximum speed: Service: 120 km/h (75 mph); Design: 160 km/h (99 mph)
- Traction motors: Alstom 6 ECA 3022 A 320 kW (430 hp)
- Acceleration: 0.85 m/s^{2} (2.8 ft/s^{2})
- HVAC: Air conditioning
- Electric systems: 3,000 V DC (nominal) from overhead catenary
- Bogies: Alstom CL 606
- Minimum turning radius: 90 metres (300 ft)
- Braking system: Regenerative braking
- Safety system: Automatic Train Operation (ATO)
- Headlight type: LED
- Seating: Longitudinal
- Track gauge: 1,067 mm (3 ft 6 in)

Notes/references
- Sources: Gibela, PRASA

The X'Trapolis Mega is an electric multiple unit (EMU), and part of the X'Trapolis family. It is built in South Africa by Gibela, a joint venture between French company Alstom and South African company Ubumbano Rail, for the Passenger Rail Agency of South Africa (PRASA). The Mega operates as part of daily Metrorail commuter service in major metropolitan areas across South Africa.

During October 2013, a R51 billion (€4 billion, $4.46 billion) contract for the supply of 600 X'Trapolis Mega trainsets, including a local production arrangement, was signed by Alstom and PRASA.

The majority of the vehicles are to be domestically assembled at a new facility in Dunnottar, established by Gibela, over the course of ten years. During December 2016, local testing of the first trainsets commenced. In May 2017, 13 trainsets began operating revenue-generating services along Pretoria-based routes.

It is anticipated that the X'Trapolis Mega will replace the majority of PRASA's existing rolling stock, much of which dates back to the 1950s.

== Development ==
The X'Trapolis Mega is marketed and produced by Gibela, a joint venture headed by Alstom and otherwise populated by several South African companies.

On 5 December 2012, Passenger Rail Agency of South Africa (PRASA) Chief Executive Lucky Montana and Transport Minister Dikobe Ben Martins announced that Gibela had been selected as the preferred bidder for the first of two ten-year contracts for a large R51 billion (€4 billion, $4.46 billion) order.

Tendered for by PRASA, this order called for the production and delivery of 600 Mega trainsets, comprising 3,600 units, to be delivered between 2015 and 2025, as well as the first 18 years of fleet maintenance.

Other bidders included CSR-Wictra, Bombardier, Dudula Rail, China CNR, CSR EMU Supply, and CAF. During October 2013, it was announced that the contract for the deal has been signed, clearing the way for production to proceed. During July 2014, the contract's financial closure was concluded.

Under the terms of this sizeable contract, Gibela are to undertake the construction of a local manufacturing facility. This factory is located in Dunnottar (between Nigel and Springs), around 50 km to the east of the city of Johannesburg. While the contract has stipulated that a minimum of 65 per cent of the train's content is to be locally produced, Gibela has claimed that it is to achieve 69 per cent by the second year of production on the order.

The order was reportedly placed by PRASA with the stated aim of stimulating a revolution within South Africa's existing mass transit network; in excess of 8,000 jobs are to be directly created by the arrangement, in line with the South African government’s policy of skill development.

To support this aim, Gibela agreed to spend R746 million on rail sector business development, R273 million on wider socioeconomic development and R797 million on personal skills development. Depots for the new trains are to be procured separately to this arrangement.

The first 20 X'Trapolis Mega trainsets were built by Alstom at their facilities in Lapa, São Paulo, Brazil; during May 2015, the first six-car trainset was completed. Following the delivery of the remaining Brazil-built units, the following 580 EMUs were to be built at Gibela's new Dunnottar production line over the course of ten years.

== Service history ==
The X'Trapolis Mega trainsets serve as the first phase of a major fleet renewal project; in the long term, it is planned for the type to replace Metrorail's entire fleet, the majority of its prior rolling stock having been manufactured during the 1950s. In revenue service, they are normally operated as either four-carriage or six-carriage trainsets.

At one point, testing in South Africa was originally intended to take place during early 2016, ahead of revenue service beginning in June. However, domestic testing did not commence until December 2016, about a year following the delivery of first trainset. During May 2017, 13 trainsets commenced revenue service on Pretoria-based routes, marking the type's entry to service.

Early on, the fleet was performing a total of 146 trips per day during both peak and off-peak hours. In November 2017, an agreement was signed between PRASA and SNCF for the latter to provide support in the commissioning and deploying of the X'Trapolis Mega fleet in a service-ready condition; this arrangement included the deployment of SNCF staff in South Africa.

== Design ==
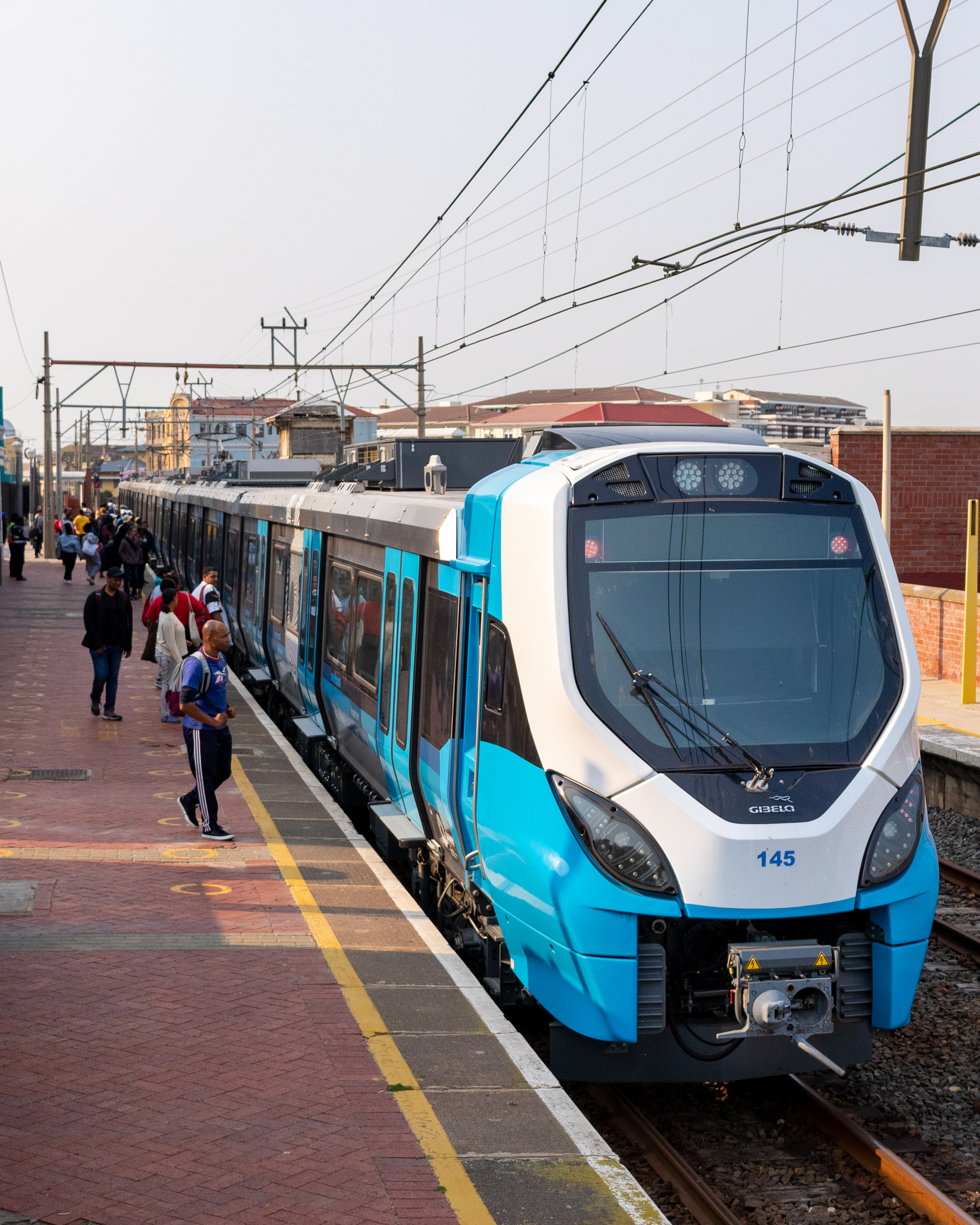
X'Trapolis Mega at Muizenberg Station

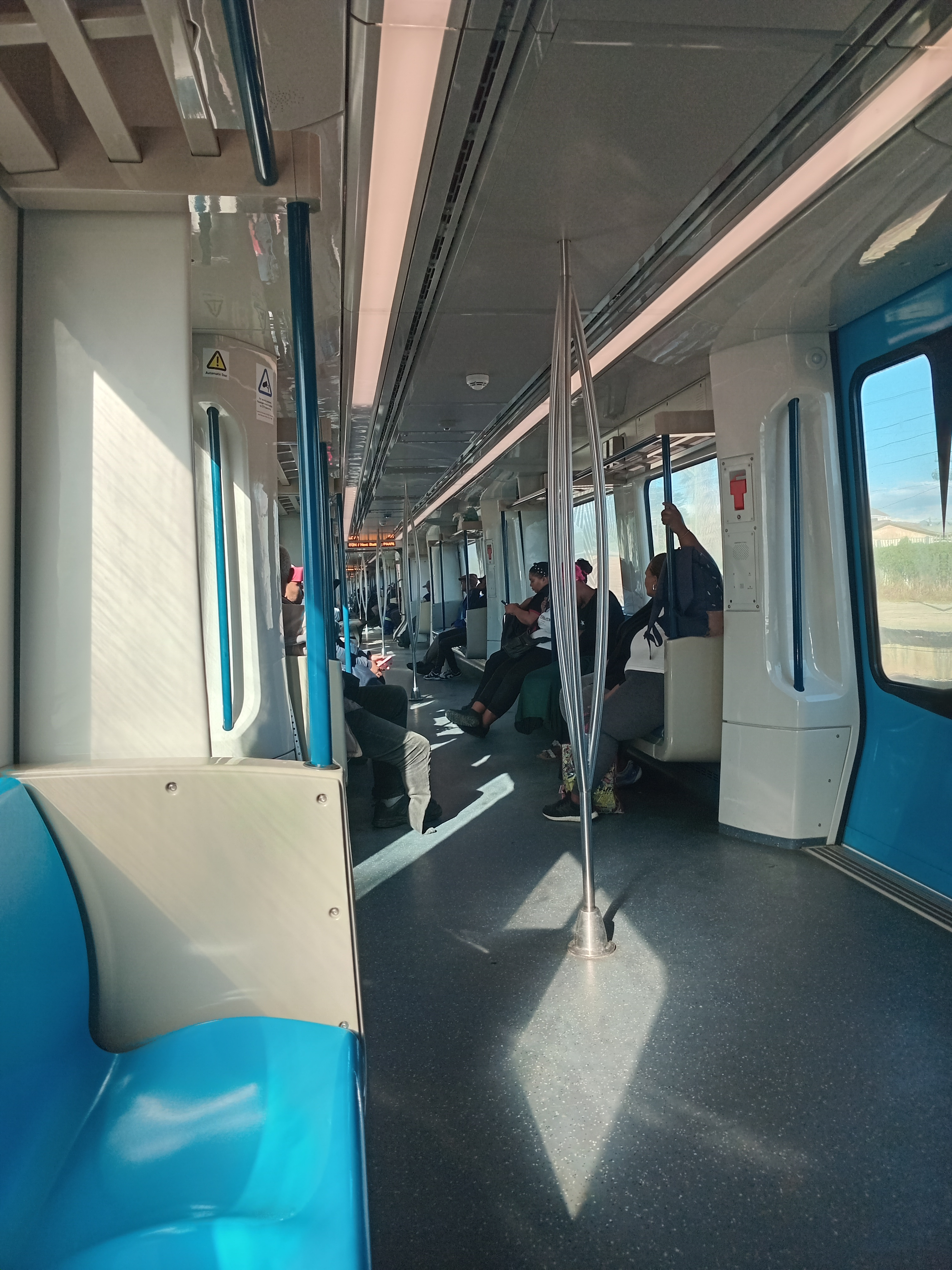
The interior of the X'Trapolis Mega

The X'Trapolis Mega is a member of the X'Trapolis family of trains, produced by French rolling stock manufacturer Alstom; the Mega is designed to be compatible with South Africa's Cape gauge.

It has been claimed that the vehicle consumes 31% less energy in comparison to its legacy counterparts, which has been attributed to its light-weight construction, achieved in turn via a stainless steel structure and the adoption of insulated gate bipolar transistor (IGBT)-based regenerative braking system. The vehicle is designed to be compliant with the EN 15227 crashworthiness standard for greater survivability in the event of an accident.

The X'Trapolis Mega is equipped with an automatic train operation (ATO) signalling system; this facility enables it to optimally navigate through highly-trafficked networks and reduce the impact of congestion. It has been reportedly designed to serve up to 30,000 passengers per hour in either direction along the network.

The design of the train embraces modularity, reliability and high capacity, while the vehicle itself is intended to be applied to suburban and regional transport roles. The Mega can normally attain a maximum service speed of 120 km/h, however, it is reportedly possible for the train to be upgraded to be capable of reaching up to 160 km/h instead.

The Mega has been offered with a range of modular options, such as different train lengths, either single-decker or double-decker configurations, variable carriage width and adjustable number of doors. The vehicles built for PRASA feature three external sliding double-doors on each side of every carriage, while the interior is furnished with a modular seating arrangement.

The adoption of wide doors is said to enable better passenger flow during rush hour conditions. In the selected configuration, a seating capacity of 234 to 380 can be achieved, along with a seating/standing passenger capacity of between 1,088 and 1,218. Each trainset is provided with two universal accessibility-friendly toilets, while each carriage can readily accommodate two wheel chair users.

The X'Trapolis Mega features a relatively spacious interior to allow passengers to easily flow around the inside of each carriage; movement between carriages is facilitated via full-length connecting gangways. Efforts have been made to ease both the boarding and alighting process through the adoption of fairly wide doorways and the presence of step-free carriage entrances. Each carriage is furnished with comfort measures, including air conditioning systems and ergonomic seating; while areas specifically designed for people with reduced mobility have also been provided.

Large exterior windows have been fitted to give the travelling public a level of improved visibility. Various modern interfaces and communication systems have also been provided for passengers, including Wi-Fi internet connectivity, real-time service information displays, on-board entertainment systems, and real-time ground communication facilities.
