= South African Class 10M =

South African electric multiple unit class

The South African Class 10M is a series of electric multiple units used on commuter services operated by the Passenger Rail Agency of South Africa's Metrorail division. Divided into the 10M3, 10M4 and 10M5 subclasses, the 10M sets were rebuilt from old South African Class 5M2A coaches stripped to the underframe and used as the base. The rebuild programme started in 1999.

== 10M3 ==
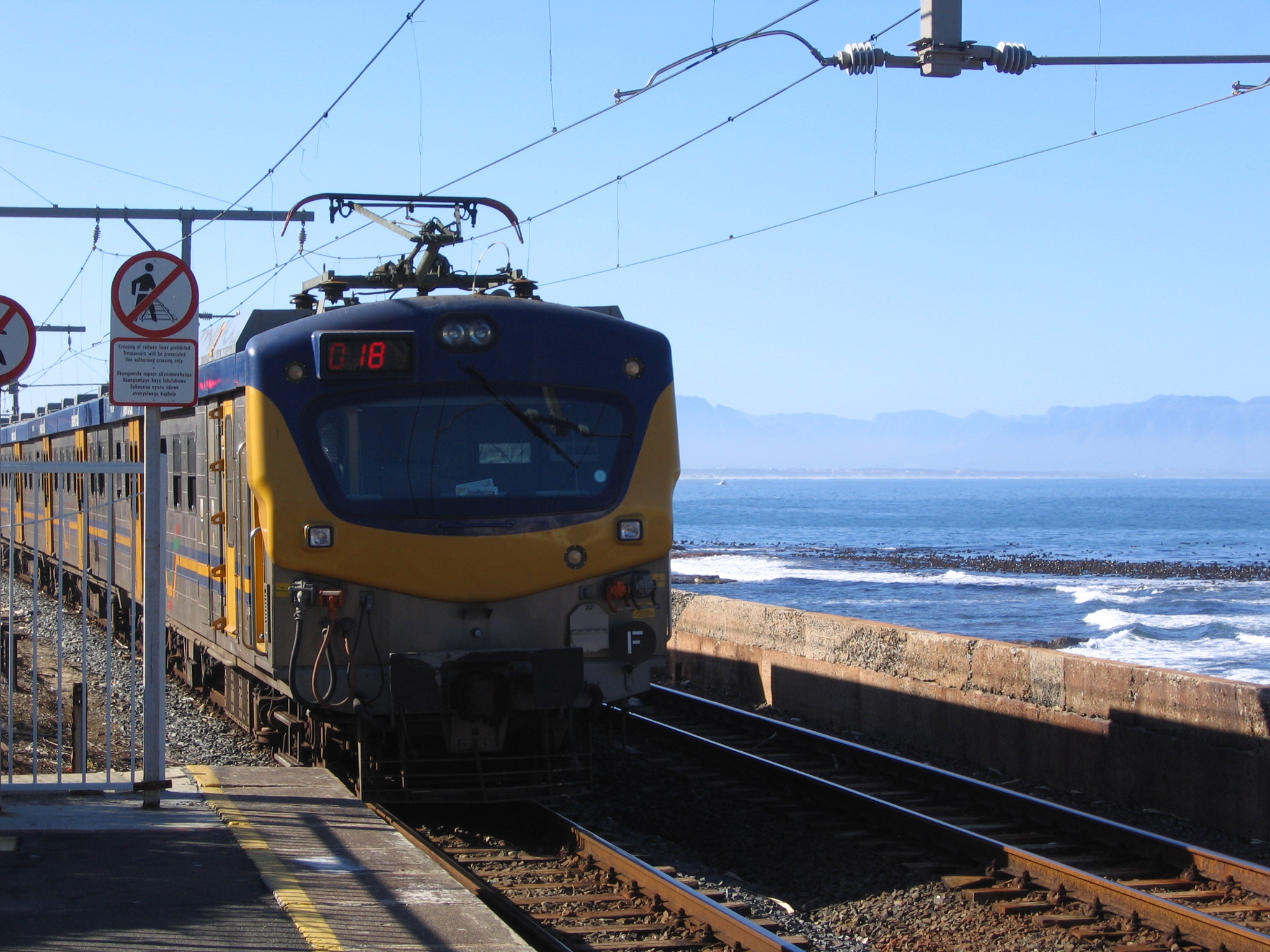
A Class 10M3 Train pulling into Kalk Bay Railway Station on the Southern Line in Cape Town

The Class 10M3 trains were delivered to Cape Town in 2002, which were built by Bombardier and Transwerk and were tested on the 12 May 2003. According to the corporation's chief engineer, Bill Potgieter, the original contract was for 11 trains of 8 coaches each, with the last train being delivered in August of that year. Out of 2097 people surveyed on that day, 47% said they "liked it", 37% said they "liked it very much" and only 15% of people had been critical towards the train. Potgieter stated that some commuters were upset due to "uncomfortable" seating, being the same as the old Metro Class ones; some commuters thought the seats were slippery; some thought that there was a lack of privacy; and some wanted a smoking area. There were positive responders who liked the increased space and clean coaches, as well as the lack of class distinction. In terms of improvements, the coaches were fitted with a PA system, saloon doors had been painted yellow to assist visually-impaired commuters, the doorways had been cleared for allowing wheelchair access, the seats were vandal-resistant, grab poles and parcel racks had been reduced to promote airflow. The 10M3 used microprocessor control, chopper control and regenerative brakes, in addition to the existing vacuum brakes. Interior lighting is provided by modular fluorescent lights. The 10M3 distinguished itself from other trains by featuring stainless steel bodies.

== 10M4 ==
The first set of Class 10M4 trains were delivered to Gauteng in late 2001, jointly built by Union Carriage & Wagon (UCW) and Siemens from two orders of 88 coaches. In terms of improvements, there were the same improvements found in the 10M3, as well as improved passenger comfort through lighting, better seating, ventilation, aesthetics, a new central-position driving cab and having compatibility with all Class 10M-type sets. There are two variations, Series 1 and Series 2.

== 10M5 ==
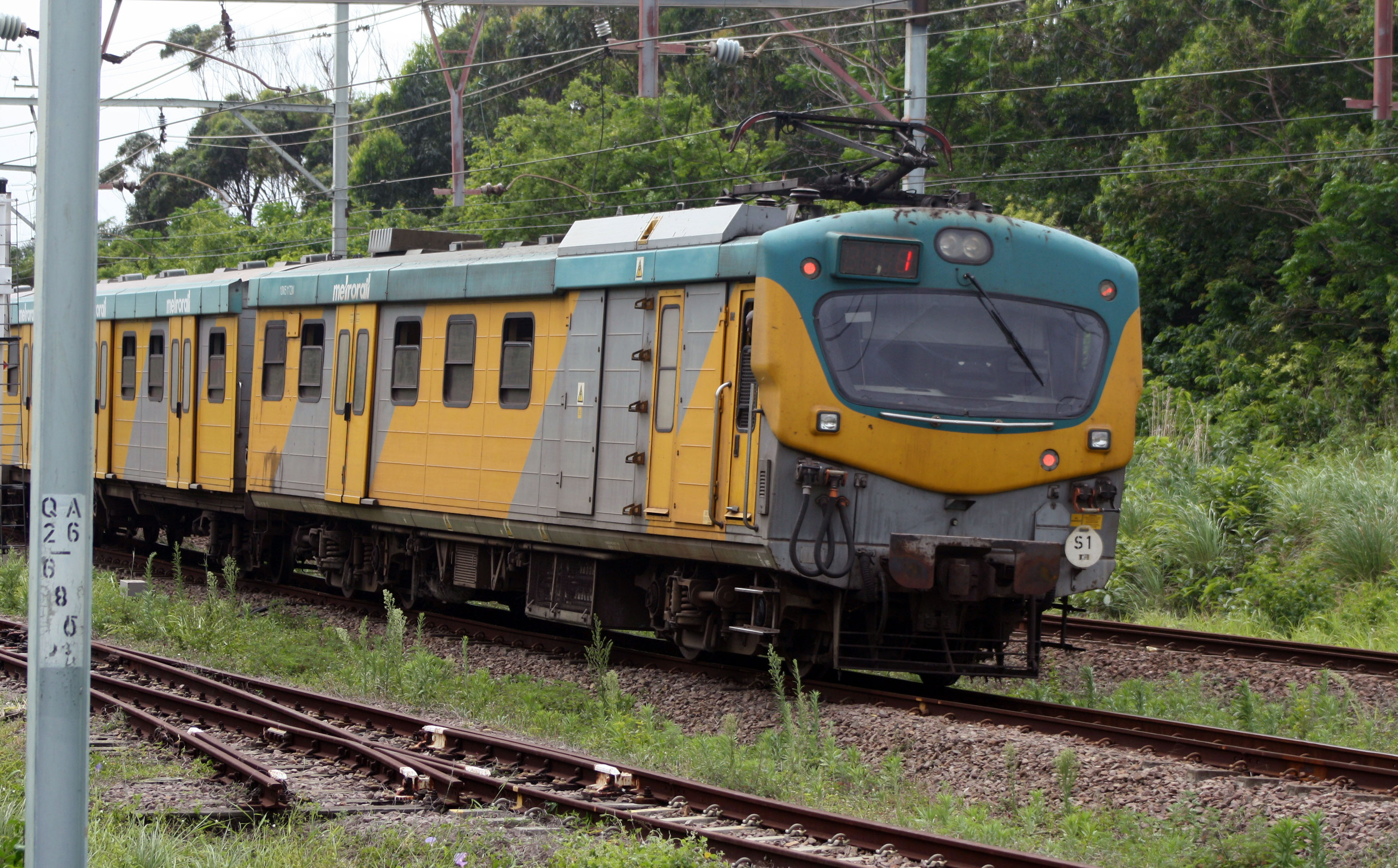
A 10M5 train on a commuter service in Durban

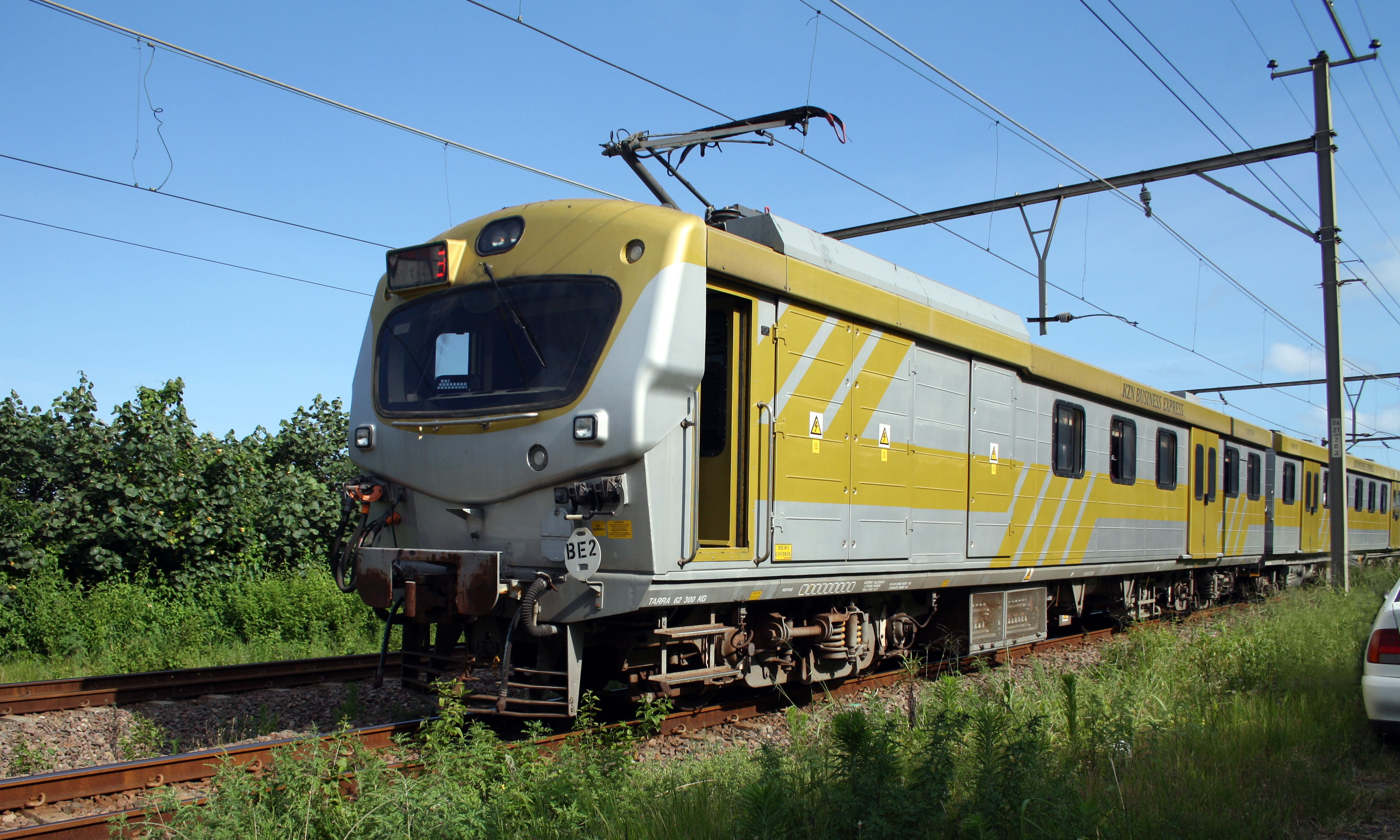
A 10M5 KZN Business Express Train

The Class 10M5 trains were launched on 20 November 2006 in Tshwane by the former Minister of Transport Jeff Radebe, where he suggested that the SARCC (Now PRASA) should operate their trains of 18 hours instead of the 10 hours at the time. He also announced there that to meet passenger needs for the 2010 FIFA World Cup, they would be refurbishing 1600 coaches that were operational at the time, having already invested R 40,000,000 into. These new trains had 3 doors per coach for "proper" passenger movement. On 5 September 2013, 48 Gauteng Metrorail 10M5s had been refurbished and unveiled at Naledi Station in Soweto by then Transport Minister Dipuo Peters. The R 1.8 billion programme include new bodies, better seating to provide passenger comfort, lighting and ventilation, as well as improved braking and electronic interiors. The year before, PRASA had announced that they would spend R 136 billion to get roughly 7000 new carriages, as well as upgrading and modernise train stations. Group CEO Lucky Montana stated that the first new trains were expected as early as 2015, with an average of 500 to 600 carriages being expected to be delivered annually until 2032.
