= South African Class 8M =

South African Railways Class 8M
- Stock type: Electric multiple unit
- In service: 1987–present
- Manufacturer: Nissho Iwai Corporation; DCD Group (body and bogies); Hitachi (electrical equipment)
- Constructed: 1987–1992
- Number built: 96 cars
- Formation: 4 cars
- Capacity: 64 (motor); 56 (trailer); 4,464 (crush load; full set)
- Operators: South African Railways; Metrorail

Specifications
- Car length: 22,940 mm (75 ft 3 in)
- Maximum speed: 110 km/h (68 mph)
- Weight: Motor: 47.4 t (46.7 long tons; 52.2 short tons); Trailer: 32.4 t (31.9 long tons; 35.7 short tons)
- Power output: 245 kW (329 hp) per motor
- Acceleration: 0.8 m/s (2.6 ft/s) (to 50 km/h (31 mph))
- Electric system(s): 3000 V DC overhead
- Current collector(s): Pantograph
- Wheels driven: 48
- Track gauge: 3 ft 6 in (1,067 mm) Cape gauge

The Class 8M are electric multiple units used by the South African Railways and later Metrorail. There are also three EMU classes that are related to the 8M: the prototypical Classes 6M and 7M, and the proposed Class 9M.

== Prototypes and development ==
=== Background ===
Since the 1950s, the South African Railways had been using the Class 5M2 on commuter and suburban routes, but by the 1980s, they were due for replacement. It was decided to import carriages from foreign manufacturers that used thyristor chopper control, which was more energy efficient than the resistor control used in the 5M2 class. Two prototype EMU classes, the 6M and the 7M, were introduced in 1983.

=== Class 6M ===
12 cars were built by Hitachi in Japan. These were formed into three car sets (two motors and one trailer) and could be mashed up into a 9-car set. The front of the train has an asymmetrical structure with the cab on the left and the destination board on the right. The body is made of lightweight stainless steel structure developed in-house by Hitachi, and is designed to withstand the UIC-regulated 200 ton end-of-car compressive load. Each carriage was four metres longer than a 5M2 car, increasing the passenger capacity, and the interior had air-conditioning installed, improving comfort.

The chopper control device used in the control system has been developed in-house to suit South African Railways' 3000 V DC voltage, which uses the M6 type, and is capable of controlling eight traction motors with a rated output of 245 kW, four of which are installed in each motor car. In addition, continuous control using frequency modulated waves is used as the control command from the cab, realizing completely stepless control.

After introduction, a comparative experiment was conducted between the 6M type electric train (12-car train with eight motors and four trailers) and the 5M2 type electric train (14-car train with four motors and 10 trailers). It was found that, although the number of passengers and the length of the train increased, the power consumption and maintenance costs were less compared to the 5M2 class, and it was reported that the amount of energy consumed could be reduced by 28.4%.

=== Class 7M ===
Siemens of Germany built twelve cars, known as the Class 7M. Structurally, they were similar to the Class 6M, but the train consists of four cars (two motors and two trailers), and other differences present such as the absence of the small window to the right of the destination indicator that was present on the 6M series.

The chopper control is equipped with a monitoring system that records signals emitted from the equipment and monitors for faults. It also reduces the number of components, improving manufacturing costs and reliability. Each motor car is equipped with four electric motors with an output of 290 kW.

== Class 8M ==
Experience from the 6M and 7M classes lead South African Railways to order an electric multiple unit model with thyristor chopper control from Nissho Iwai in 1985. While DCD Group constructed the carbody and bogies, Hitachi provided the electrical equipment. The resulting Class 8M shared the body and bogie designs as the 6M, but consists of two motor cars and two trailers, much like the 7M. In addition, the equipment on the 8M, including the control device, required less maintenance.

96 cars (24 four-car sets) were built between 1987 and 1992, and saw use primarily on the Western Cape lines in Cape Town. Since 2003, in order to improve reliability, reduce energy consumption, and extend the lifespan, refurbishment has been carried out to replace the control devices with variable-frequency drive using IGBT technology.

As of 2019, two of the trains are in service on the Central Line, being affectionately nicknamed "uSilver" by Khayelitsha commuters.

== Proposed evolution ==
The Class 9M was going to be introduced in 1997 as a derivative of the Class 8M, but due to the economic downturn in South Africa at the time, construction of these units was dropped in favour of refurbishing the existing Class 5M2 in order to reduce costs.

== Bibliography ==
- Quail, J.B. (May 1985). "The development of electric mass passenger transport in South Africa" (PDF). Elektron. 5 (2): 3–9. Archived from the original (PDF) on 23 January 2025.
- Allen, Geoffrey Freeman, ed. (1991). Jane's World Railways 1991-1992. Janes World Railways. Coulsdon: Jane's Transport Data. ISBN 0710609558 – via Internet Archive.
