= Autopax =

South African intercity bus operator

- A new (2026) Autopax City to City bus in Bellville, Western Cape
- Type: Division
- Industry: Transport
- Predecessors: South African Road Transport Services
- Founded: c. 1990; 36 years ago
- Headquarters: Pretoria, Gauteng, South Africa
- Areas served: Southern Africa
- Services: Intercity bus transit
- Parent: PRASA
- Website: prasa.com/autopax

Autopax is a South African bus transit division of state-owned transport and logistics company PRASA. It operates the intercity Translux and City to City services.

== History ==
Autopax Passenger Services (SOC) Ltd has its origins in the old state organization called the South African Road Transport Services that offered two services that at the time that were called Translux and Transtate.

In the 1990s, the company became part of Autonet, a division of South African state-owned transport and logistics company Transnet.

Autonet was later renamed Autopax Passenger Services Pty Ltd, and became part of South African state-owned transit operator PRASA, when the latter was established in March 2009.

In 2024, Autopax ceased operating as a subsidiary of PRASA, and the company became PRASA's new Long-Distance Passenger Transport division.

== See also ==
- Transport in South Africa
