= Johannesburg-Durban High Speed Rail =

Proposed rail system in South Africa

In April 2010, the South African Minister of Transport proposed a Johannesburg–Durban high-speed rail system. There are concerns about the cost and engineering difficulty of the project, which would have to cross the Drakensberg mountains. The project is expected to cost U$30 billion, but there are hopes that alternative funding sources will be available. China Railway Group says it is in talks with the South African government for construction contracts. In August of 2021, Transport Minister Fikile Mbalula announced that a feasibility study had begun into the transport corridor, with President Cyril Ramaphosa 's cabinet approving the framework for implementing the project in November 2023, highlighting the Johannesburg-Durban corridor as its main priority.

== Maps ==
- UN Map

== See also ==
- Rail transport in South Africa
- Durban
- Johannesburg
- Metrorail (South Africa)
