= Gibela =

French–South African railway rolling stock manufacturer

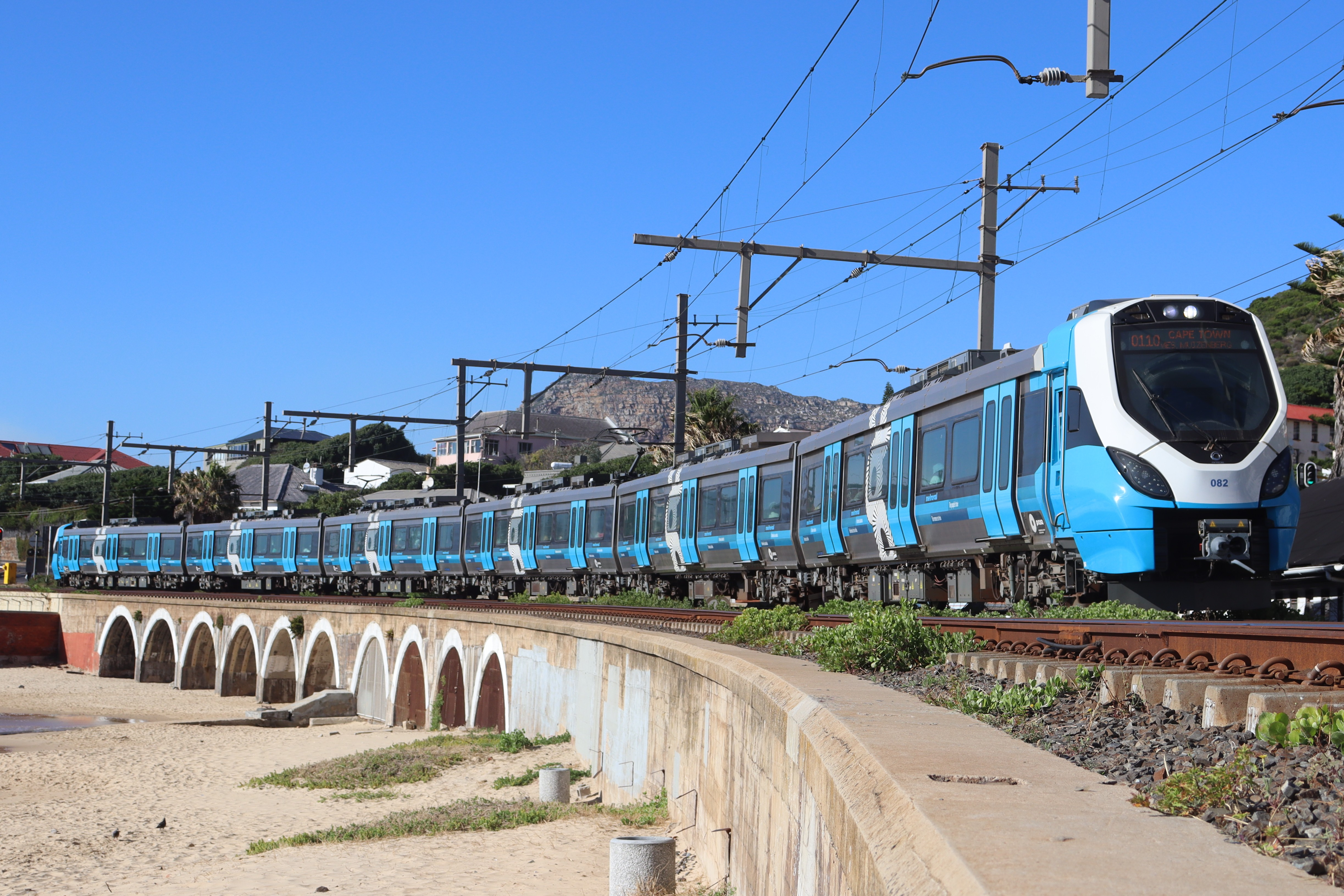
- X'Trapolis Mega train traveling over a bridge in Kalk Bay, Cape Town
- Industry: Rail manufacturing Transport
- Incorporated: 2012; 14 years ago
- Headquarters: Dunnottar, Ekurhuleni, Gauteng, South Africa
- Area served: South Africa
- Key people: Reggie Boqo (Acting CEO)Thabiso Komako (Incoming CEO)
- Products: X'Trapolis Mega rolling stock
- Owner: Alstom (70%) uBumbano Rail (30%)
- Number of employees: 921 (2020)
- Website: www.gibela-rail.com

Gibela is a joint South African and French railway rolling stock manufacturer, based in Dunnottar, in the Gauteng province of South Africa.

Gibela produces the modern X'Trapolis Mega electric multiple unit (EMU). The train is currently built for South Africa's daily Metrorail commuter service that operates in major metropolitan areas across the country, as a vital part of the national transport system.

The company is jointly owned by Alstom, which has a 70% shareholding, and uBumbano Rail, which has a 30% stake. Gibela is a black economic empowerment consortium. In addition to building vehicles for South African operators, Gibela also plans to compete for other African rail contracts.

== History ==
Gibela was announced as the preferred bidder for a R51 billion contract to build 3,600 electric multiple units (EMUs) for the Passenger Rail Agency of South Africa (PRASA) in December 2012, which was finalized in October 2013.

Under the terms of the contract, Gibela would construct the units over a ten-year period, as well as provide parts and technical support after delivery. While the first twenty EMUs, dubbed the X'Trapolis Mega, were built by Alstom in Brazil, Gibela began construction of a new R1 billion assembly facility in Dunnottar, in the Gauteng province of South Africa in March 2016 to construct the remaining 580 trainsets.

In March 2022, Gibela reported that for the period January 2014 through March 2020, the company's work contributed 1.25% to Gauteng's economy. It also stated that for financial years 2019 through 2022, it had spent R34.46 million on local suppliers, which contributed to the local economy.

In July 2022, PRASA celebrated the delivery of the 100th trainset produced by Gibela, as part of the South African national rail modernization program. R124 billion has been budgeted for the renewal project, which will take place over a 20 year period. At the time of the announcement, the new Mega trains were active on transit routes in the City of Cape Town and City of Tshwane metropolitan municipalities.

In May 2025, it was reported that Gibela had produced 275 out of the commissioned 600 trainsets thus far.

In the same year, Gibela's incoming CEO, Thabiso Komako, stated that the company's contract with PRASA was not only creating a supply chain to support the local industry, but also resulting in some local companies exporting rail components. A number of South African suppliers were established solely because of the PRASA project. Aside from getting OEMs to set up factories in South Africa, the contract also encouraged local companies in the automotive and aerospace sectors to expand into rail. Some of these companies are now in the Alstom database, and supplying Alstom outside of the PRASA contract.

Komako further stated that the Mega trains currently in operation were traveling well below their designed speed of 120 kph; instead running at around 30 to 40 kph, due to railway signaling limitations that could be upgraded. Komako also confirmed Gibela's intention to seek the other half of the original PRASA contract. The original contract was for 1,200 trainsets, however only one half was initially awarded.

== Operations ==
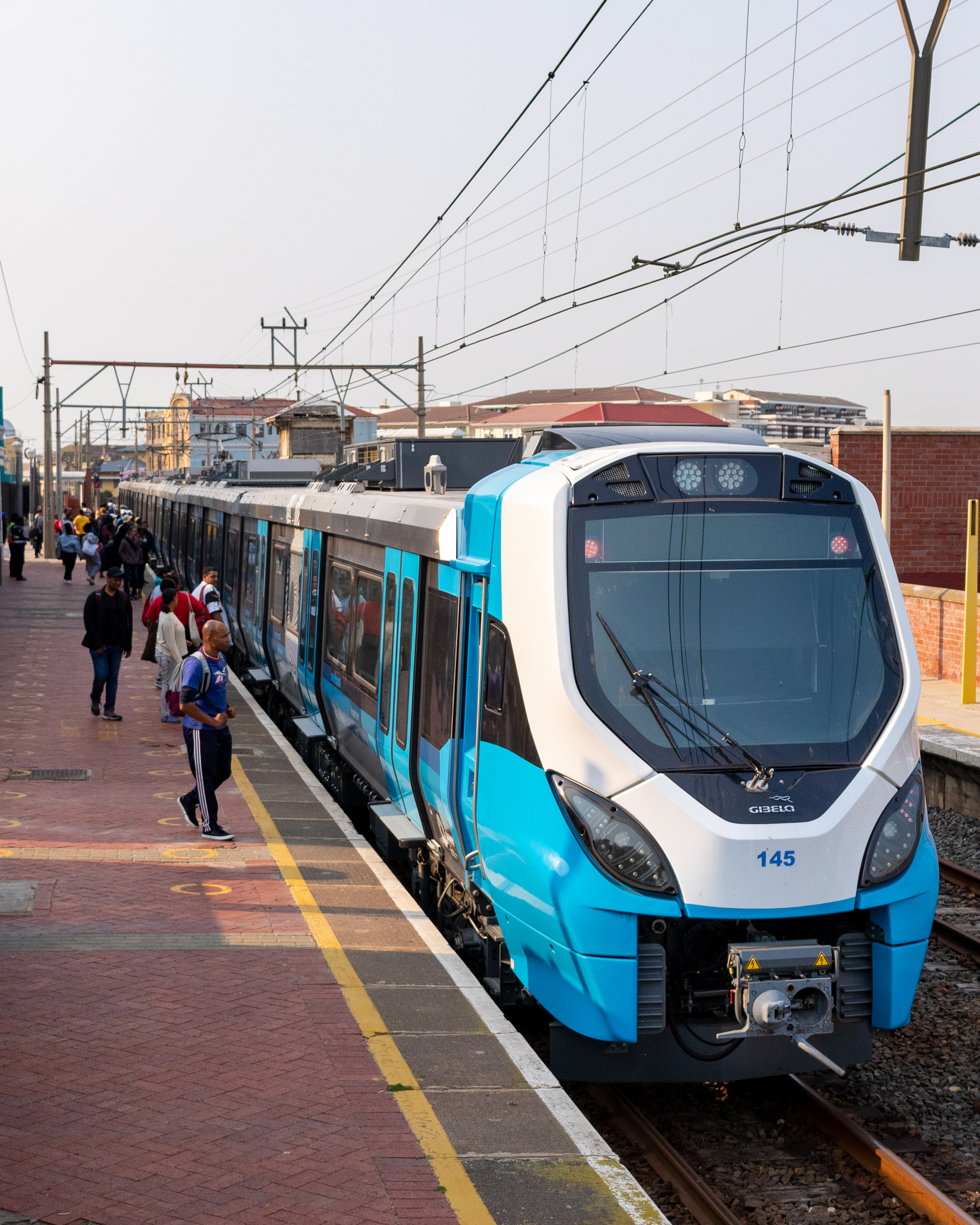
One of Gibela's X'Trapolis Mega trains at Muizenberg Station in Cape Town, on the Metrorail Western Cape Southern Line

The Gibela factory is the first train manufacturing plant on the African continent. It received a R1 billion investment from the South African Government, and sits on 78 hectares in the Gauteng province.

The factory uses 7-axis welding robots, which are a first of their kind in the global rail industry. It uses a LEAN manufacturing process, and 350 million rand's worth of specialized equipment, comprising 10,000 individual parts and 250 interlinked industrial activities. The factory's production rate of 2 cars per day (1.5 trains per week and 62 trains per year) is the fastest rail production rate for a factory in the entire world.

The Gibela factory is approximately 60,000 square metres (650,000 ft^{2}) in size, and employs around 1,500 people at full production. It features a 1.2 kilometer test track for testing acceleration, braking, and simulated passenger loads.

Gibela began occupying the facility in early January 2018, and its construction was scheduled to be completed in March of the same year.

The company sources from 85 South African suppliers, and as of 2020, 56% of its trains' value had been spent locally. In the same year, almost half (413) of the plant's 921 employees were black females, with 26% of senior management, 49% of middle management, and 49% of junior management being black women.

== Products ==
- X'Trapolis Mega: a 6-carriage, 1,200 passenger modular, electric train, with a 1.067 meter gauge and a maximum speed of 120 kph. To support Gibela sustainability efforts, the train uses components that are 90% recyclable, and energy-saving features like a structure built from lightweight stainless steel sourced in South Africa. The trains feature spacious interiors, large windows, air conditioning, and CCTV security cameras, and WiFi access.

== Corporate social responsibility ==
In 2022, Gibela launched a sponsored training program for unemployed South Africans in KwaThema, Tsakane, Duduza, and other areas in Ekurhuleni, Gauteng. Training in 13 different skill sets was offered, across business and technical curricula. Gibela stated that the goal of the program was to address unemployment by equipping people within the communities surrounding its factory with skills that will enable them to develop their own businesses.

As part of a commitment to skills acquisition and transfer, Gibela runs a 3-year apprenticeship program, which has taken on around 300 apprentices to train them as skilled artisans. Furthermore, Gibela runs a community skills development programme that trains an average of 650 people a year. Participants can gain technical and non-technical skills across 6 different programs.

The company also runs a bursary program for university, university of technology, and technical and vocational college (TVET) students, as well as an internship program. Since inception, the program has funded over 1,100 students. In September 2020, Gibela had spent a cumulative R69 million on bursaries.
