= Lucky Montana =

South African businessman

Tshepo Lucky Montana

Member of the National Assembly of South Africa Parliament for KwaZulu-Natal
- In office 28 August 2024 – 1 December 2025

Group CEO of PRASA
- In office October 2010 – July 2015
- Preceded by: Position established
- Succeeded by: Nathi Khena

Personal details
- Born: April 25, 1970 (age 56) Mamelodi, Pretoria
- Party: uMkhonto weSizwe Party
- Children: 2
- Education: University of Cape Town (BA, Hons)

Tshepo Lucky Montana (born 25 April 1970) is a South African public administrator and former politician. He served as the chief executive officer of the Passenger Rail Agency of South Africa (PRASA) from 2010 to 2015. In the 2024 South African general election, he was elected to the National Assembly as a member of the UMkhonto we Sizwe (MK) Party, up until his resignation from Parliament in December 2025.

== Career ==
=== Early public transport positions ===
Montana entered the public transport sector in the 1990s. In 2005, he was appointed to the board of the South African Rail Commuter Corporation, PRASA's predecessor, later becoming its chief executive officer. According to the Mail & Guardian, he also served for a period as a political adviser to Jeff Radebe during Radebe's tenure as Minister of Public Enterprises.

=== PRASA ===
Montana was appointed group CEO of PRASA in October 2010. Later that year, media reports identified him as a front-runner for the Transnet CEO position, although he remained at PRASA. In April 2015, PRASA announced that Montana had informed the board he would not seek a new term when his contract expired in March 2016. He was dismissed in July 2015 before the end of his contract.

Montana's tenure at PRASA was marked by significant controversy. In June 2022, the Judicial Commission of Inquiry into Allegations of State Capture (the Zondo Commission) recommended that law-enforcement authorities expedite investigations into alleged criminal misconduct involving Montana's time at PRASA. The commission also recommended that the National Prosecuting Authority consider potential prosecution and called for a dedicated inquiry into PRASA's decline during and after his leadership.

Commission chairperson Raymond Zondo wrote

Many, many days of the Commission's hearings were devoted to the allegations of the capture of PRASA and strident denials thereof, especially by Mr Montana. However, I am left with the uneasy perception that there is much about the ills of PRASA that has not yet been uncovered.

=== Member of Parliament ===
Montana was elected to the National Assembly in 2024 as an MK Party representative via the national list. He resigned from his seat in December 2025.

== SARS allegations ==
In 2025, South African Revenue Service (SARS) said it had audited Montana's tax affairs for the 2009–2019 tax years after he failed to submit his returns for 2017, 2018 and 2019. The audit found out that Montana under-declared income from various sources and evaded tax liability according to SARS. Additional assessments issued by SARS reportedly amounted to roughly R 15.5 million, only counting capital, but with interest, penalties and other adjustments the total purported tax debt grew to over R 55 million. SARS described the debt as overdue and subsequently filed civil judgments and a certified statement in the High Court between 2019 and 2022; after years of non-compliance, it launched a sequestration application against Montana in May 2023.

In response, Montana publicly accused SARS of "fraudulently doctoring a fake court judgment" to justify the tax bill, and alleged the tax-imposition process was part of a politically motivated "witch hunt". According to media reports, he claimed there was no existing court judgment authorising the amount, and reportedly laid criminal charges against senior SARS officials for fraud and abuse of power. He denied owing SARS any money, stating "I do not owe SARS a cent."

SARS responded in August–October 2025. The institution issued a statement labelling Montana's allegations "false, scandalous and vexatious", and warned that it would invoke the disclosure power under section 67(5) of the Tax Administration Act if he did not retract his claims within 24 hours. SARS maintained that its audit process, assessments, civil judgments and sequestration application were legally valid, and that Montana had under-declared income and remained liable for unpaid tax. By 17 October 2025, the High Court dismissed Montana's condonation application, for late filing of his responding affidavit, and struck out his replying affidavit in the sequestration proceedings, effectively upholding SARS' case. SARS also noted that a "compromise offer" made by Montana in August 2025, offering about R 5.4 million toward the alleged R 55 million, which contradicted his public denials of owing any money.
