= Metrorail (South Africa) =

South African commuter rail service operator

- Official logo

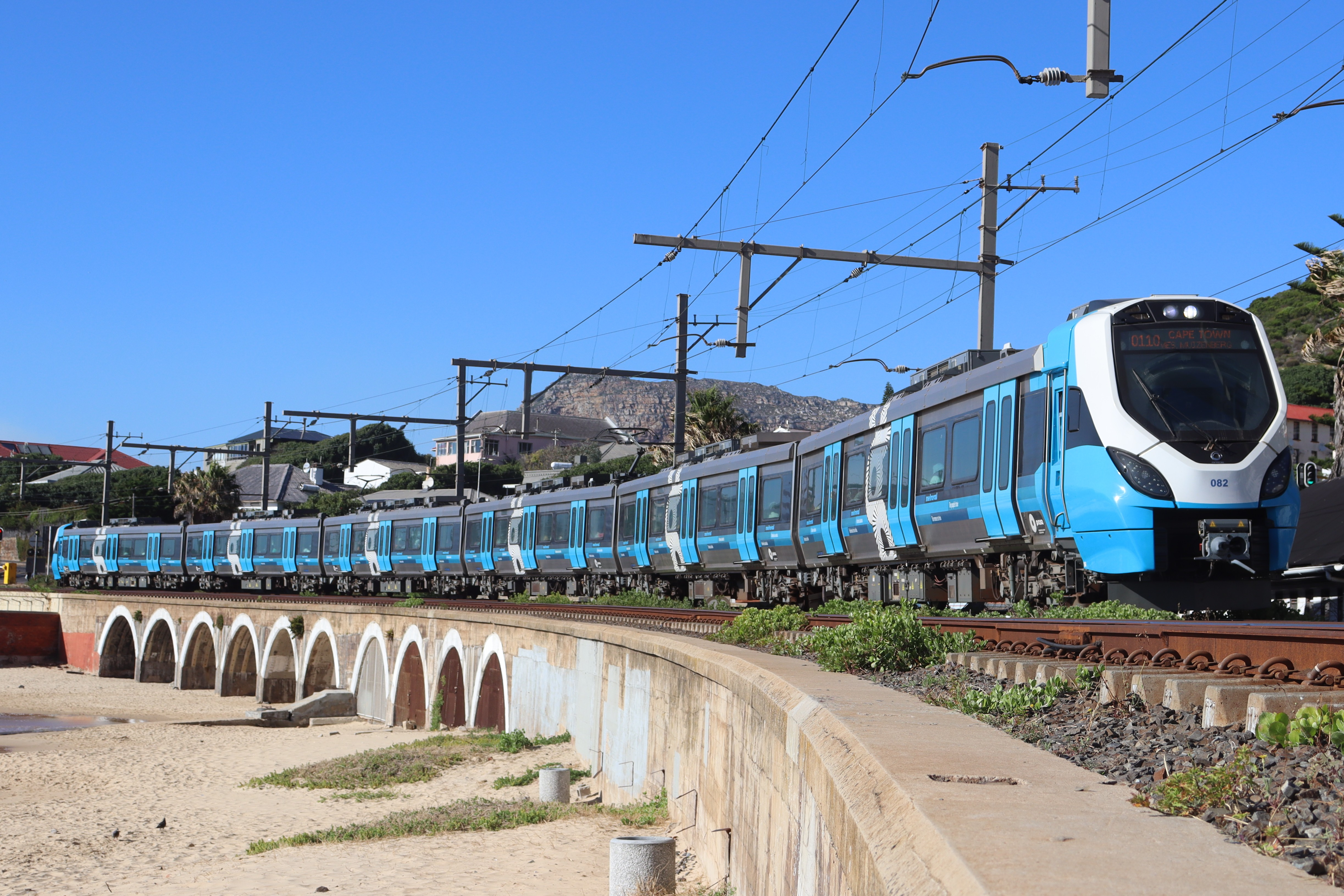
- A Metrorail X'Trapolis Mega train, with the service's current livery, headed to Kalk Bay, in Cape Town

Overview
- Owner: PRASA
- Area served: South African metro areas
- Transit type: Commuter rail Passenger rail
- Annual ridership: 77 million (2025)
- Chief executive: Nosizwe Nokwe-Macamo (PRASA Chairwoman); Hishaam Emeran (PRASA CEO)
- Headquarters: Johannesburg, South Africa
- Website: prasa.com/divisions/metrorail

Operation
- Operator: PRASA
- Rolling stock: X'Trapolis Mega, produced locally by Gibela

Technical
- Track gauge: 1,067 mm (3 ft 6 in)
- Electrification: 3 kV DC overhead catenary
- Top speed: 90 kph

Metrorail is the South African operator of commuter rail services. The company operates an extensive network in the major metros of South Africa. It is a division of the Passenger Rail Agency of South Africa (PRASA), a state-owned enterprise responsible for most passenger rail services in South Africa.

The Metrorail network consists of 471 stations and 2,228 kilometres (1,384 mi) of track. In 2025, across its four regional hubs, Metrorail had a total ridership of 77 million passengers.

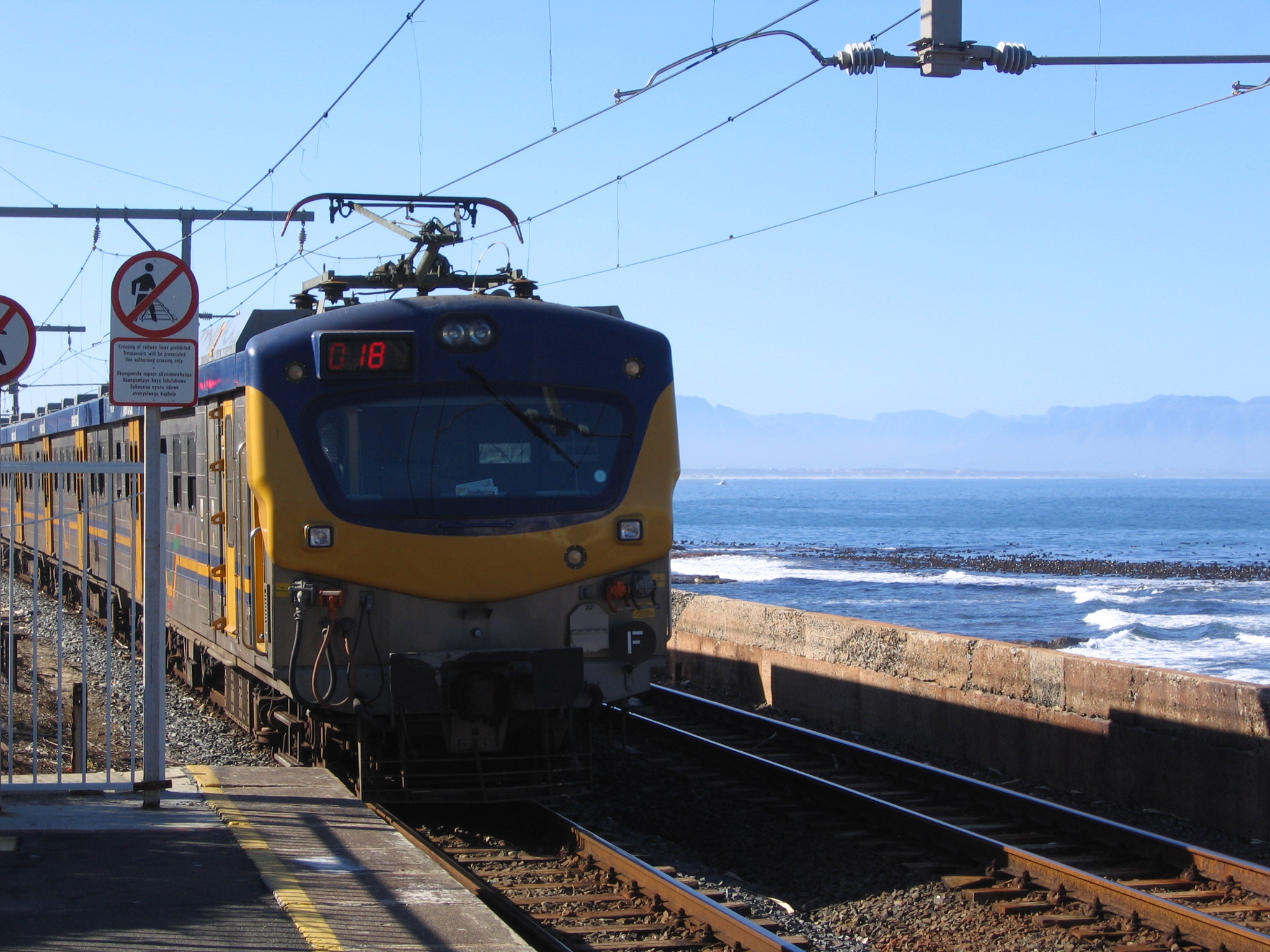
A Metrorail 10M3 train, featuring the service's old livery, pulling out of Kalk Bay station

== History ==
Metrorail was formed in 1996 as a business unit of Transnet, a major South African state-owned enterprise operating in the rail, port, pipeline, and logistics sectors.

In the early-1990s, Metrorail was placed under Spoornet, another business unit of Transnet. On 1 January 1997, Metrorail became an independent business within Transnet, and the four present-day Metrorail regional hubs were formed.

In 2006, Metrorail was transferred back into the SARCC, which in 2008, became the Passenger Rail Agency of South Africa (PRASA).

In October 2025, after years of low ridership, PRASA reported that Metrorail had achieved an annual ridership for its 2025 financial year of 77 million passengers. This constituted a significant 670% improvement over the preceding five years. PRASA also reported a 91% on-time performance, with service cancellations at just 3%. At the time of the announcement, 35 of Metrorail's 40 lines were in operation (87.5%), and 28 of them (70%) were fully operational. PRASA celebrated restoring passenger confidence in the Metrorail system, with its CEO, Hishaam Emeran, stating that the company had exceeded its promises, and built the foundation for a modern, reliable railway system that its commuters deserved.

== Operations ==
Because Metrorail operates services in several separate cities, for operational purposes it is subdivided into four regions.

Eastern Cape region (Gqeberha hub)

This region operates two separate lines in the Eastern Cape: one running from East London to Berlin, and one from Gqeberha to Uitenhage. Plans are in the pipeline to connect the service to Coega.

Gauteng (Johannesburg hub)

Previously there were two regions: Witwatersrand in the south and Tshwane in the north. The southern area covers the Greater Johannesburg Metropolitan Area (also known as the Witwatersrand). Trains run from Johannesburg and Germiston outwards to Springs, Pretoria, Soweto and Randfontein via Krugersdorp.

The northern part covers Pretoria and surrounding suburbs. Trains run from Pretoria station outwards to the various suburbs of the city, as well as southwards to Johannesburg via Kempton Park and Germiston stations (in the Witwatersrand region).

KwaZulu-Natal region (Durban hub)

This region covers Durban and the surrounding suburbs and towns. Trains run from Durban station outwards as far as Stanger on the north coast, Kelso on the south coast, and Cato Ridge inland.

Western Cape region (Cape Town hub)

This region covers the Cape Town metropolitan area and surrounding towns. Trains run from Cape Town railway station southwards to Simon's Town, southeast to Mitchell's Plain and Khayelitsha, and eastwards through Bellville to Strand, Stellenbosch and Wellington; occasional services run to Malmesbury and Worcester.

Metrorail regional network maps
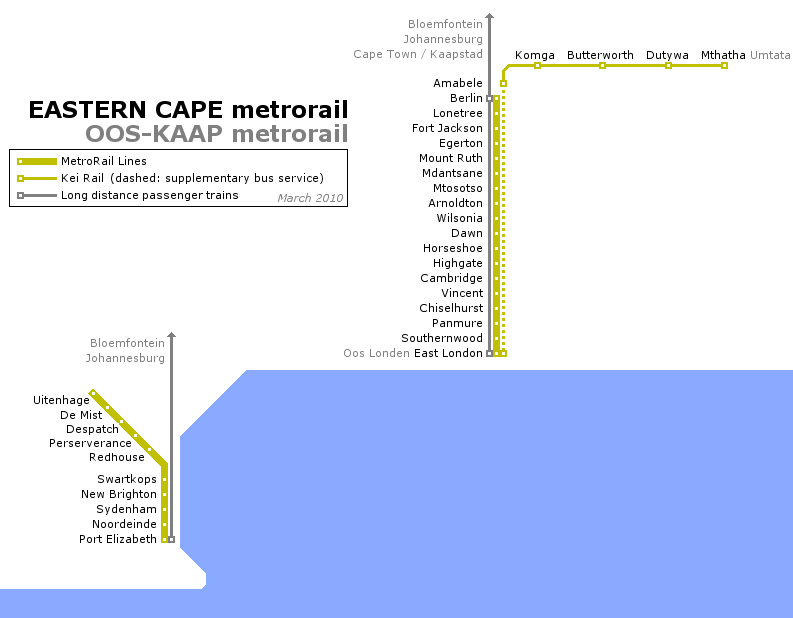
Eastern Cape region (Gqeberha hub)

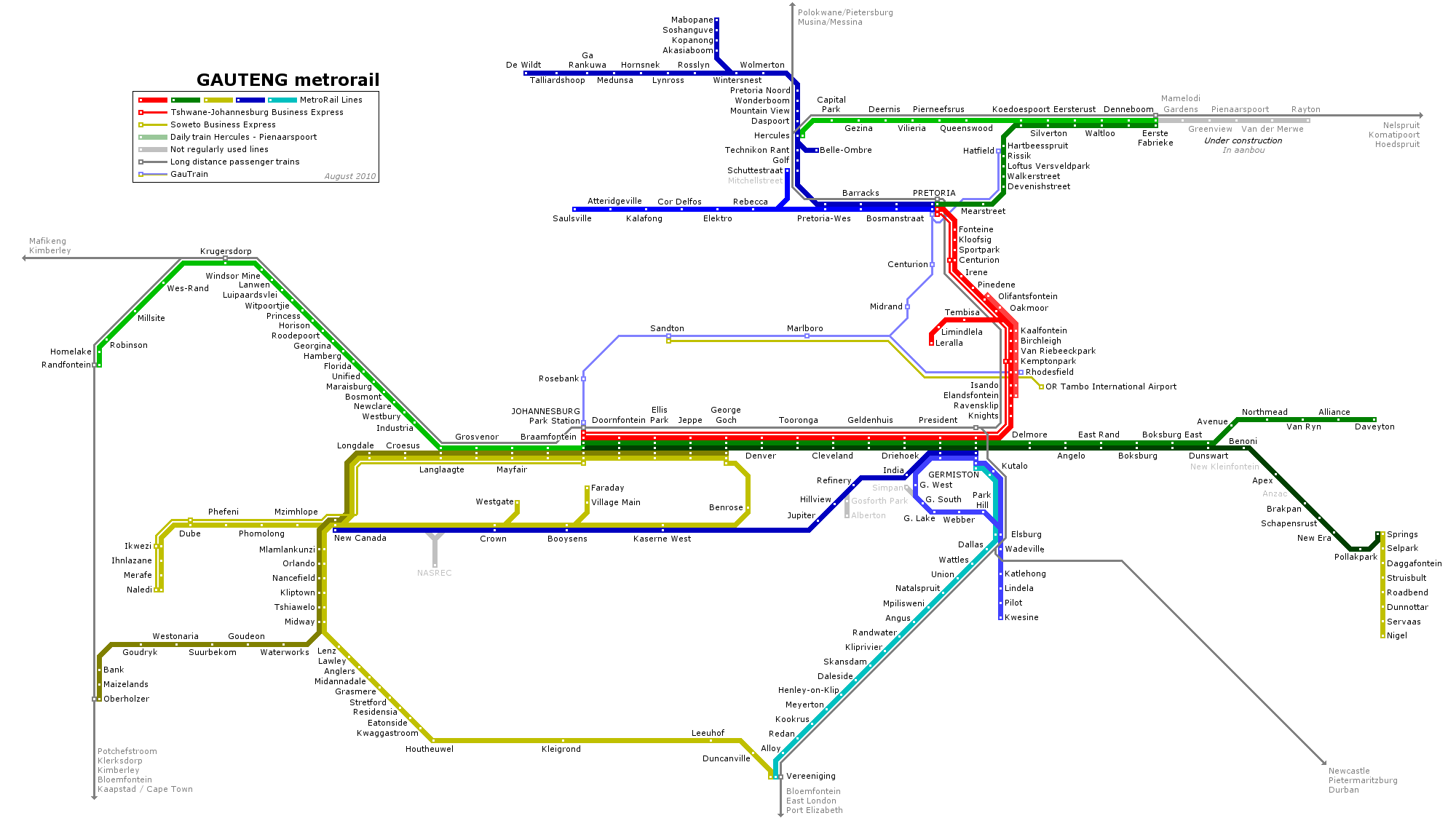
Gauteng (Johannesburg hub)

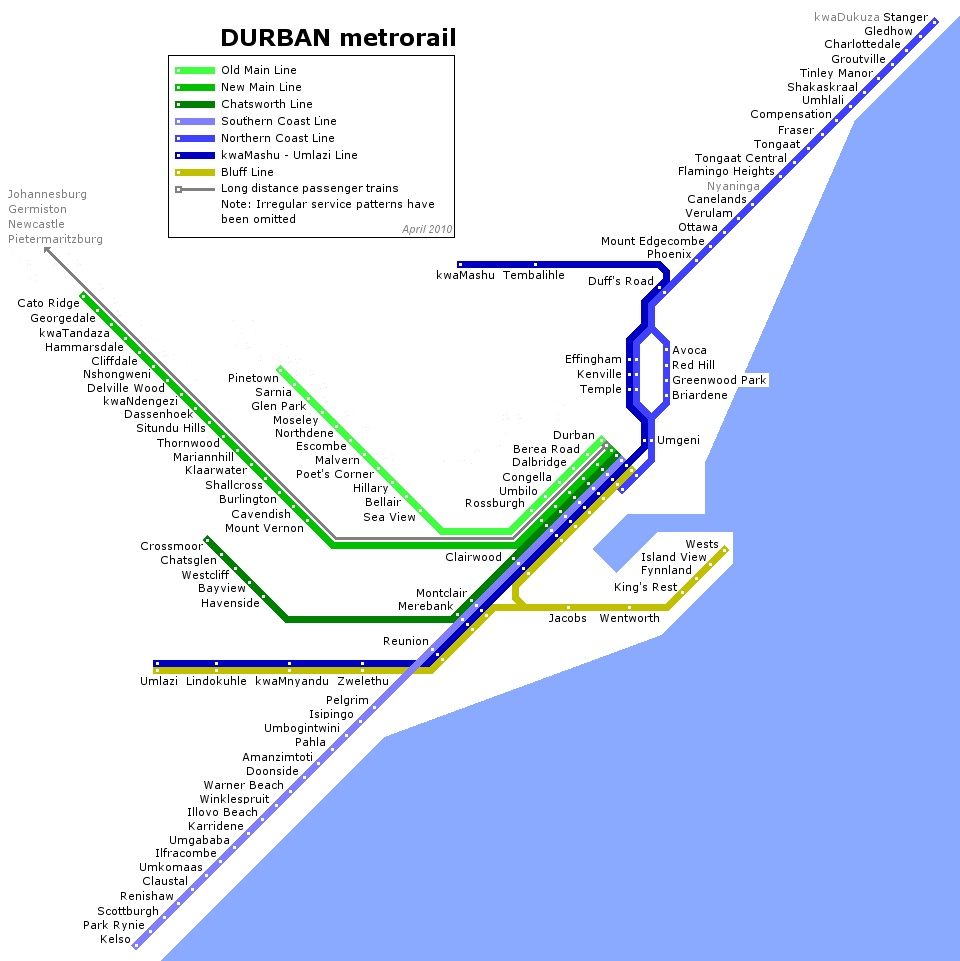
KwaZulu-Natal region (Durban hub)

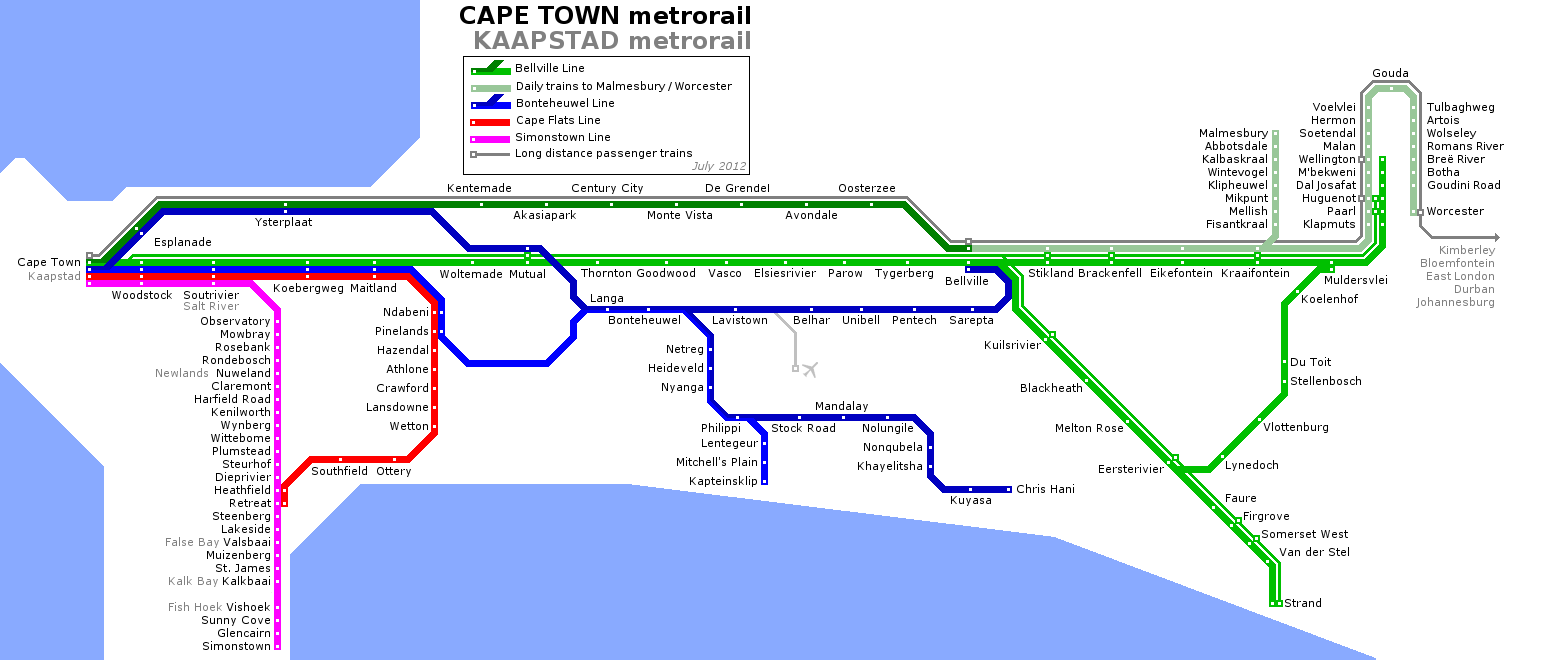
Western Cape region (Cape Town hub)

== Track and equipment ==
Metrorail trains, as with the rest of the South African rail network, run on 1,067 mm (3 ft 6 in) track. Some routes run on track owned and operated by PRASA; other routes run on track operated by Transnet and also used for long-distance and freight trains.

Most Metrorail services are operated by electric multiple unit train sets of the domestically built 5M2A type and the Japanese-built 8M type. Since 1999, the 5M2A trains are being refurbished. Everything above the underframe is completely removed, and replaced by new, prefabricated wall and roof modules. In 2007 alone more than 300 coaches were refurbished. The new trains are designated 10M3 (Cape Town), 10M4 (Gauteng) or 10M5 (Durban).

The Metrorail services on the Eastern Cape are operated by four diesel trains, each consisting of ten coaches and a diesel locomotive.

280 train sets operate on the system, each able to carry up to 1,800 passengers.

In October 2013, Gibela was awarded a contract to build 600 X'Trapolis Mega EMU trainsets (3,600 cars), the first half of a multi-phase rolling stock renewal program that would see up to 1,200 new trainsets delivered by the 2030s.

== Safety ==
In the 2000s and 2010s, much concern was expressed about the safety of passengers on Metrorail trains, both due to crime and accidents. Serious incidents include murders and assaults on-board trains, several level crossing accidents, and a crash in Soweto.

An organisation called the Rail Commuters Action Group instituted a lawsuit against Metrorail and the South African Government to force them to invest more money in security. The case reached the Constitutional Court, which declared that Metrorail has "an obligation to ensure that reasonable measures are taken to provide for the security of rail commuters". Despite this, safety on the trains remained a dire concern.

Metrorail services also suffered from instances of arson of train-sets which occurred during passenger protests but not necessarily by disgruntled passengers, in some cases forcing the closure of lines; as well as incidents of cable theft disrupting services.

In 2006, the Faure level crossing accident killed 19 people in a truck which had stalled on a level crossing.

=== Improvement ===
Investment in the 2020s saw improvements to safety and service quality across the network, attracting travellers to rail, including some of the many who had stopped relying on trains due to substandard service and safety concerns.

== See also ==
- Gautrain
- Johannesburg-Durban High Speed Rail
