= South African Class 5M2 =

Class of EMU operated in South Africa

South African Railways Class 5M2
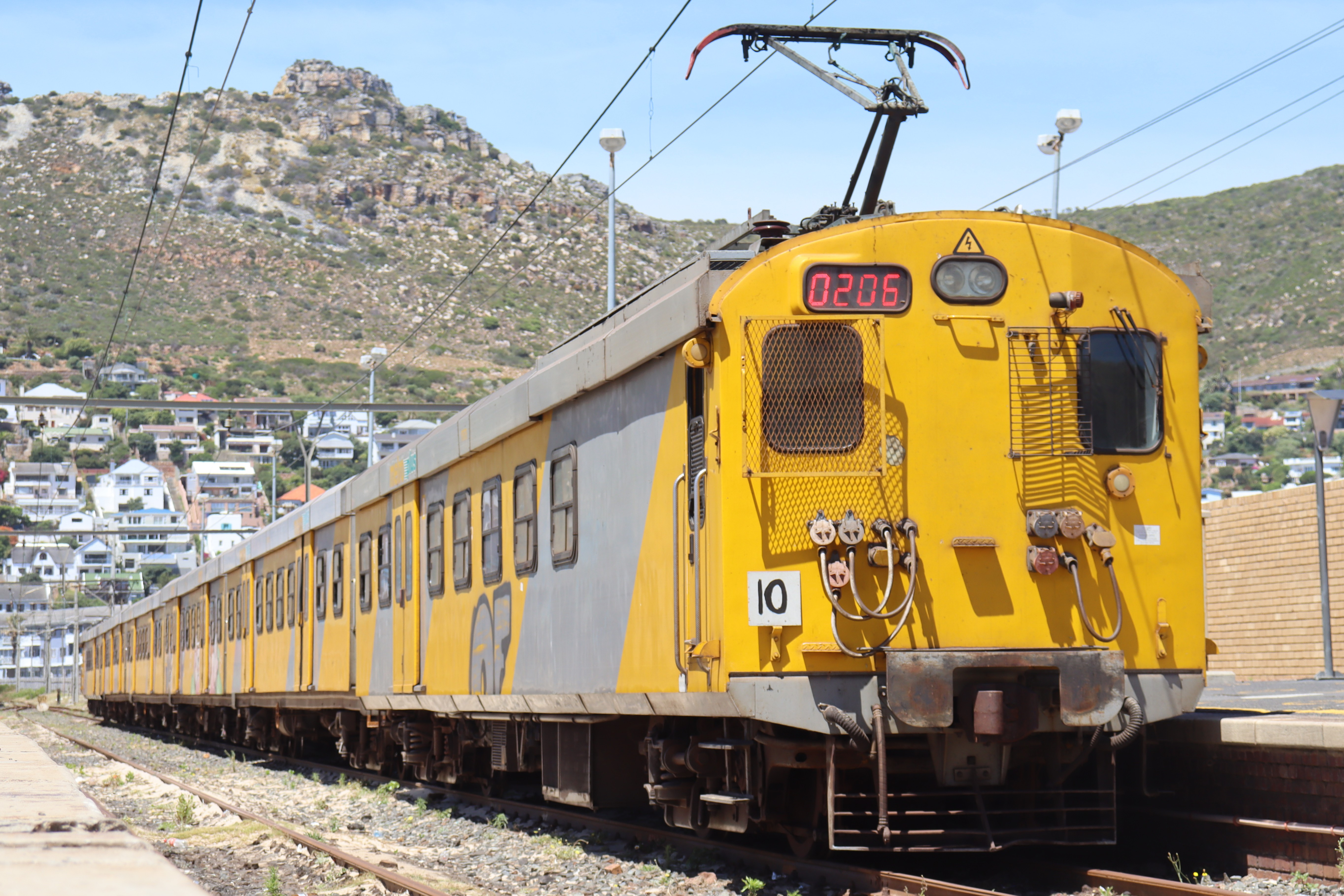
- Metrorail Western Cape class 5M2A trainset on the Southern Line at Fish Hoek.
- In service: 1958–present
- Manufacturer: Metro-Cammell (5M2); Union Carriage & Wagon (5M2A)
- Constructed: 1958–1960 (Metro Cammell); 1962–1985 (UCW)
- Number built: 4,447 coaches (5M2A)
- Formation: 4–14 cars per trainset
- Capacity: Motor: 110 standing, 56 seated; Trailer: 149 standing, 52 seated
- Operators: Metrorail

Specifications
- Maximum speed: 100 km/h (62 mph)
- Weight: Motor: 60 tonnes (59 long tons; 66 short tons); Trailer: 30.5 tonnes (30.0 long tons; 33.6 short tons)
- Power output: 925 kW (1,240 hp) per motor coach
- Electric system(s): 3000 V DC Catenary
- Current collection: Pantograph
- Track gauge: 3 ft 6 in (1,067 mm) Cape gauge

The Class 5M2 and Class 5M2A are electric multiple units that provide commuter rail services operated by Metrorail in the major cities of South Africa. The original Class 5M2 trainsets were built for the South African Railways by Metro-Cammell between 1958 and 1960. Most of those in use today, however, are of Class 5M2A, built to the same design by Union Carriage & Wagon (UCW) from 1962 to 1985; a total of 4,447 coaches were built by UCW.

A programme began in the 2000s to rebuild the trains, which were subsequently designated Class 10M3, 10M4 and 10M5. Class 5M2A coaches were stripped down to the underframe, which was then used as the base for the Class 10Ms.

== Specifications ==
The Class 5M2s operate on the 3 ft 6 in (1,067 mm) Cape gauge track that is standard throughout Southern Africa. The motor coaches draw 3,000 volt direct current from an overhead pantograph; they have a power output of 925 kilowatts (1,240 hp) and produce 158 kN (15.9 LTf; 17.8 STf) of tractive effort. The maximum speed of a 5M2 trainset is 100 kilometres per hour (62 mph). A motor coach can carry 56 seated and 110 standing passengers, and has a tare weight of 60 tonnes. A trailer coach can carry 52 seated and 149 standing passengers, and has a tare weight of 30.5 tonnes (30.0 long tons; 33.6 short tons).

== Gallery ==
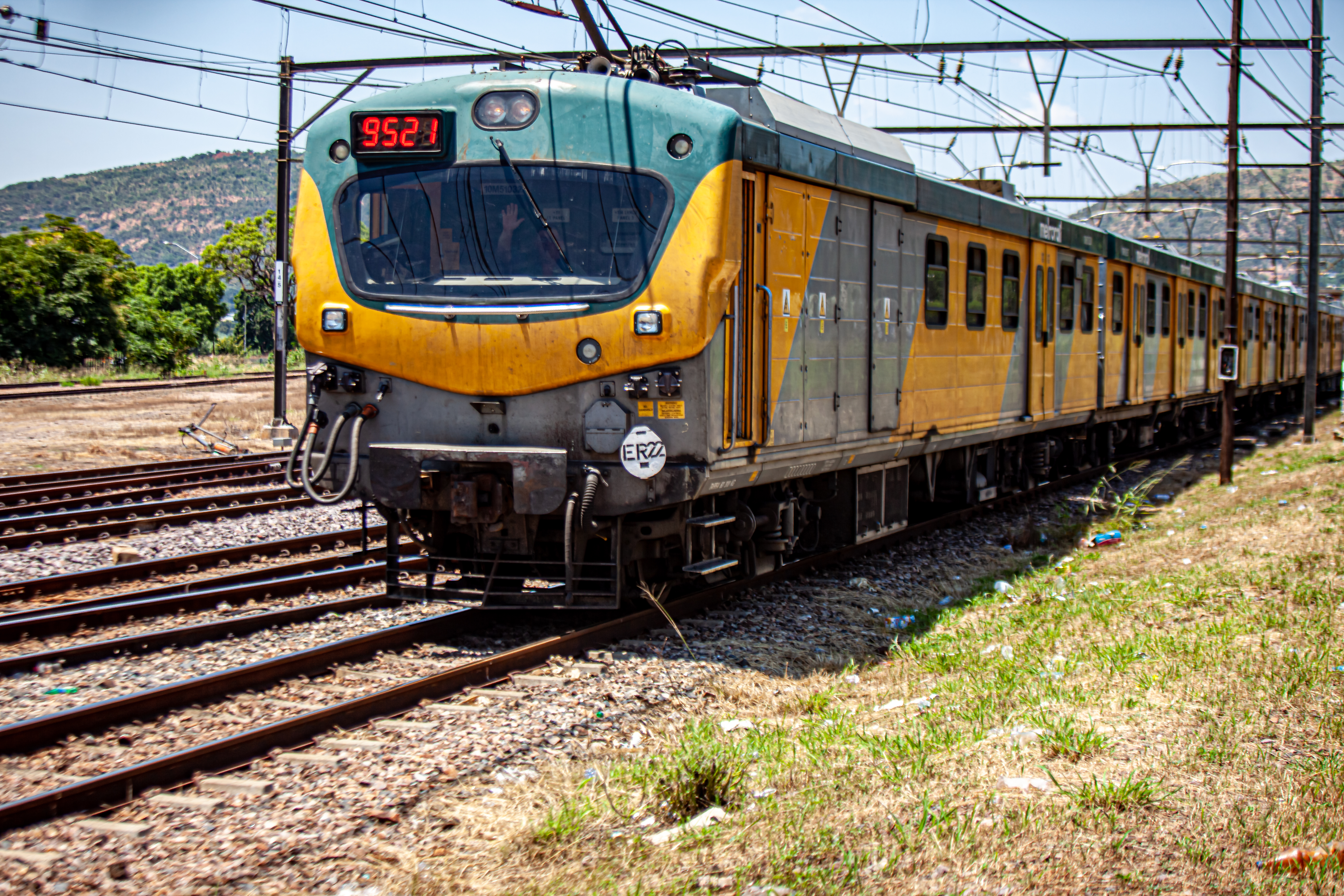
A rebuilt Class 10M train

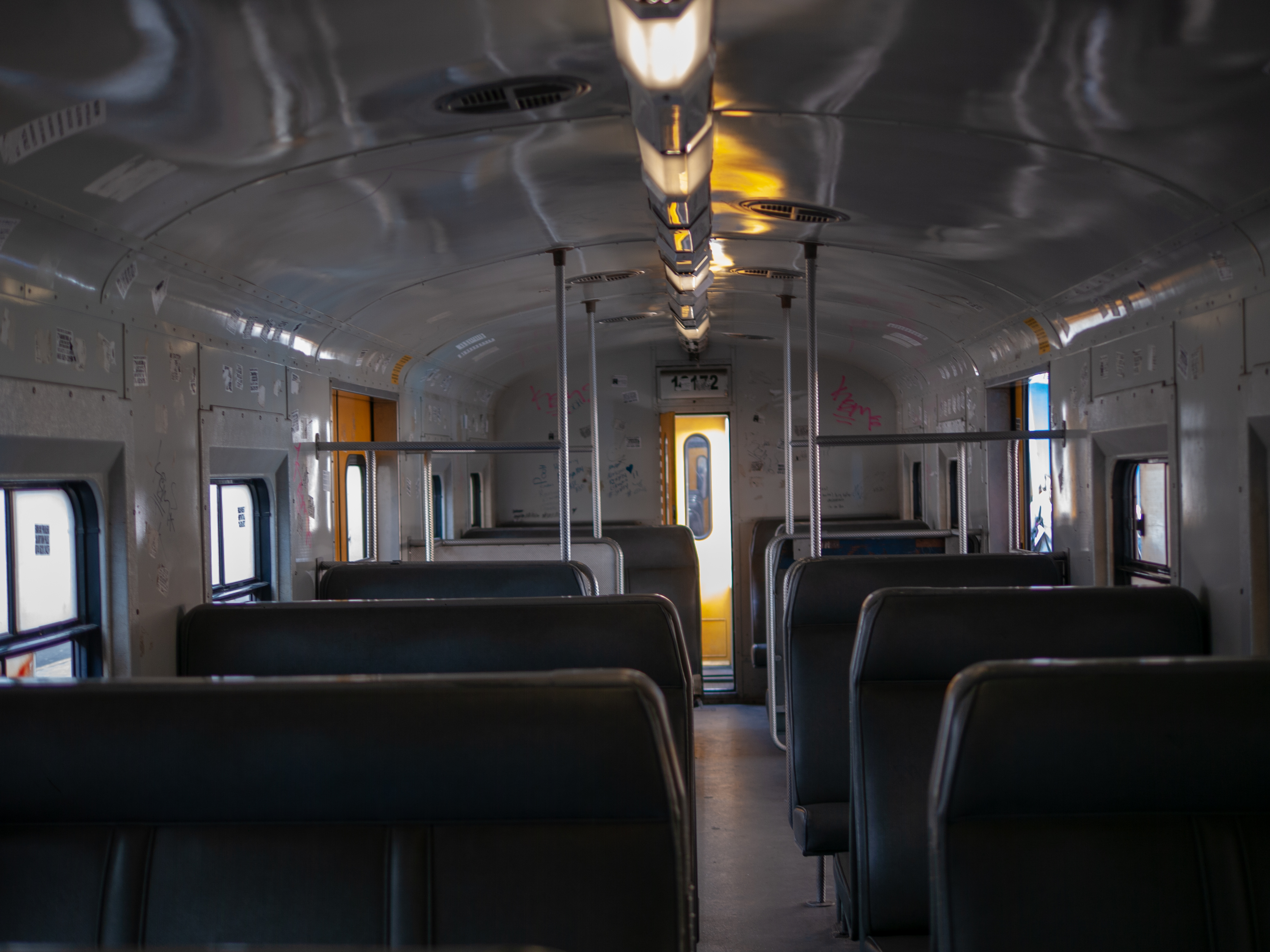
5M2 interior

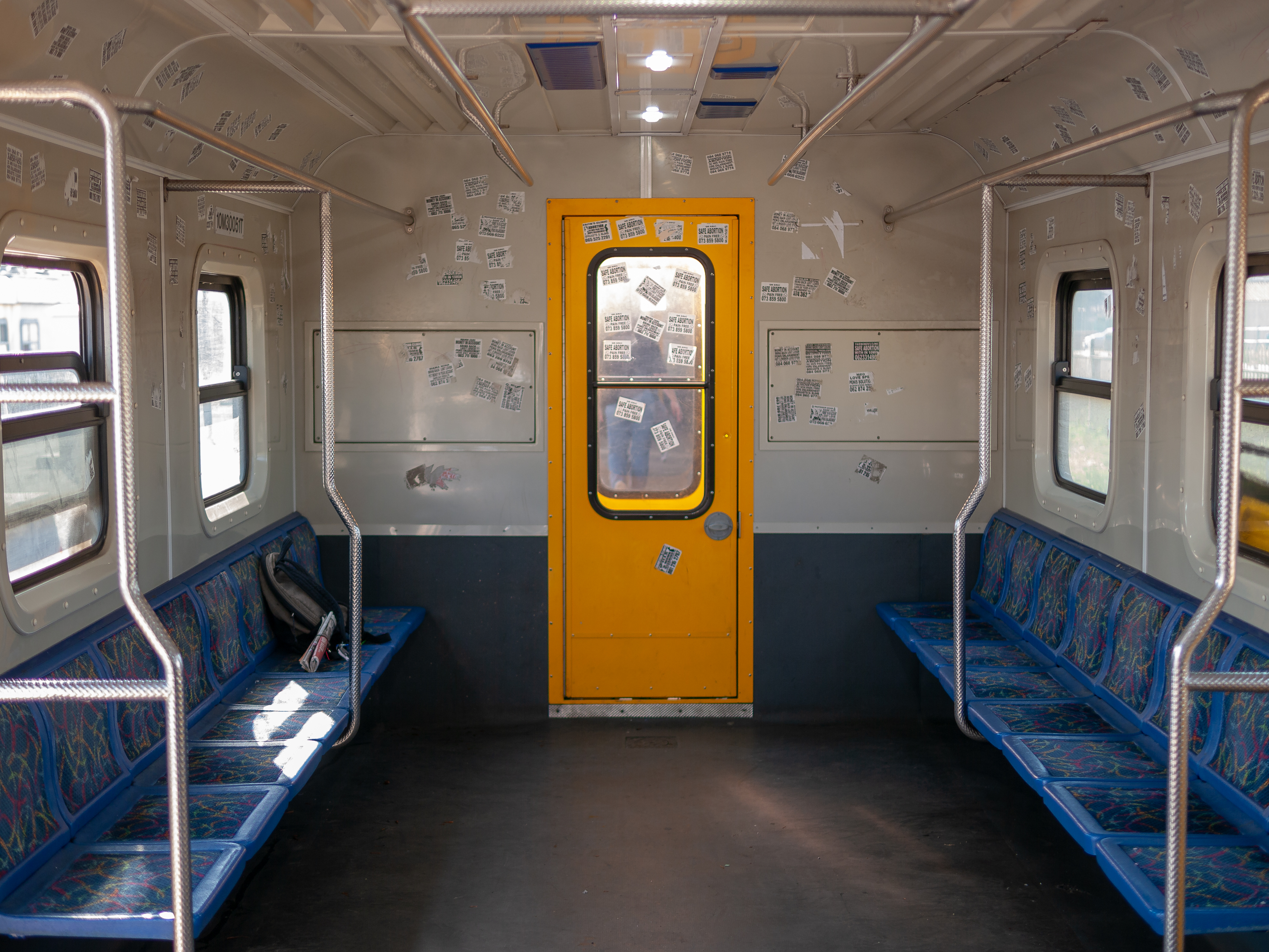
Interior of a Metro Plus (1st class) car
