= Passenger Rail Agency of South Africa =

State-owned enterprise founded in 1990

- Type: State owned enterprise
- Industry: Passenger rail
- Founded: 1990; 36 years ago
- Headquarters: Johannesburg, South Africa
- Area served: South Africa
- Key people: Hishaam Emeran (Group CEO)
- Services: Transport management
- Revenue: ▲ R24.03 billion (2024)
- Net income: ▲ R10.28 billion (2024)
- Total assets: ▲ R90.31 billion (2024)
- Number of employees: 17,000 (2020)
- Parent: Government of South Africa
- Divisions: Metrorail; Shosholoza Meyl; Autopax; PRASA Cres; PRASA Tech
- Website: www.prasa.com

The Passenger Rail Agency of South Africa (PRASA) is a South African state-owned enterprise responsible for most passenger rail services in the country. It reports to the Department of Transport, headed by the Minister of Transport.

PRASA's primary mandate includes providing commuter rail services within metros, and long-distance (inter-city) rail and bus services within, to, and from South Africa’s borders.

== History ==
In 1910, as a consequence of the formation of the Union of South Africa, all railway services in South Africa were merged into the South African Railways & Harbours. The reclassification and renumbering of the rolling stock of the three constituent railways was implemented on 1 January 1912. The South African Railways & Harbours was later renamed the South African Transport Services.

On 1 April 1990, Transnet was created to take over most of the operations of the SATS, with the exception of commuter rail which was transferred to the newly formed South African Rail Commuter Corporation (SARCC).

The SARCC owned commuter rail-related assets, including stations and surrounding land, infrastructure and rolling stock, while the services were operated by Metrorail. Initially, Metrorail was an operating unit of Spoornet, Transnet's rail subsidiary; in 1996 it became a separate business unit of Transnet. Long-distance passenger rail services, meanwhile, were operated by Spoornet (now Transnet Freight Rail) under the name Shosholoza Meyl.

On 1 December 2004, the South African Cabinet decided to integrate the current state-run passenger rail and bus services under one organisation which at that time was managed by the SARCC and Transnet, so as to improve the accessibility, safety and cost to the consumer. The government observed that the separation of ownership between SARCC and Transnet caused problems, in particular with disputes over the responsibility for maintenance and investment.

In 2006, ownership of Metrorail was transferred to the SARCC, unifying the responsibility for commuter rail.

On 23 December 2008, the SARCC was renamed the Passenger Rail Agency of South Africa, and in subsequent months other assets were transferred to PRASA. The organization in its current form was established under Section 22 of the Legal Succession to the South African Transport Services Act of 2008 (as amended).

PRASA was officially launched in March 2009 and combined the assets of Metrorail, Shosholoza Meyl, Autopax and Intersite Property Management Services under this new organisation.

In April 2011, PRASA announced a huge plan to replace rolling stock, worth R97bn; 6600 new vehicles would be ordered.

=== Difficulties ===
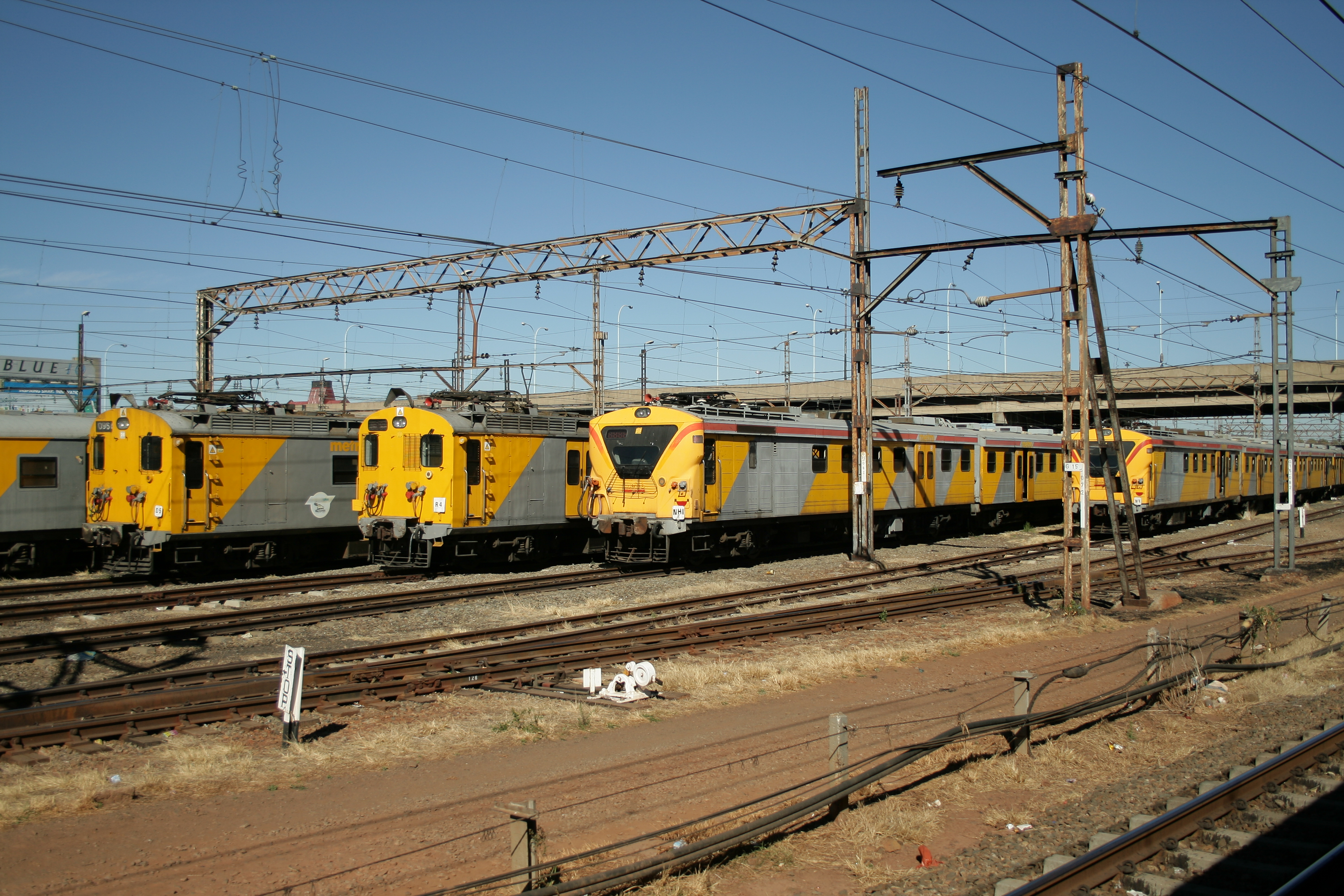
Metrorail trains in Johannesburg in 2011

Between 2011 and 2021 PRASA experienced a significant fall in its ability to fulfil its mandate to provide rail based public transportation in South Africa's urban areas. Statistics SA found that about 80% of regular PRASA commuters had stopped using the company's network of municipal railway services between 2013 and 2021.

High levels of corruption, maladministration and mismanagement, largely associated with the presidency of Jacob Zuma, were blamed for the fall in the state owned enterprise's ability to provide basic rail passenger transport services. These issues were investigated by the Public Protector of South Africa.

PRASA has also been criticised for being very slow to pay its suppliers.

PRASA mismanagement led to the loss of R2.65 billion, through the acquisition of Spanish Afro 4000 trains which were unsuitable for South African rails. The Afro 4000 requires 4.14 meters of clearance, too high for SA rail infrastructure at 3.965 m.

The resulting scandal led to the 2015 removal of CEO, Lucky Montana and his chief engineer "Dr." Daniel Mtimkulu. Subsequent investigation revealed that Daniel Mtimkulu had falsified his qualifications. Having claimed to possess an electrical engineering doctorate, he was exposed as merely a technologist without even having completed a 4-year engineering B.S.

During December 2016, acting PRASA CEO Collins Letsoalo told the Parliamentary Standing Committee on Public Accounts that the organisation had incurred R13.9 billion in irregular expenditure while 142 contracts worth R24 billion were being investigated for corruption with some cases referred to the Hawks.

In mid-August 2019, Transport Minister Fikile Mbalula launched a war room with a 100 day plan to improve PRASA's railway network and to plot its progress. Director-General Alec Moemi was placed in charge of the unit and daily status meetings were to be held with performance managed and monitored daily. Progress would have to be made by 31 December 2019. Targets included improving arrival times of Metrorail from 50.2% to 85% and increasing the amount of train sets available; improving arrival times of the Shosholoza Meyl from 3% to 50% and the amount of available locomotives, among others.

Early December 2019 saw Transport Minister Fikile Mbalula fire the PRASA board and its chief executive officer and placed the organisation under administration after failing government audits and their inability to stabilise its financial position and market share. He announced the appointment of Bongisizwe Mpondo, managing director and founder of the transport company Safiri as the new administrator.

Administrator Mpondo announced in January 2020 that he had closed down the war room created by the minister five months earlier, and he formed five exco subcommittees called revenue enhancement and cost containment; governance; service recovery; safety management; and capital and modernisation programme acceleration.

He said the organisation would conduct lifestyle audits on 300 managers, especially those employees working in finance and supply-chains. Vacancies in critical senior management positions would be filled. Auditor-General findings and his concerns would also be investigated and attended too.

On 16 January 2020, the Railway Safety Regulator made a surprise inspection of PRASA's rolling stock maintenance facility in Braamfontein, Johannesburg. The inspection established that this large repair facility had not purchased brake blocks in six months despite needing 1,500 a month with the fleet of trains having been reduced to 32 from 144 over three years. Also missing were replacement train windows, lubricating oil and wheels. An improvement directive was issued and failure to comply would result in legal action.

In February 2020, Eskom cut power to PRASA's Western Cape rail network after they failed to pay R4 million overdue electricity account but was restored after payment. Also in February 2020, Tembinkosi Bonakele of the Competition Commission made recommendations for the unbundling of certain divisions of PRASA after an investigation into the public transport market in South Africa.

These proposed divisions are Autopax, PRASA Cres (its property manager) and Metrorail. All that would remain in PRASA's name would be Shosholoza Meyl and its technical division.

PRASA Cres manages the railway stations across the country and manages and charges access to these stations of Autopax other non-PRASA transport providers. Autopax is accused of not paying for parking spaces while enjoying exclusive locations while other providers were provided less exclusive spots. Both division were recommended to operate as separate state-owned enterprises (SOEs).

The Competition Commission also recommended that Metrorail in the Western Cape and Gauteng be managed and integrated into the provinces transport authorities services while the Eastern Cape and KwaZulu-Natal provincial authorities were not yet ready to manage their own services.

By 2022 Minister Mbalula announced that PRASA was no longer able to secure its trains and infrastructure as criminal syndicates had managed to infiltrate the company to facilitate wide scale metal theft.

Between January 2021 and July 2022, there were an average of 1.7-million rail passenger trips per month, which is just 4% of the monthly average over the ten years between 1999 and 2008, ridership having significantly declined from 2015 onwards. Post-COVID ridership is slowly recovering, with the agency reporting that by the end of March 2024 it had carried 40 million passengers during the previous year.

=== Recent developments ===
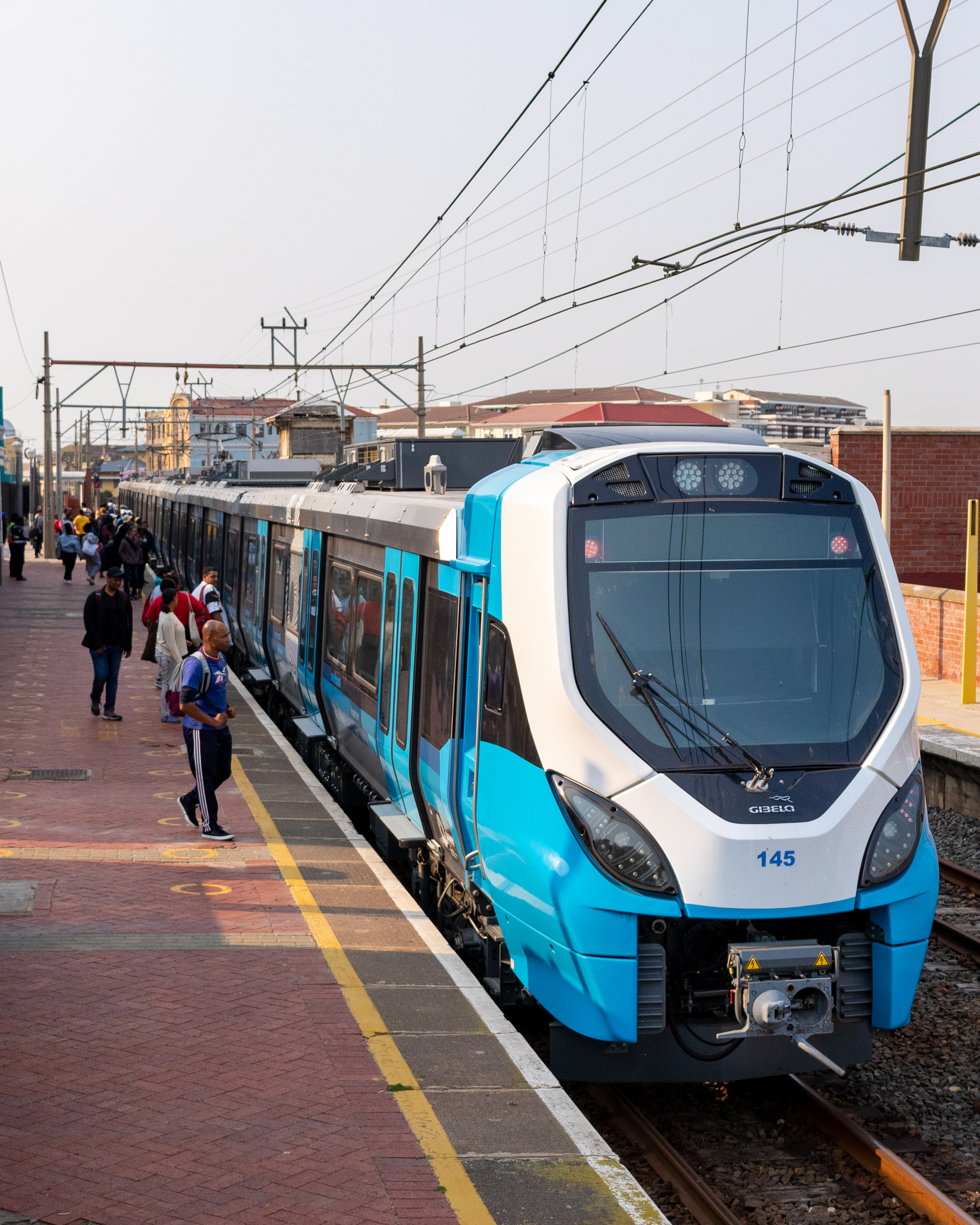
A X'Trapolis Mega trainset in Cape Town during 2023

In recent years, there have been major improvements in PRASA's operations. Its 2024 annual report noted that the company had gone from meeting 19% of its annual goals in 2022, to 59% in 2023, and then to 87% in 2024. A total of 39.44 million passenger trips were recorded in 2024 - double PRASA's target, and 152% more than the year prior.

In October 2025, Transport Minister Barbara Creecy announced that PRASA was seeking private sector investment to modernize and expand its network. This includes investing in building out regional rapid rail, with trains traveling at speeds of up to 300 kph. Funding would also be used for smart ticketing, upgrading train maintenance depos, and commercializing the PRASA's fiber optic network.

== Operations ==
PRASA consists of four branches: Metrorail, which operates commuter rail services in urban areas; Shosholoza Meyl, which operates regional and inter-city rail services; Autopax, which operates regional and inter-city coach services; and PRASA Cres, which manages the property owned by PRASA.

=== Network ===
PRASA operates 40 service lines, comprising thousands of kilometers of track, across four provinces: the Western Cape, Gauteng, the Eastern Cape, and KwaZulu-Natal.

== Ridership ==
PRASA ridership has increased significantly in recent years, as shown in the table below.

PRASA annual ridership figures
Year *	Ridership	Year-over-year Change
2021	10.01 million	-
2022	16.69 million	▲66.73%
2023	15.62 million	▼6.41
2024	39.44 million	▲152.49%
2025	76.72 million	▲94.52%

* Data is according to financial year ends.

== Corporate social responsibility ==
For a week in September 2025, as part of Heritage Month, PRASA Western Cape announced that it would provide special train services between Cape Town and Fish Hoek stations. From Fish Hoek, shuttles would take commuters to Cape Point, where entry to all SANParks sites are free for South African citizens as part of Heritage Day celebrations.

== Controversy ==
=== Swifambo-Vossloh contract and corruption probe ===
In 2012, Vossloh España and front-company Swifambo signed a R3.5 billion (2012) (equivalent to R4.81 billion or US$363.15 million in 2018) contract with the Passenger Rail Agency of South Africa (PRASA). Between 2011 and 2015, Vossloh made 10 payments amounting to R89 million, to set up the Swifambo-Vossloh deal with PRASA; the South African Reserve Bank flagged the payments as bribes.

In 2018, the Supreme Court of Appeal upheld a decision by the Johannesburg High Court declaring the contract corrupt. Vossloh has not paid back the R1.87 billion it received.

On the 30 August 2024, Attorney Jonty Cogger asked the Cape High Court to instruct the Passenger Rail Agency of South Africa (PRASA) to return the building material confiscated from thirty-eight people who had been living on land along Old Marine Drive on the Cape Town Foreshore.

== See also ==
- Gautrain
- Transnet Freight Rail
- Blue Train
- State-owned enterprises of South Africa
