= Ambassadors of Ukraine =

Ukrainian diplomatic position

Ambassadors of Ukraine are persons appointed by the president to serve as Ukraine's diplomatic representatives to foreign nations, international organizations, and as ambassadors-at-large.

Ambassadors are the highest-ranking diplomats of Ukraine and are usually based at the embassy in the host country. They are under the jurisdiction of the Ministry of Foreign Affairs (MFA) and answer directly to the Minister of Foreign Affairs; however, ambassadors serve "at the pleasure of the President", meaning they can be dismissed at any time. Appointments change regularly for various reasons, such as reassignment or retirement.

== Current ambassadors of Ukraine ==
Note that the information in this list is subject to change due to regular personnel changes resulting from dismissals, retirements, and reassignments.

Ukrainian ambassadors
Region (Note: Based on the regions used by the website of the Ukrainian Ministry of Foreign Affairs.)	Host country	Concurrent accreditation	Start of bilateral relations (Note: For the host country; this date is in most cases different from the host country's date of recognition of Ukraine's independence.)	Ambassador name (in Ukrainian) (Note: Ukrainian names link to the Ukrainian Wikipedia articles for each ambassador, if available.)	Title (Note: The full title for an ambassador is "Ambassador Extraordinary and Plenipotentiary of Ukraine" (Ukrainian: Надзвичайний і Повноважний посол України, romanized: Nadzvychainyi i Povnovazhnyi posol Ukrainy). This is shortened to simply "Ambassador" in the table.)	Start of term (Note: The start of the term of the current ambassador officeholder.)	Ref(s)
Africa	Algeria	Countries: Mali; Niger	20 August 1992 (Note: The Embassy of Ukraine to Algeria began operations in November 1999.)	Oleksandr Kompaniyets (Олександр Компанієць)	Chargé d'Affaires	2022	REF
Africa	Angola	—	30 September 1994 (Note: The Embassy of Ukraine to Angola was opened on 30 September 1994.)	Andrii Chornopytskyi (Андрій Чорнописький)	Chargé d'Affaires	2020	REF
Africa	Egypt	Countries: Eritrea; Sudan	25 January 1992	Mykola Nahornyi (Микола Нагорний)	Ambassador	9 March 2022	REF
Africa	Ethiopia	—	1 April 1993 (Note: The Embassy of Ukraine to Ethiopia started operations in June 2003.)	Oleksandr Zub (Олександр Зуб)	Chargé d'Affaires	1 May 2021	REF
Africa	Kenya	Countries: South Sudan; Tanzania; Burundi; Malawi; Rwanda; Somalia	5 May 1993	Andrii Pravednyk (Андрій Праведник)	Ambassador	21 September 2018	REF
Africa	Tunisia	Countries: Chad; Burkina Faso; Libya	17 March 1992	Volodymyr Khomanets (Володимир Хоманець)	Ambassador	22 September 2020	REF
Africa	Morocco	Countries: Mauritania	22 June 1992	Serhii Saienko (Сергій Саєнко)	Ambassador	14 December 2022	REF
Africa	Nigeria	Countries: Benin; Togo; Sierra Leone; Liberia; Democratic Republic of the Congo; Ghana?; The Gambia?	10 December 1992	Ivan Kholostenko (Іван Холостенко)	Ambassador	26 December 2022	REF
Africa	Senegal	Countries: Guinea; Guinea-Bissau; Côte d’Ivoire; Liberia	25 November 1992	Yurii Pyvovarov (Юрій Пивоваров)	Ambassador	28 April 2021	REF
Africa	South Africa	Countries: Mozambique; Botswana	16 March 1992	Liubov Abravitova (Любов Абравітова)	Ambassador	14 April 2020	REF
South America	Argentina	Countries: Paraguay; Uruguay; Chile	6 January 1992	Yuriy Klymenko (Юрій Клименко)	Ambassador	21 February 2023	REF
South America	Brazil	Countries: Bolivia; Guyana; Suriname	11 February 1992	Andrii Melnyk (Андрій Мельник)	Ambassador	20 June 2023	REF
South America	Peru	Countries: Colombia; Ecuador	7 May 1992	Yuriy Polyukhovych (Юрій Полюхович)	Ambassador	23 December 2022	REF
North America	Canada	—	27 January 1992	Yuliya Kovaliv (Юлія Ковалів)	Ambassador	29 March 2022	REF
North America	Cuba	Countries: Venezuela; Honduras; Dominica; Nicaragua; El Salvador	12 March 1992	Iryna Kostyuk (Ірина Костюк)	Ambassador	4 May 2022	REF
North America	Mexico	Countries: Belize; Guatemala; Costa Rica; Panama	14 January 1992	Oksana Dramaretska (Оксана Драмарецька)	Ambassador	12 August 2020	REF
North America	United States	Countries: Antigua and Barbuda; Trinidad and Tobago; Bahamas?; Marshall Islands; Federated States of Micronesia; Palau; Jamaica	21 January 1992	Oksana Markarova (Оксана Маркарова)	Ambassador	25 February 2021	REF
Oceania	Australia	Countries: Vanuatu; Kiribati; New Zealand; Nauru; Samoa; Solomon Islands; Tonga; Tuvalu; Fiji	10 January 1992	Vasyl Myroshnychenko (Василь Мирошниченко)	Ambassador	1 April 2022	REF
Asia	China	Countries: Mongolia	4 January 1992	Pavlo Riabikin (Павло Рябікін)	Ambassador	June 2023	REF
Asia	India	Countries: Bangladesh; Maldives; Nepal; Sri Lanka; Bhutan	17 January 1992	Oleksandr Polishchuk (Олександр Поліщук)	Ambassador	20 June 2023	REF
Asia	Indonesia	Countries: Papua New Guinea	11 June 1992	Vasyl Hamianin (Василь Гамянін)	Ambassador	30 July 2021	REF
Asia	Iraq	—	16 December 1992	Oleksandr Buravchenkov (Олександр Буравченков)	Temporary Plenipotentiary	January 2019	REF
Asia	Israel	—	26 December 1991	Yevhen Korniychuk (Євген Корнійчук)	Ambassador	October 2020	REF
Asia	Japan	Countries: Philippines	26 January 1992	Sergiy Korsunsky (Сергій Корсунський)	Ambassador	14 April 2020	REF
Asia	Jordan	—	19 April 1992	Myroslava Shcherbatiuk (Мирослава Щербатюк)	Ambassador	22 July 2020	REF
Asia	Kazakhstan	—	23 July 1992	Serhii Pavlenko (Сергій Павленко)	Ambassador	—	REF
Asia	Kyrgyzstan	—	19 September 1992	Valery Zhovtenko (Валерій Жовтенко)	Ambassador	25 January 2019	REF
Asia	Kuwait	—	18 April 1993	Mykola Dzhydzhora (Микола Джиджора)	Chargé d'Affaires	June 2024	REF
Asia	Lebanon	—	14 December 1992	Yurii Kasyanov (Юрій Касьянов)	Ambassador	—	REF
Asia	Malaysia	Countries: East Timor	3 March 1992	Denys Mykhailiuk (Денис Михайлюк)	Chargé d'Affaires	—	REF
Asia	Palestine	—	2 November 2001	Mykola Leshchenko (Микола Лещенко)	Minister-Counselor	—	REF
Asia	Qatar	—	13 April 1993	Andrii Kuzmenko (Андрій Кузьменко)	Ambassador	18 December 2019	REF
Asia	Saudi Arabia	Countries: Oman; Yemen	14 April 1993	Anatolii Petrenko (Анатолій Петренко)	Ambassador	21 January 2022	REF
Asia	South Korea	Countries: North Korea	10 February 1992	Dmytro Ponomarenko (Дмитро Пономаренко)	Ambassador	February 2022	REF
Asia	Singapore	Countries: Brunei	31 March 1992	Kateryna Zelenko (Катерина Зеленко)	Ambassador	14 November 2020	REF
Asia	Tajikistan	Countries: Afghanistan	24 April 1992	Valeriy Yevdokimov (Валерій Євдокимов)	Ambassador	2022	REF
Asia	Thailand	Countries: Laos; Myanmar	6 May 1992	Pavlo Orel (Павло Орел)	Chargé d'Affaires	—	REF
Asia	Turkmenistan	—	10 October 1992	Viktor Maiko (Віктор Майко)	Ambassador	30 December 2020	REF
Asia	United Arab Emirates	Countries: Bahrain	15 October 1992	Dmytro Senik (Дмитро Сенік)	Ambassador	May 2022	REF
Asia	Uzbekistan	—	25 August 1992	Mykola Doroshenko (Микола Дорошенко)	Ambassador	2020	REF
Asia	Vietnam	Countries: Cambodia	23 January 1992	Oleksandr Haman (Олександр Гаман)	Ambassador	December 2021	REF

== See also ==
- Public diplomacy of Ukraine
