= Shcherbatiuk =

Shcherbatiuk (Ukrainian: Щербатюк) is a Ukrainian surname. Notable people with the surname include:

- Myroslava Shcherbatiuk (born 1974), Ukrainian diplomat
- Roman Shcherbatiuk (born 1997), Ukrainian kickboxer
