= Liubov Abravitova =

Ukrainian diplomat

- Любов Абравітова
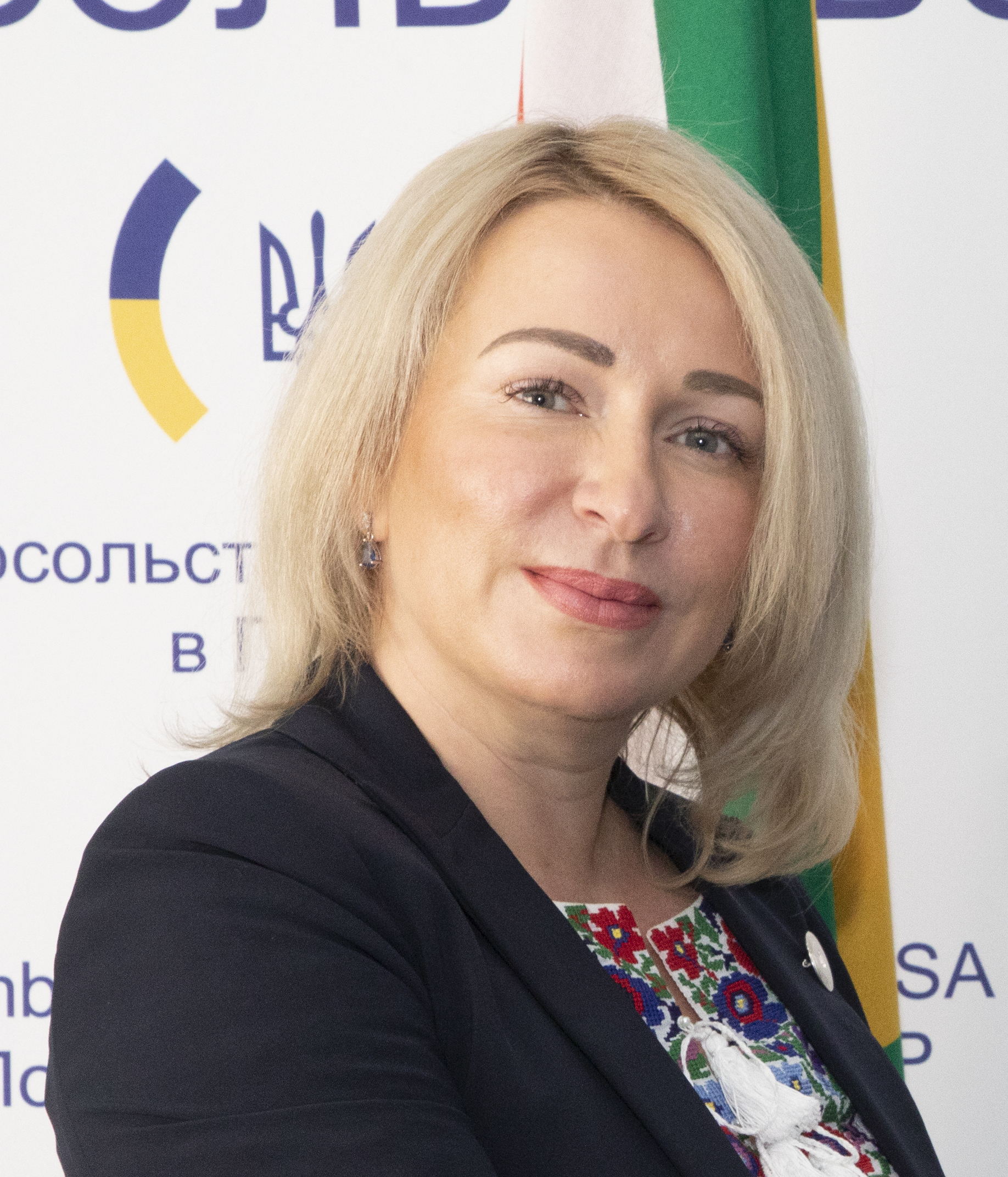
- Abravitova in 2022

Ambassador of Ukraine to South Africa
- In office 19 November 2020 – 21 July 2025
- President: Volodymyr Zelenskyy
- Preceded by: Taras Kuzmych

Personal details
- Born: 5 November 1980 (age 45) Bender, Moldavian SSR, Soviet Union (now Moldova)
- Education: Odesa National University (BA); University of Geneva (MAS)
- Profession: Diplomat

Liubov Aleksandrivna Abravitova (Ukrainian: Любов Олександрівна Абравітова; born 5 November 1980) is a Ukrainian diplomat who served as the Ukrainian Ambassador to South Africa from 2020 to July 2025, as the Ambassador to Botswana from 2021 until 2024 and Mozambique from 2021 until 2025.

== Early life and education ==
Abravitova was born on 5 November 1980 in Bender in the Moldavian Soviet Socialist Republic and grew up in Odesa, Ukraine. She graduated from the Odesa National University with a Bachelor of Arts in International Relations and then from the University of Geneva with a Master of Advanced Studies specialising in European security issues.

== Diplomatic career ==
Abravitova started working for the Ministry of Foreign Affairs in March 2003. She has been overseas in Ottawa (Canada), Brussels (Belgium), and Geneva (Switzerland). While stationed in Belgium, she served as the vice-consul and was responsible for Belgium and Luxembourg. Between 2007 and 2009, she was press attaché at the Ministry of Foreign Affairs.

Abravitova was the Counsellor of the Middle East and Africa Department of the foreign affairs ministry before she became counsellor of the Ukrainian embassy in South Africa in January 2017. She was appointed chargé d'affaire of Ukraine in South Africa in August 2019. On 14 April 2020, Abravitova was appointed Ambassador Extraordinary and Plenipotentiary of Ukraine to South Africa by president Volodymyr Zelenskyy. The Ukrainian Association of South Africa welcomed her appointment. She presented her credentials to South African president Cyril Ramaphosa on 19 November 2020.

On 17 June 2021, Abravitova was appointed Ambassador Extraordinary and Plenipotentiary of Ukraine to Botswana as well as to Mozambique on a non-resident basis by Zelenskyy. She presented her letters of credence to Mozambican president Filipe Nyusi on 17 September 2021 and to Botswana president Mokgweetsi Masisi on 20 October 2021.

Following the opening of resident Ukrainian embassies in Bostwana and Mozambique in 2024, Abravitova was dismissed as ambassador to Botswana by Zelenskyy and replaced with Oleksiy Syvak on 19 August. She was dismissed as ambassador to Mozambique and replaced with Rostyslav Tronenko on 8 January 2025.

On 21 July 2025, Abravitova was dismissed as ambassador to South Africa by Zelenskyy.

=== Russo-Ukrainian War ===
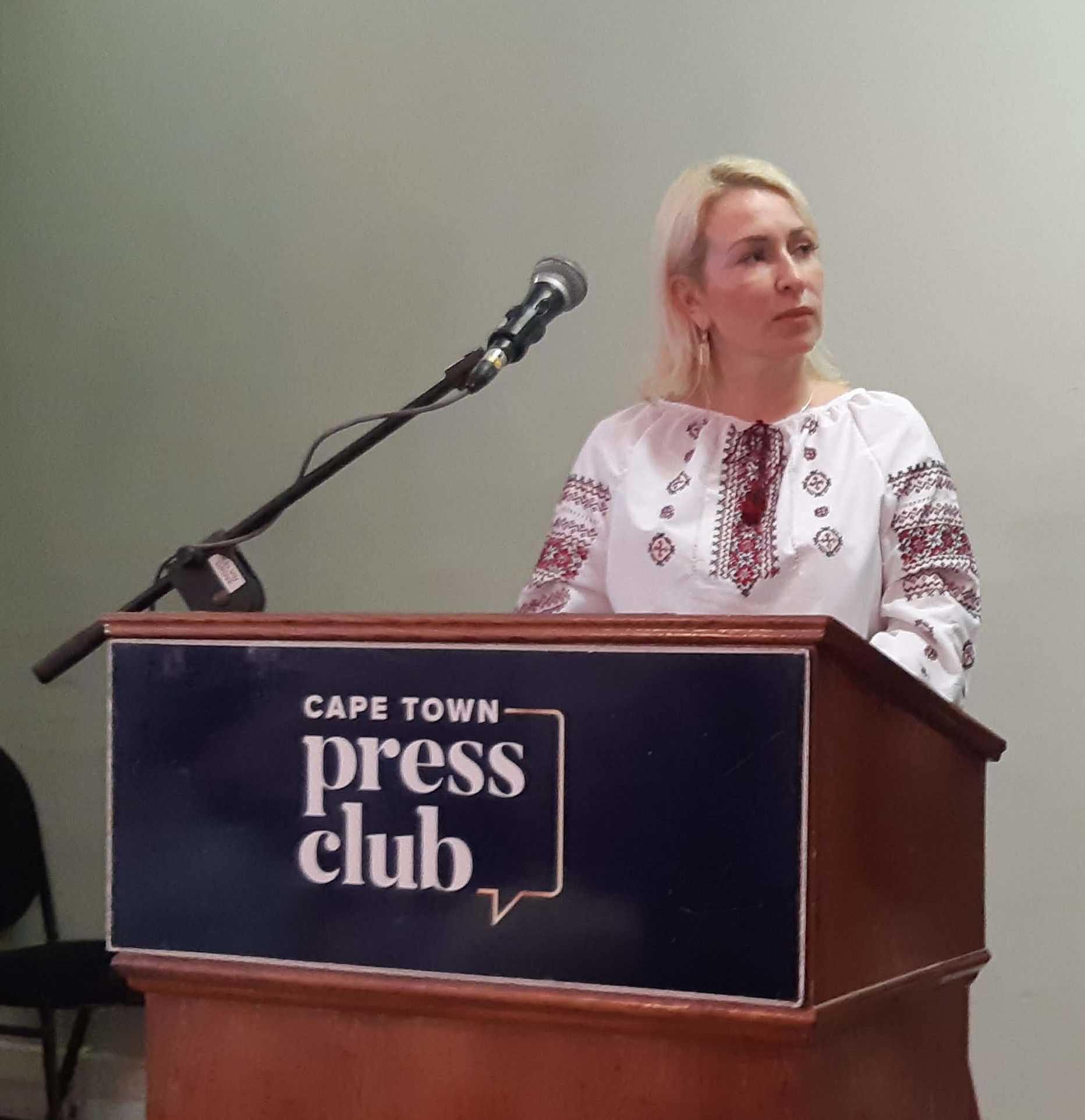
Abravitova addresses the Cape Town Press Club on 11 March 2022

On 3 March 2022, Abravitova described South Africa's decision to abstain on a United Nations General Assembly vote to condemn Russia's invasion of Ukraine as "puzzling" and "unacceptable".

On 10 April 2022, Abravitova made a tweet in which she said that 45 days after Russia initiated a full-scale invasion of Ukraine, she had not had a requested meeting with South African president Ramaphosa and International Relations and Cooperation minister Naledi Pandor. The tweet was criticised by the Deputy Director-General of the Department of International Relations and Cooperation, Clayson Monyela. Abravitova responded to Monyela's criticism by saying that her people are "dying, tortured, raped."

On 19 November 2024, Abravitova called on the South African government to be consistent in its calls for world peace amid its inconsistent stance on the Russian invasion of Ukraine while it held a proactive stance on the Gaza war.

== Personal life ==
Abravitova is fluent in Ukrainian, English, Russian and French.
