= Garreth Bloor =

South African politician

Garreth Bloor is President of the Canada-Africa Chamber of Business in Toronto and a South African founder of a venture capital firm. Previously he was elected to the Cape Town City Council in 2011 and subsequently appointed to the Mayoral Committee in February 2013. He served a second Mayoral executive role heading Tourism, Events and Economic Development until the end of his term, having previously served as Mayoral head of Economic, Environment and Spatial Planning.

== Education ==
Bloor studied at the undergraduate and graduate level at the University of Cape Town. He served as Vice President the Student Representative Council in 2008 and currently is a member of the university's board.

== Career ==
Prior to taking up an elective office Bloor worked as a journalist with BSkyB and Avusa (currently Times Media Group), with assignments in Washington, D.C. According to the African Leadership Network he was also involved in various start-up companies.

=== Politician ===
Bloor was first elected to the Cape Town City Council in 2011. He was appointed chair of the directorate portfolio committee for Economic, Environment and Spatial Planning in July 2011, and then as a member of the Mayoral Committee in 2013, by far the youngest serving member of the city executive. On his appointment Executive Mayor Patricia De Lille stated: "He has taken the lead in not only driving major projects of economic growth initiatives through his committee but has undertaken extensive engagements with external stakeholders, both domestic and abroad, especially in the business community".

=== Private Sector ===
Bloor set up Glenheim (Pty) Ltd in 2016, a financial advisory firm focused on venture capital and deal making. In 2017, as MD of Glenheim, he was named an Ideas Scholar by the Aspen Institute ahead of the annual Aspen Ideas Festival in Aspen, Colorado.

== Memberships ==
Bloor is an associate at the Parliamentary Institute of South Africa and as a member of the advisory board to the Sable Accelerator.

== Recognition ==
In 2008 he received a Culture of Enterprise Award from former US Attorney General Edwin Meese III for his research into "enterprise and a humane economy"

The Cape Town Press Club awarded him its Graduate Bursary Award in 2010, recognising "over 500 articles published locally and abroad with contributions to over a dozen publications undertaken".

He was ranked 16th on the Democratic Alliance's 2014 Western Cape Parliamentary list for the National Assembly, a seat the party won as the Official Opposition in the South African Parliament. He however remained in the city government's executive to head Tourism, Events and Economic Development in a second Mayoral executive post which concluded in 2016.

St Gallen University in Switzerland named him one of the Top 100 global Leaders of Tomorrow at their annual symposium in May 2014.
