= Cape Town Press Club =

- Abbreviation: CTPC
- Formation: 1975; 51 years ago
- Type: Press club
- Chairpersons: Brent Meersman; Twanji Kalula
- Secretary: Lalage Maurer
- Website: capetownpc.org.za

The Cape Town Press Club is the oldest press club in South Africa. Founded in 1975 as a voluntary association of journalists, it has since become a non-profit organisation supporting freedom of the press. It is based in Cape Town, South Africa and hosts public and private gatherings with invited speakers from public life.

The Press Club is a popular venue for speeches by South African politicians and also for speeches by prominent figures in academia and business. It has hosted all five post-apartheid South African presidents. Foreign visitors have included Dick Clark in 1977, David Aubrey Scott in 1977, Jesse Jackson in 1990, David Blunkett in 2008, and Annie Lennox in 2013. Since 2007 the Press Club has held the Barry Streek Memorial Lecture on an annual basis.

== History ==
The oldest press club in South Africa, the Cape Town Press Club was relaunched in 1975 after a period of stagnancy. The relaunch was pioneered by Cape Times journalist Tom Copeland and continued by his colleague John Scott. In later decades, Donwald Pressly played an important role in the club's maintenance.

Because of its location in the legislative capital of Cape Town, the Press Club was historically dominated by parliamentary reporters, such as Pressly. Full membership in the club was available only to working journalists until the late 1990s, when a single category of membership was established for all interested parties regardless of profession. Nonetheless, on some accounts, a rival press club was established in Pretoria in 1978 due to dissatisfaction with the predominance of public relations professionals in the Cape Town club.

The Press Club was formerly based at the Café Royal on Church Street, in Cape Town CBD, but in the 21st century it has lacked a permanent venue. However, it frequently held events at the Kelvin Grove Club in Newlands, a venue sometimes regarded as the "colonial home of the Mother City's ageing gin-blossomed Wasp elite" or "one of Cape Town's bastions of the privileged English liberal establishment". As a result, journalists teased the Press Club for drawing "a predominantly white, elderly audience including the city's media stalwarts who keep the Press Club alive".

As of 2012, the Press Club had over 500 members, including 133 businesspeople, 125 journalists, and 86 public relations professionals; to cover its costs, it relied not on membership dues but on corporate sponsorship.

== Scholarships ==
In December 2003, the Press Club awarded its first Cape Town Press Club Award for investigative journalism, intended to sponsor in-depth reporting on a story of the recipient's choice. The first award, worth R20,000 and sponsored by Telkom, was given to John Yeld, an environment writer for the Cape Argus, for reporting on property developments in the Western Cape.

After Press Club deputy chairperson Barry Streek died in 2006, the Press Club established the Barry Streek Memorial Bursary, an annual award of R20,000 to a journalism student. Its endowment is funded by donations and by ticket revenues from the Barry Streek Memorial Lecture, which has been held annually since 2007.

== Leadership ==
The Press Club Committee is elected annually. Its current co-chairpersons are Brent Meersman and Twanji Kalula.

== Notable events ==
- In December 1972 at a mixed-race ball hosted by the Press Club, Zulu leader Mangosuthu Buthelezi danced with the white wife of journalist AI Venter, provoking a national controversy and calls for a government inquiry. Venter threatened to sue the newspapers which reported that his wife had invited Buthelezi to dance.
- In May 1976 at the Press Club, Prime Minister John Vorster expressed willingness to negotiate with American President Gerald Ford over Southern Rhodesia and Namibia. Henry Kissinger said in his memoirs that Vorster's remarks provided the impetus for dialogue between the United States and South Africa.
- In November 1986, Cape Times editor Tony Heard drew "the biggest-yet attendance at a Cape Town Press Club meeting" when he gave a speech on press freedom shortly after being arrested for publishing an interview with a banned person, activist Oliver Tambo, in violation of the Internal Security Act.
- In May 1990 at the Press Club, Thabo Mbeki briefed the media on the first day of negotiations over the Groote Schuur Minute.
- President Nelson Mandela delivers the opening address at the Cape Town Press Club's 21 anniversary event in 1996.
- In March 2007 at the Press Club, Helen Zille announced her campaign to become federal leader of the Democratic Alliance.
- In April 2007 at the Press Club, Jacob Zuma confirmed that he would stand for the presidency of the African National Congress "if asked to".
- In October 2013 at the Press Club, Marius Fransman claimed that 98 per cent of "landowners and property owners" in Cape Town were Jewish, sparking an antisemitism row.
- During Jacob Zuma's presidency, Evita Bezuidenhout delivered an annual Luthuli Housekeeping Report at the Press Club as a satirical alternative to the State of the Nation Address.
- In October 2019 at the Press Club, John Steenhuisen announced his campaign to become federal leader of the Democratic Alliance.
- In March 2022 at the Press Club, Ukrainian Ambassador, Liubov Abravitova, confirms that whilst South African President Cyril Ramaphosa had twice talked with Russian President Vladimir Putin since the start of Russia's invasion of Ukraine, President Ramaphosa had made no effort to have similar communication with officials in the Ukrainian government.
- South African President Cyril Ramaphosa spoke about internal efforts at reforming the governing African National Congress (ANC) at the Press Club in the runup to the 2024 South African general election which saw the ANC lose the popular majority for the first time in 30 years.

== Barry Streek Memorial Lectures ==
- 2007: Kader Asmal
- 2009: Helen Zille
- 2010: Allister Sparks
- 2011: Colin Eglin
- 2012: F. W. de Klerk
- 2013: Tony Leon
- 2014: Patricia de Lille
- 2015: Mmusi Maimane
- 2016: R. W. Johnson
- 2017: Max du Preez
- 2018: Lindiwe Mazibuko
- 2019: Pippa Green
- 2020: Anton Harber
- 2022: Gwen Lister
- 2023: Jonathan Jansen
- 2024: Cheryl Carolus
- 2025: Imtiaz Sooliman
- 2026: Sam Sole

== Controversies ==
=== Membership policy ===
On 4 May 2012, Tina Joemat-Pettersson, then the Minister of Agriculture, withdrew from a breakfast speaking engagement at the Press Club because opposition politician Pieter van Dalen, a member of the club, was present in the audience. In the prologue to a series of mutual recriminations, her behaviour was criticised publicly by Yusuf Abramjee of the National Press Club, as well as by Cape Town Press Club chairperson Donwald Pressly. In response, Joemat-Pettersson released a statement that concluded with the barb, "We now finally understand why the majority of black reporters in the city are not members of the press club."

The governing African National Congress (ANC) defended Joemat-Petterson: party spokesman Jackson Mthembu argued that van Dalen's membership in the Press Club undermined its claim to being a professional and non-partisan organisation, and Chief Whip Mathole Motshekga proposed that the club should review its membership criteria to ensure that politicians did not "infiltrate the ranks of a press body". Pressly pointed out that the club's members included ANC politicians too. Nonetheless, Motshekga's suggestion provoked debate among the commentariat about the membership policies of press clubs. During a show at the Press Club the next month, Evita Bezuidenhout satirised Joemat-Pettersson's behaviour.

=== Steve Hofmeyr ===
In October 2016, the Press Club cancelled a scheduled event featuring Steve Hofmeyr, a musician noted for his right-wing political views. The club was criticised both for scheduling the engagement and for cancelling it.

=== Parliament ===
In November 2017, when asked by administrators of the South African Parliament to "alert" Press Club members to an upcoming parliamentary briefing, Pressly (then serving as the club's full-time secretary) sent a WhatsApp that read, "What is so important about ANC thugs wanting to advertise their press conference which is NOT our function". Parliament issued a public statement which quoted the content of the message and condemned it as an "astonishingly vitriolic attack on the Presiding Officers of Parliament". The Press Club distanced itself from Pressly's message, and it later said that he had been "severely sanctioned".

=== Racial composition ===
In a front-page article in August 2018, the Cape Times reported that, at its recent annual general meeting, the Press Club had elected an "all-white, predominantly male" committee. The newspaper quoted critical reactions from parliamentary spokesperson Moloto Mothapo, who Tweeted that the Press Club "has reverted to its old pre-1994 self", and from provincial ANC leaders: ANC provincial secretary Faiez Jacobs called on the Press Club to appoint a more demographically representative committee, and ANC legislator Cameron Dugmore said that the development was "deeply disappointing" and that the Press Club "owe[d] everyone an explanation". In response the Press Club explained that, due to a shortfall of candidates, everybody who had volunteered to serve on the committee had been appointed, and that it intended to co-opt additional black members if any volunteered.

Later the same week, the Cape Times printed the resignation letter of Joylene van Wyk, a black journalist at Landbouweekblad who had served as the Press Club's co-chairperson until she failed to gain re-election at the 2018 general meeting. Van Wyk told the newspaper that she was resigning her membership because of the Press Club's elitism, saying, "It's got that elitist vibe, with black journalists sitting on the side, and the elite eating cake." In later editions, the newspaper printed van Wyk's further allegations that the Press Club had been captured by commercial interests, particularly the newspaper the Cape Messenger. The Press Club strongly denied her allegations, and Ed Herbst suggested in an opinion piece that the Cape Times's reporting was part of a personal attack on Pressly by Iqbal Survé, Pressly's former employer, whose Sekunjalo vehicle owned the newspaper.

== Gallery ==
Gallery of Press Club events
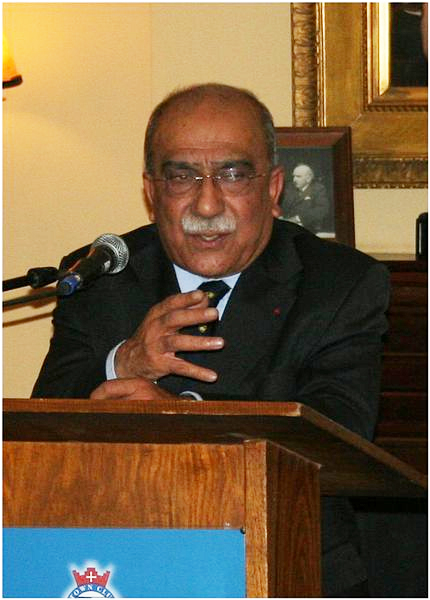
Kader Asmal delivers the inaugural Streek lecture, 2007

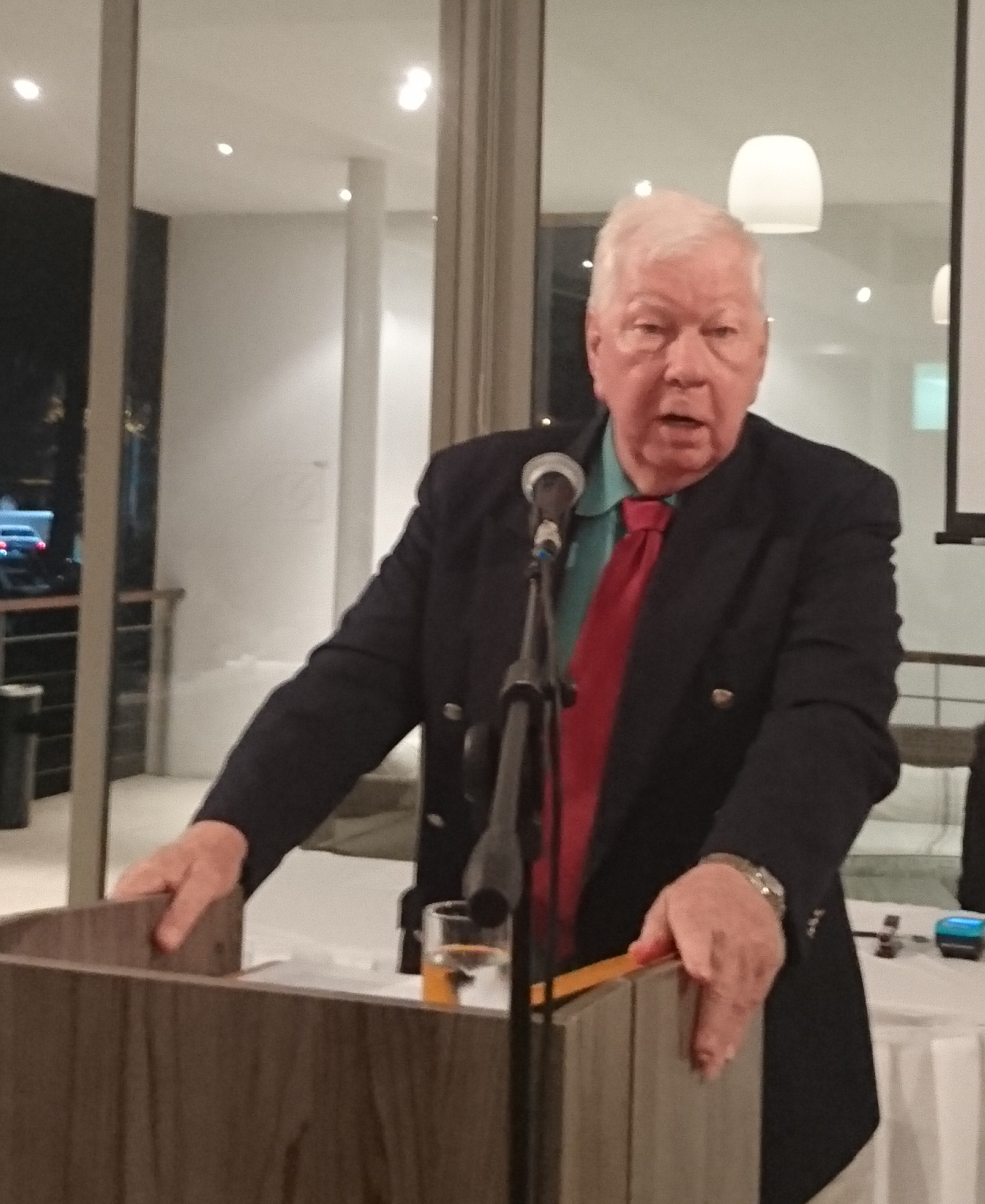
R. W. Johnson delivers the Streek lecture, 2016

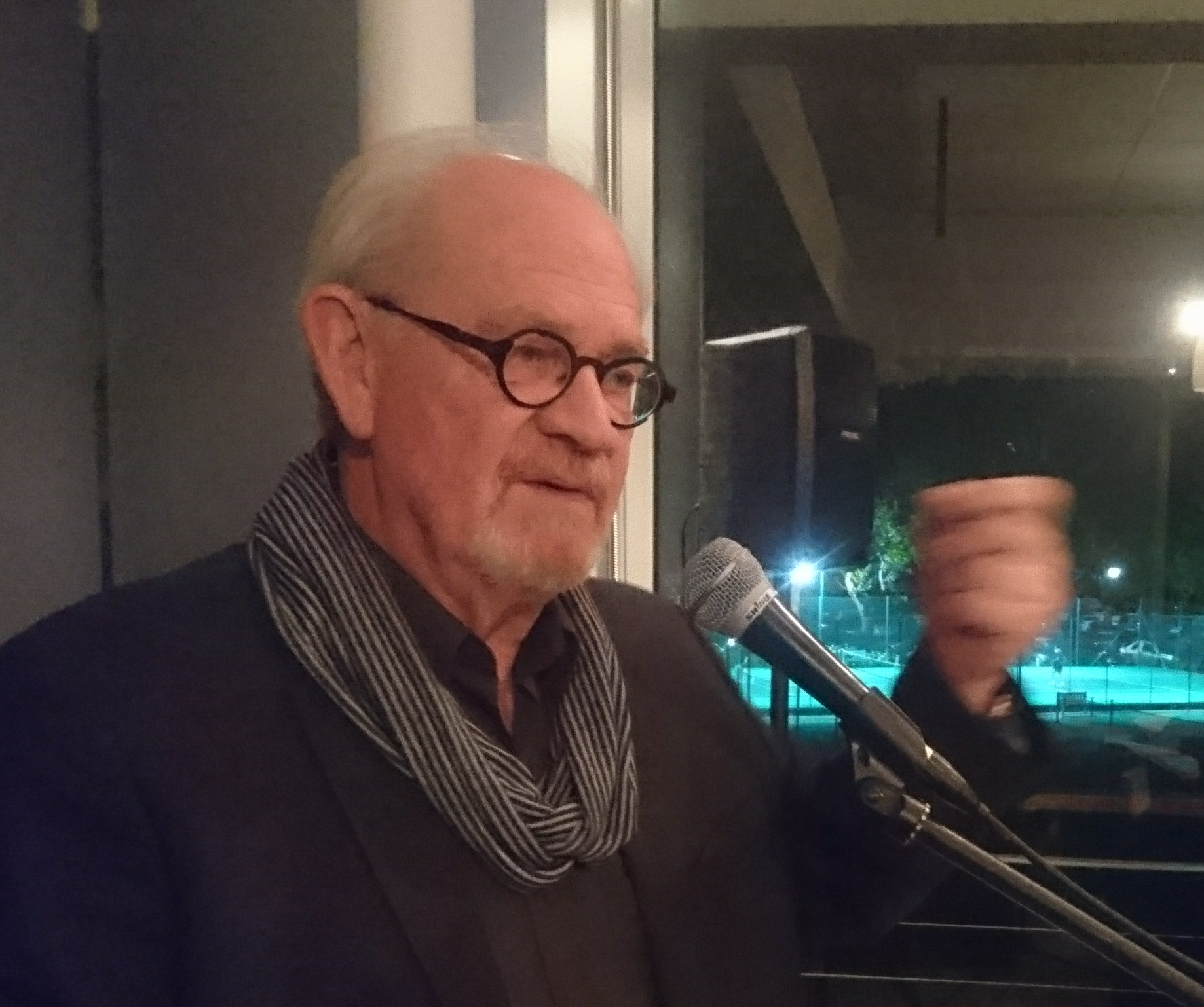
Max du Preez delivers the Streek lecture, 2017

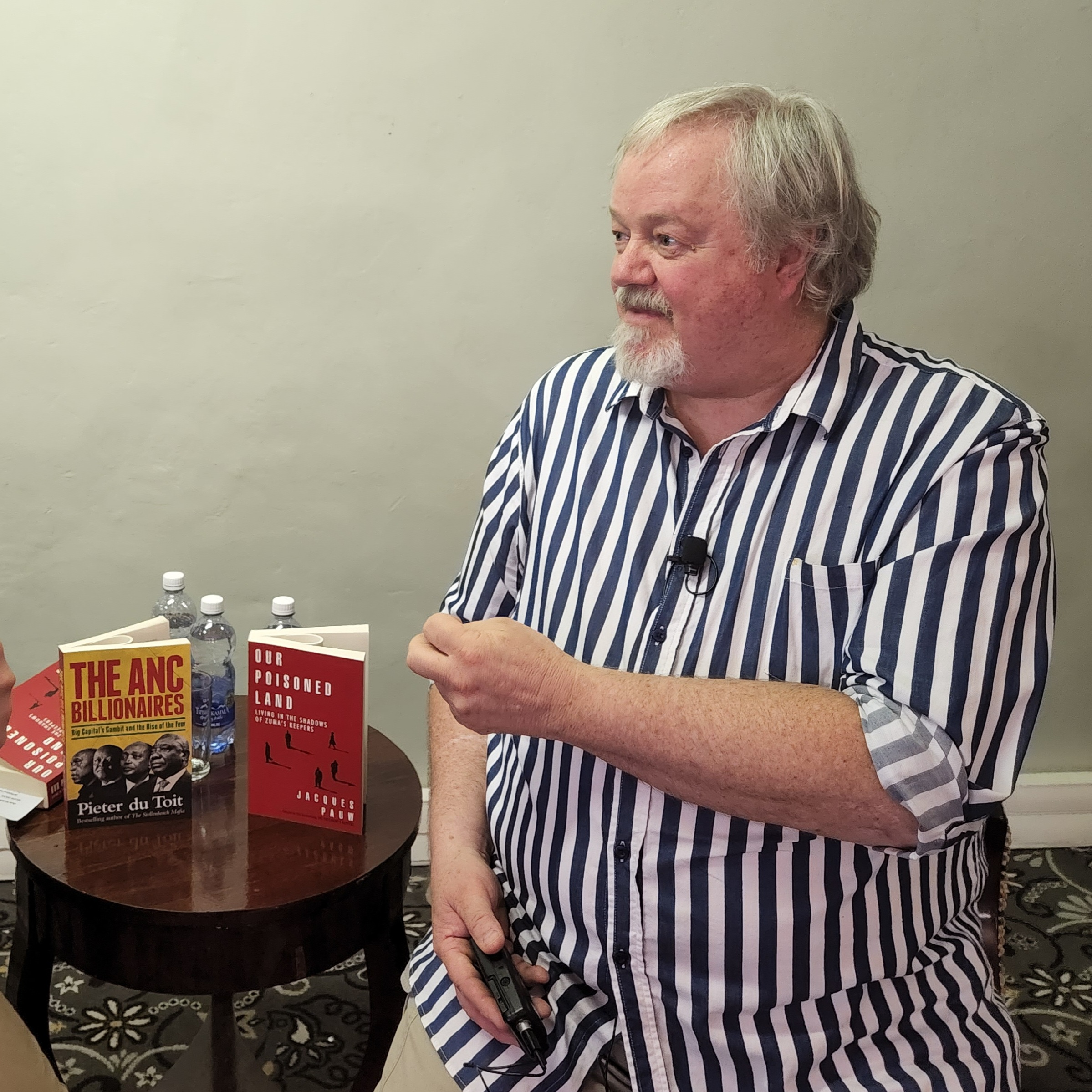
Jacques Pauw launches Our Poisoned Land, 2022

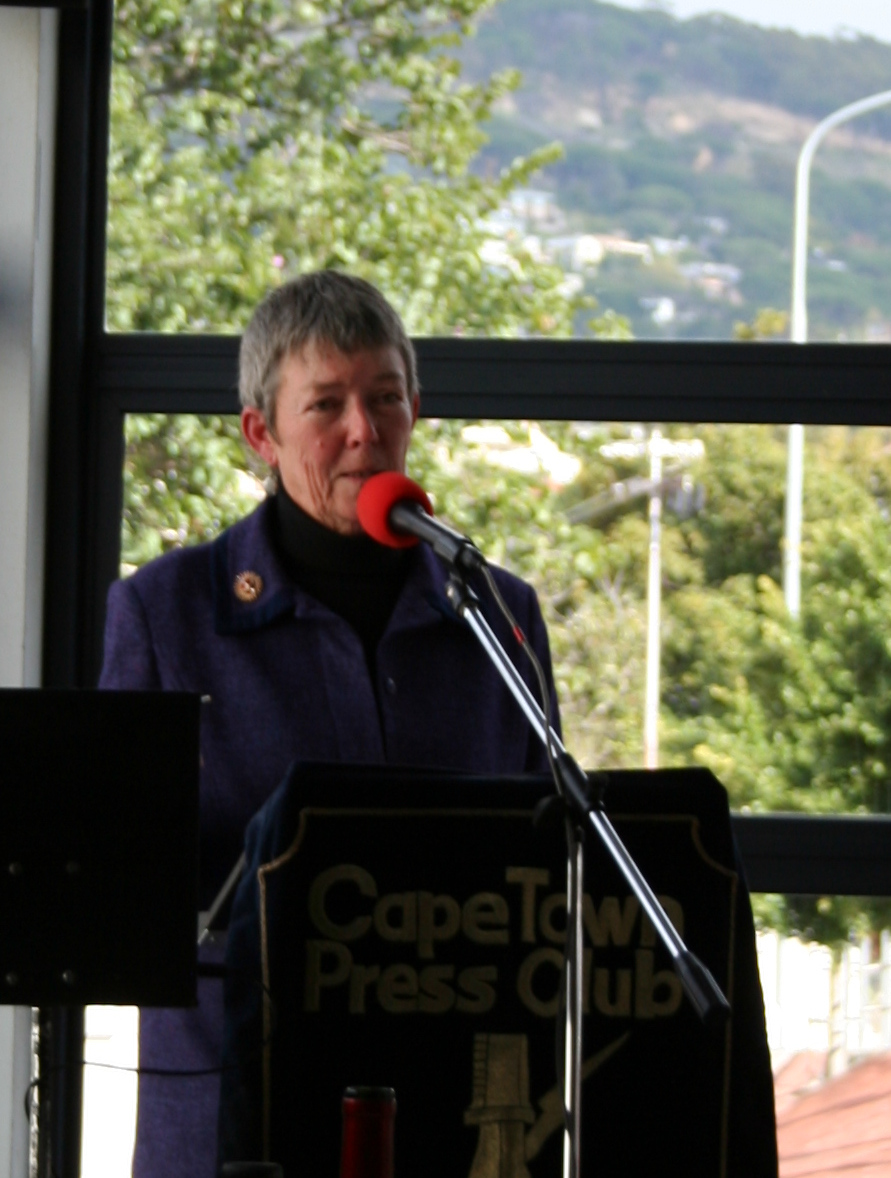
Judith Todd discusses human rights in Zimbabwe, 2007.

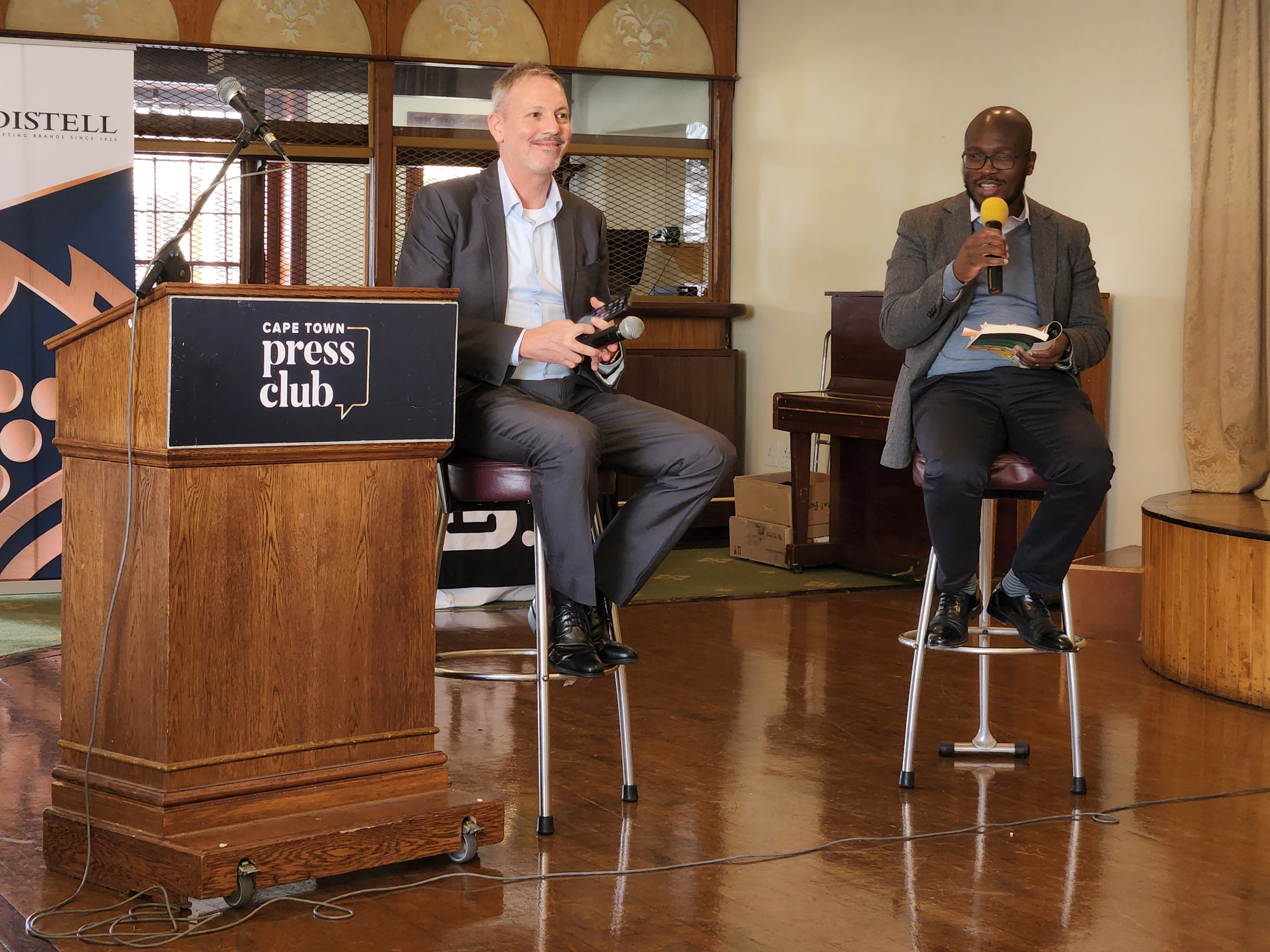
Mpumelelo Mkhabela discusses cadre deployment by the ANC, 2022

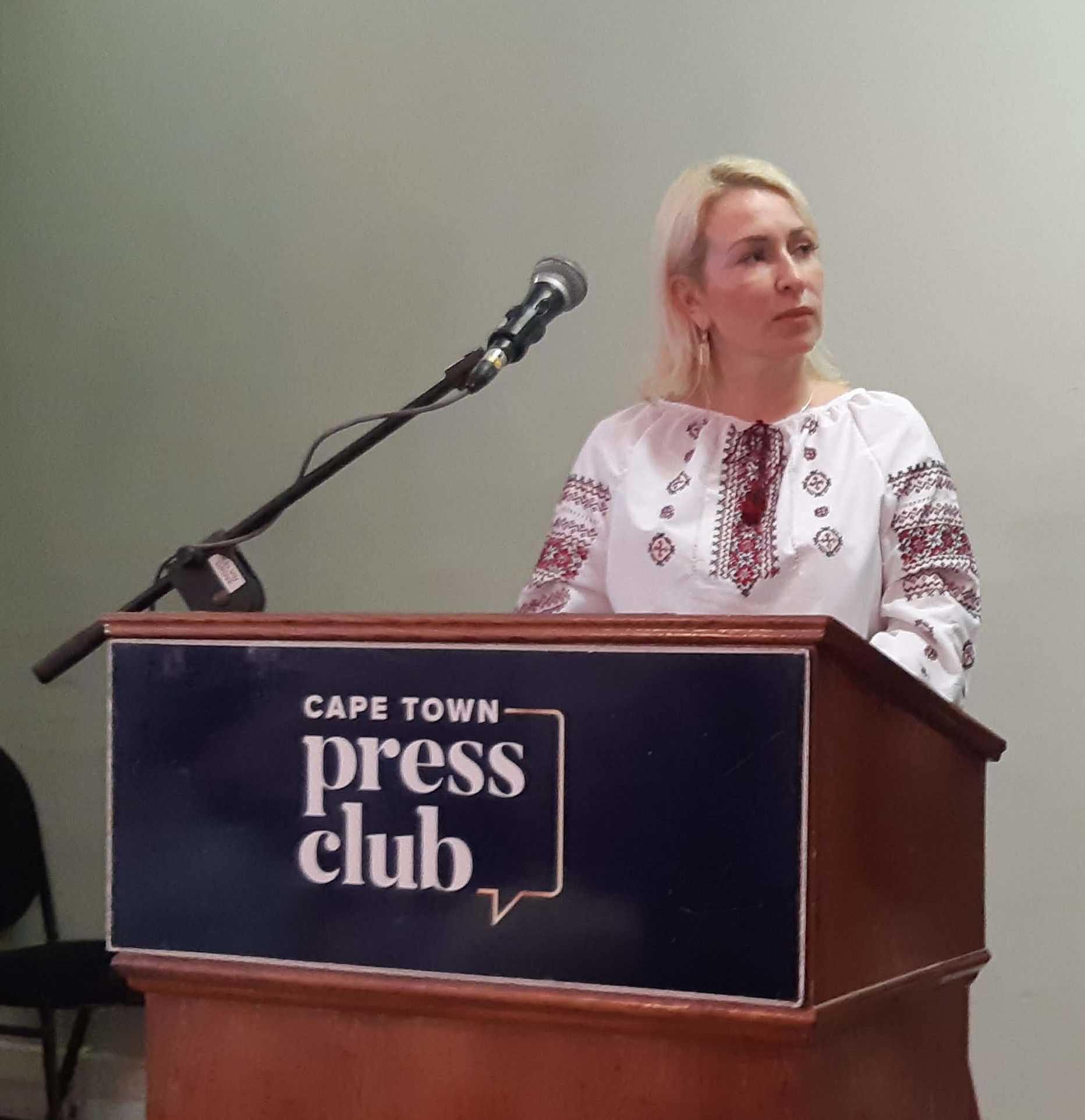
Ukrainian Ambassador Liubov Abravitova following the Russian invasion of Ukraine, 2022.

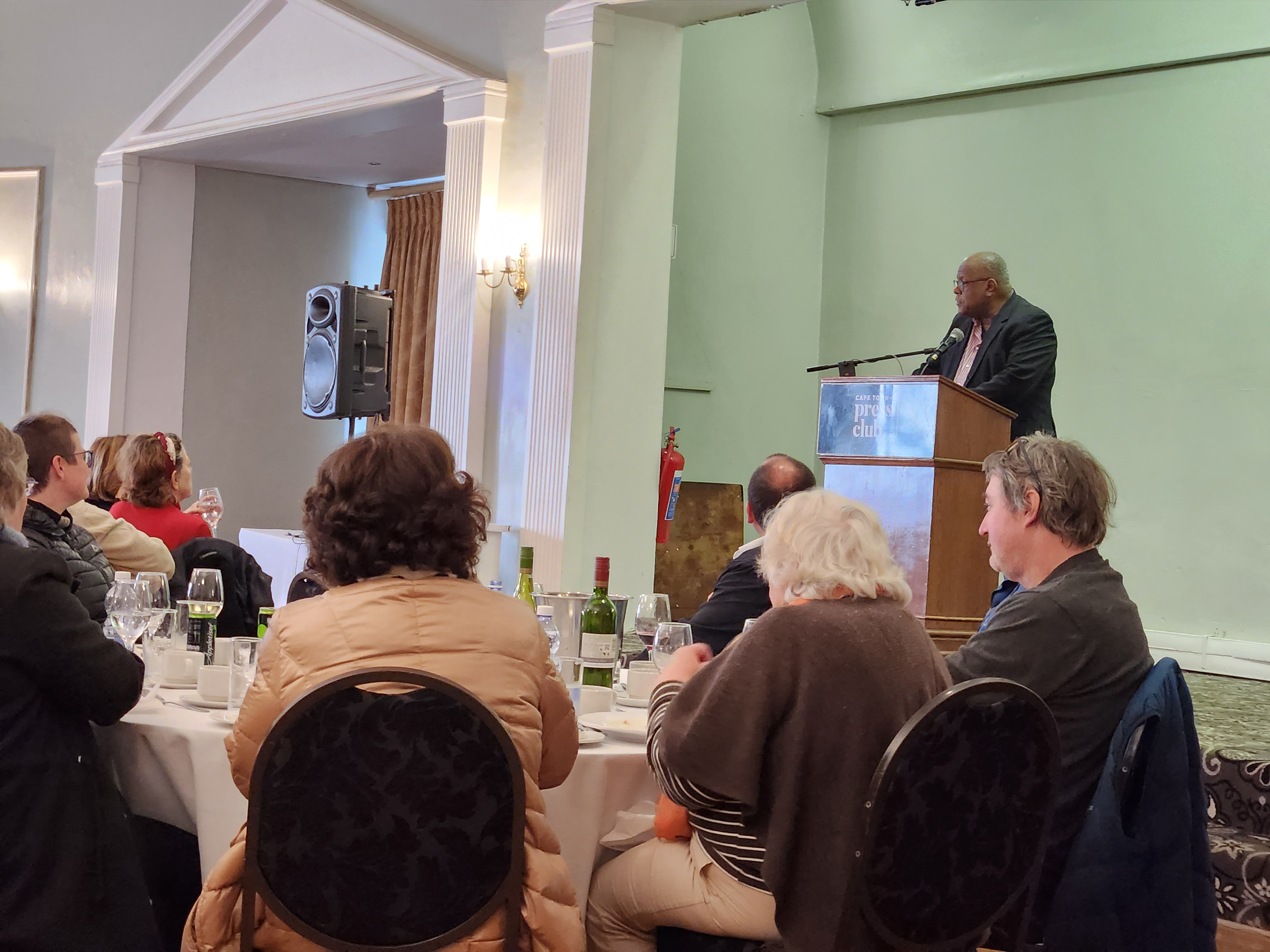
Prof. Jonathan Jansen delivers the Streek Lecture, 2023.

== See also ==
- Mass media in South Africa
- Newspapers in South Africa
- Freedom of expression in South Africa
