= List of ambassadors of Ukraine to Mexico =

Ambassador of Ukraine to Mexico

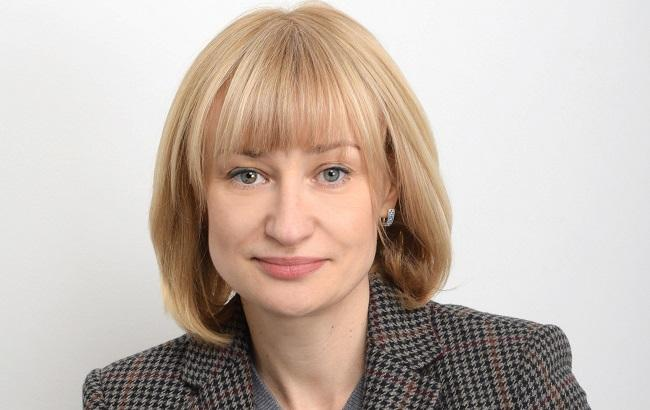
- Incumbent; Oksana Dramaretska since 2020
- Nominator: Volodymyr Zelenskyy
- Inaugural holder: Oleksandr Taranenko as Ambassador Extraordinary and Plenipotentiary
- Formation: 1999
- Website: Ukraine Embassy - Mexico

The Ambassador Extraordinary and Plenipotentiary of Ukraine to Mexico (Ukrainian: Надзвичайний і Повноважний посол України в Мексиці) is the ambassador of Ukraine to Mexico. The current ambassador is Oksana Dramaretska. She assumed the position in 2020.

The first Ukrainian ambassador to Mexico assumed his post in 1999, the same year a Ukrainian embassy opened in Mexico City. Before 1999 the position was concurrently with the position of Ambassador Extraordinary and Plenipotentiary of Ukraine to the United States.

== List of ambassadors ==
=== Ukraine ===
- 2004–2006 – Oleksandr Taranenko
- 2006–2007 – Ruslan Spirin
- 2007–2012 – Oleksiy Branashko
- 2012–2020 – Ruslan Spirin
- Since 2020 – Oksana Dramaretska
