= Sarah Goldblatt =

- Born: Sarah Eva Goldblatt; 25 December 1889; London, United Kingdom
- Died: 22 May 1975 (aged 85); Cape Town, South Africa
- Education: Teachers' Training College, Cape Town
- Writing career
- Language: Afrikaans
- Genre: Poems
- Notable works: Liefdes kransie Wolf en jakhals versies I/II
- Notable awards: Molteno Medal

Sarah Eva Goldblatt (25 December 1889 – 22 May 1975) was a South African journalist, teacher, and literary editor of C.J. Langenhoven's writing. She is the first woman to have poems published in Afrikaans.

== Biography ==
=== Early years ===
Goldblatt was born on 25 December 1889 in London as the eldest of four children to David Nathan Goldblatt and Fanny Esther Smith. Her parents were German-speaking Jews from Russian Poland, who had emigrated to England shortly before her birth. Sarah had two brothers, and a sister, Rebecca. Her father, who was born in Radom, was educated in a yeshiva, but had also received secular education in Berlin and Warsaw and was known as an outspoken socialist and Yiddishist. They arrived to South Africa in 1897.

=== Education ===
As a child, she already learned to speak German and English fluently. Her family emigrated to Cape Town in 1897, where she attended the St. Martini School on Queen Victoria Street, and helped her father's small printing business and bookstore in Cape Town. Through private tuition in Cape Dutch with Mr. CJ van Rhijn and self-study, she later obtained the school completion certificate (skooleindsertifikaat) and after that, she qualified to work as a primary school teacher at Cape Town Training College in 1911 when she received the T3 certificate for primary education.

=== Teaching career ===
She started to work as a teacher for a year at Cape Town Commercial College and in 1912, she began teaching at the Commercial Evening School in Oudtshoorn. When she found out there was a vacancy in the newspaper Het Zuid-Westen, which was edited by C.J. Langenhoven, which she obtained and joined the editorial staff in September 1912; they ran this newspaper together until the beginning of 1915. It is at this time that the very close friendship between them started to be forged. At the time of her appointment, she was not yet fully fluent in Afrikaans, but she learned the language and soon shared Langenhoven's passion for it. The collapse of the ostrich markets and the outbreak of the First World War hurt the newspaper business, and due to financial difficulties, it ceased operations at the beginning of 1915. Goldblatt went back to teach at the Commercial Evening School in Oudtshoorn and on Wynands River in the Oudtshoorn district, and on weekends she returned to do typing work for Langenhoven.

In January 1916, she began to work as a teacher at the farm school in Leeublad in the George district. In the middle of 1917, she returned to Cape Town and later settled in Mowbray in a house she called Luluerai. From October 1917 to May 1918, she was the first woman part of the editorial staff of the Afrikaans journal Die Burger. At the same time, she began to work as an editor for C.J. Langenhoven's manuscripts at Die Burger and National Press. Due to financial constraints, Die Burger had to cut staff in 1918 and she was laid off, although she received a letter of recommendation from the editor, Dr. Daniël François Malan. After her term at Die Burger, she was involved in the founding of the financial company Die Suid-Afrikaanse Nasionale Trust en Assuransie Maatskappij Beperk (South African National Trust and Assurance Company Limited), which is today known as Sanlam and continued to teach in Afrikaans at Simonstad Primary School and East Park Primary School, and then for three terms at Tokai Public School, which later became Simon van der Stel Primary School. She subsequently taught Afrikaans at Retreat and then from January 1922 at the Cape Town Training College. Later, she taught at Central Girls High School in Roeland Street in Cape Town.

In 1924, she passed the matriculation examination and thereafter also obtained the Higher Primary Education Diploma with distinction and passed the highest Taalbon examination. At the same time, she also completed courses in Psychology, Biology, and Zoology and also studied further in German and Dutch. From 1940 to 1944, she worked at Brooklyn Primary School in Cape Town, and after her official retirement at the end of 1944, she continued teaching at the Herschel Girls' School, the Christian Brothers in Sea Point and the Training College for Kindergarten Teachers in Claremont. Throughout her career, she also gave private classes in Afrikaans to high school students, immigrants, diplomats, and Members of the South African Parliament at her home. As a teacher, she was known for her support of the development of the Afrikaans language and the introduction of this language as a medium of instruction for all classes. She served as a member of the South African Education Union and was a chairperson of the Cape branch of this association, and was also one of the founders of the Cape School Radio Service. In later years she focused on nursing education.

== Curator of CJ Langenhoven's works ==
After Langenhoven's death in July 1932, she acted as the literary curator of his legacy as per his request and spent most of her time marketing it. Her first big task was to publish “Versamelde Werke” and at the same time she initiated the preservation of Arbeidsgenot, Langenhoven's house in Oudtshoorn. As early as 1935, she gave radio talks for the South African Broadcasting Corporation about Langenhoven and his work, and throughout her life, she repeatedly gave occasional speeches and wrote articles in newspapers and magazines about him and his work. In 1943, she worked as an advisor to the production team in charge of the filming of Langenhoven's “Donker spore”, even though this film was a failure. In 1973, she also organized the centennial anniversary of his birth in Oudtshoorn.

== Literary career ==
Although Elisabeth Eybers is widely described as Afrikaans' first published woman poet, Goldblatt's collection "Liefdes kransie" appeared 16 years before Eybers' debut. However, this volume is rather children's verses, suitable for pupils in primary and middle school. She also translated Mary Shelley's "The Cloud", which was highly regarded by Langenhoven. However, her poetry was judged dismissively and with the second edition of Wolf en jakhals versies, her poetic career came to an end. Some of her verses are included in the collections “Nuwe klein verseboek” and the anthology from the Dutch writer Gerrit Komrij's Die Afrikaanse poësie in 'n duisend en enkele gedigte (Afrikaans poetry in a thousand and one poems).

As an editor, she edited C.J. Langenhoven's Versamelde werke in 1933 and all revisions thereof, until the centenary edition of 1973. Together with Louis Herrman, she edited Janus: A bilingual anthology / 'n Tweetalige bloemlesing, presenting works of well-known South African English and Afrikaans writers. She also wrote articles for South African Jewish newspapers, such as The Zionist Record and Hashalom. She also designed an education program in Afrikaans language and literature for the South African Zionist Youth Movement Habonim Dror Southern Africa.

== Works ==
- Liefdes kransie (1920)
- Wolf en jakhals versies I: Beer is gulsig en Jakkals is slim
- Wolf en jakhals versies II: Leeu is kwaad en Jakkals lag

=== As a literary editor ===
- Versamelde werke from C.J. Langenhoven (1933)
- Janus: A bilingual anthology / 'n Tweetalige bloemlesing (1962)

== Honors ==
In 1964, she received the Molteno Medal from The Cape Tercentenary Foundation in recognition of her work as executor of Langenhoven's literary legacy. In 2003, Leonie van Zyl obtained an MA degree from the University of Stellenbosch with a dissertation on her life and work, entitled “Sarah Goldblatt: letterkundige administratrise van C.J. Langenhoven”.

== Death ==
She started to lose her eyesight shortly after Langenhoven's 100th-anniversary events and she spent the last months of her life in the Stikland institution, where she died on 22 May 1975 in Cape Town. Her remains were buried on the grounds of Arbeidsgenot, Langenhoven's house in Oudtshoorn.

== Family ==
Her brother Israel Goldblatt became a known lawyer in Namibia during its South African administration. It is believed that Goldblatt was in a relationship with Langenhoven and that they had a child together in 1925, and that the relationship was known by Langenhoven's wife. Her great-niece Dominique Malherbe wrote the memoir Searching for Sarah/Op Soek Na Saartjie, in which she details the relationship of her great-aunt with Langenhoven, who called her affectionately by her Afrikaans nickname, ‘Saartjie'.
