= J. R. L. Kingon =

John Robert Lewis Kingon FRSE, FLS
- Died: 30 May 1969; South Africa
- Education: University of Edinburgh
- Occupations: Missionary, author, amateur botanist, conservation campaigner
- Known for: Early campaign to protect the Addo elephant herd
- Awards: Honorary DSc, Ghent University

John Robert Lewis Kingon FRSE FLS (died 1969) was a missionary noted for his work in South Africa, an author on religious education and an amateur botanist. He was also an early (and successful) campaigner for animal conservation.

== Life ==
He studied theology at the University of Edinburgh then undertook further studies in South Africa.

In 1918 he was elected a Fellow of the Royal Society of Edinburgh. This appears linked to his botanical rather than theological interests. His proposers were Cargill Gilston Knott, Joseph Shield Nicholson, Robert Wallace and George Alexander Carse.

In 1919/1920 Kingon became involved in an early wildlife conservation debate in South Africa. The elephant population of the "Addo herd" had been depleted from 119 to only 16 specimens in only one year, largely at the hands of a single big game hunter, Major P J Pretorius. Kingon successfully campaigned for the protection of the remaining 16 elephants. This led to the establishment of the Addo Elephant National Park.

In the 1920s he worked in partnership with Rev Douglas and Rev Marsh on the extension of Bible studies throughout the population in South Africa. In 1923 the Bible Institute of South Africa was founded in Mowbray, Cape Town. When the college relocated to Kalk Bay one of the campus buildings was named "Kingon' in his honour. Kingon represented the United Free Church of Scotland in this group. Due to his connections to the Afrikaans community the University of Ghent awarded him an honorary doctorate (DSc).

He died in South Africa on 30 May 1969.

== Publications ==
- Science and Progress in South Africa (1916)
- The Education of Primitive People (1922)
- A Survey of Aboriginal Place Names (1925)
