= Zelda Jongbloed =

South African journalist and politician

Shadow Deputy Minister of Public Service and Administration
- In office 1 January 2017 – 21 July 2018
- Preceded by: Andricus van der Westhuizen
- Succeeded by: Jaco Londt

Shadow Deputy Minister of Agriculture, Forestry and Fisheries
- In office 5 June 2014 – 1 January 2017
- Preceded by: Pieter van Dalen
- Succeeded by: Pieter van Dalen

Member of the National Assembly
- In office 21 May 2014 – 21 July 2018
- Constituency: Western Cape

Personal details
- Born: 3 October 1950 Great Brak River, South Africa
- Died: 21 July 2018 (aged 67) Mowbray, Cape Town, South Africa
- Party: Democratic Alliance
- Occupation: Politician; Journalist

Zelda Jongbloed (née Erasmus; 3 October 1950 – 21 July 2018) was a veteran South African journalist and politician. She was a Member of the National Assembly for the Democratic Alliance from 2014 to 2018. She was Shadow Deputy Minister of Agriculture, Forestry and Fisheries and Shadow Deputy Minister of Public Service and Administration. Jongbloed worked for the Rapport and Die Burger in senior positions.

== Life and career ==
Zelda Erasmus was born on 3 October 1950 in Great Brak River in the Cape Province. She obtained a BA degree in education from the University of the Western Cape. She later achieved an MA degree in journalism from Rhodes University.

She had been a journalist for 40 years. She began her career as a cadet reporter for the Cape Herald. In 1976, she and her then-husband started the Herald Het Suid Western weekly newspaper in the town of George. By that time, she had also started doing work for the Rapport newspaper.

In 1979, Jongbloed was appointed a senior journalist at the now-defunct Evening Post in Port Elizabeth. She was then employed by a private company in Namibia and worked for the company for a long period. In 1981, she became a senior journalist at the Rapport newspaper. In 1986, she was appointed editor of the Rapport Ekstra. Jongbloed was later promoted to the post of deputy editor of the Rapport.

In 2010, she was named acting editor of Die Burger Eastern Cape. Jongbloed was also a political columnist for both the Rapport and Die Burger. She was the author of the consumer category "Kampvegter" in the Die Burger newspaper. In 2012, she stepped down from Naspers. At the time, Jongbloed was deputy editor of both the Rapport and Die Burger.

Following her election to the National Assembly of South Africa in May 2014, DA Parliamentary Leader Mmusi Maimane appointed her to the post of Deputy Shadow Minister of Agriculture, Forestry and Fisheries. She was appointed Shadow Deputy Minister of Public Service and Administration in November 2016.

She sat on several parliamentary committees. The committees included: the Portfolio Committee on Agriculture, Forestry and Fisheries, the Portfolio Committee on Public Service and Administration, and the Multiparty Women's Caucus Committee.

== Death and legacy ==
Jongbloed died of cancer on 21 July 2018 in her home in the Mowbray suburb of Cape Town. She was 67 at the time of her death. Upon her death, the Democratic Alliance released a statement in which they praised Jongbloed. Her funeral was held on 28 July 2018 in her hometown of Great Brak River.

== See also ==
- List of members of the National Assembly of South Africa who died in office
