= R. W. Johnson =

British journalist, political scientist and historian (1943–2026)

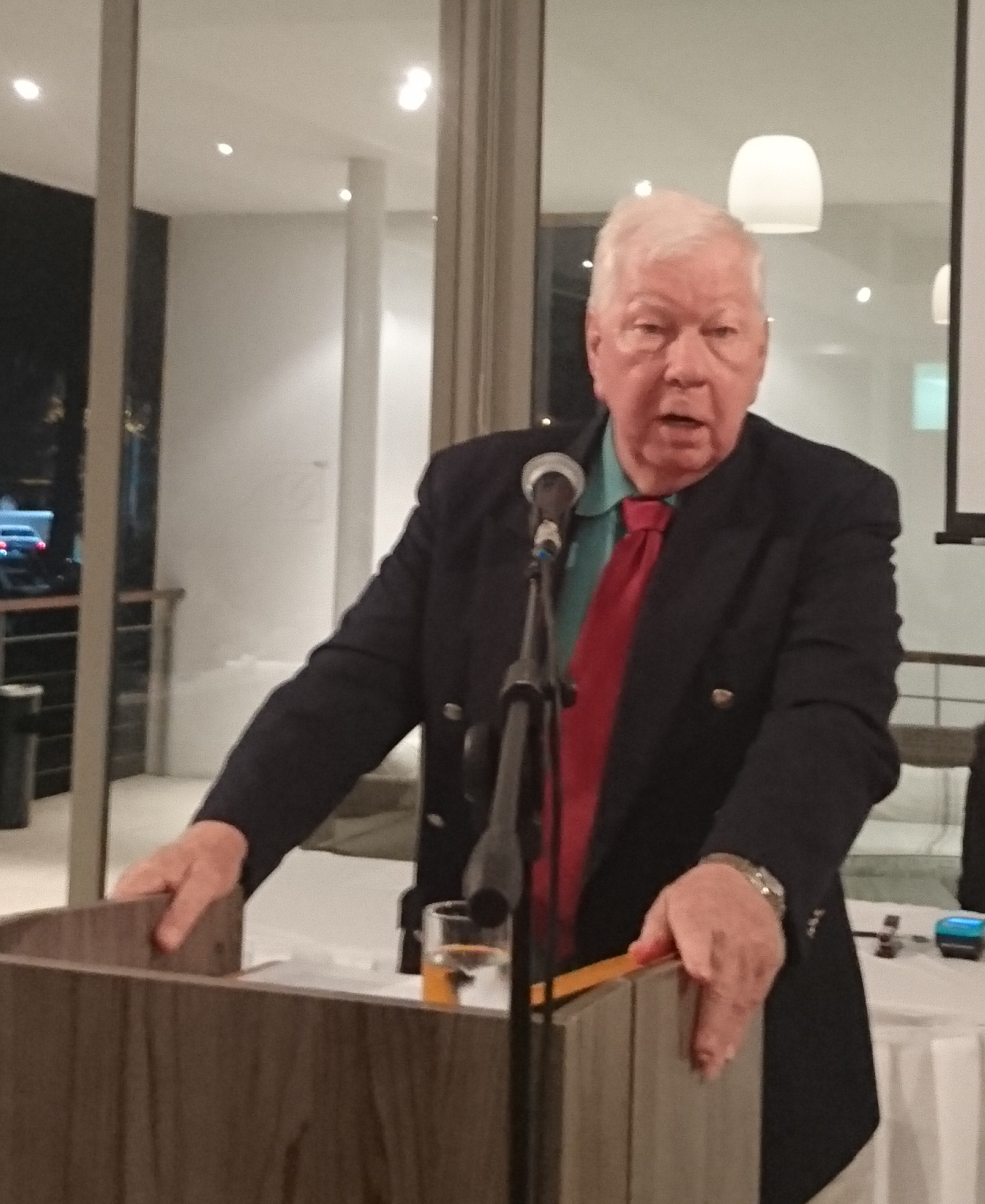
Johnson speaking at the 10th Barry Streek Memorial Lecture in Cape Town, South Africa, in 2016

Richard William Johnson (September 1943 – 21 July 2026) was a British journalist, political scientist and historian who lived in South Africa.

== Life and career ==
Richard William Johnson was born in England in September 1943. He was educated at Natal University and Oxford University, as a Rhodes Scholar. Johnson was a fellow in politics at Magdalen College, Oxford, for 26 years, and was an emeritus fellow until his death. His 2015 book Look Back in Laughter: Oxford's Postwar Golden Age is a memoir of his years at Magdalen, including his work with college president Keith Griffin to rescue the college's finances and buildings. In reviewing his memoirs, The Economist described Johnson as a "romantic contrarian liberal".

On his return to South Africa in 1995, Johnson became director of the Helen Suzman Foundation in Johannesburg until 2001. He has been a South Africa correspondent for the London Sunday Times and also written for the London Review of Books His articles for the LRB generally cover South African and to a lesser extent Zimbabwean affairs.

In early March 2009, Johnson injured his left foot while swimming. It became infected with necrotizing fasciitis, and his leg was amputated above the knee.

Johnson died from an infection in Cape Town, on 21 July 2026, at the age of 82.

== Criticism ==
Academic critics have raised concerns about Johnson's recent work, citing issues of accuracy, argumentation and the use of inflammatory but unevidenced claims.

In a 2025 Mail & Guardian article, Imraan Buccus criticised Johnson for publishing an article in BizNews in which he labelled the Islamic newspaper Al-Qalam "antisemitic", a claim Buccus characterised as unfounded and reflective of a wider tendency to make statements without substantiating evidence.

An earlier 2014 critique in Africa Is a Country by Benjamin Fogel described Johnson's evolution from a youthful radical to a right-leaning commentator, criticised his use of reductionist and stereotypical views of Africa and Africans, and noted a tendency to make sweeping and at times conspiratorial claims without evidence.

== Bibliography ==
- (ed. with Christopher Allen) African Perspectives (1970)
- How Long Will South Africa Survive? (1977)
- The Long March of the French Left (1981)
- Shootdown: The Verdict on KAL 007 (1985)
- Heroes and Villains: Selected Essays (1990)
- (ed. with Lawrence Schlemmer) Launching Democracy in South Africa: South Africa's First Open Election, April 1994 (1996)
- (ed. with David Welsh) Ironic Victory: Liberalism in Post-Liberation South Africa (1998)
- South Africa; The First Man, the Last Nation (2004)
- South Africa's Brave New World: The Beloved Country since the End of Apartheid (2009)
- How Long Will South Africa Survive?: The Looming Crisis (2015)
- Look Back in Laughter: Oxford's Postwar Golden Age (2015)
- Foreign Native: An African Journey (2020)
