= Mowbray, Cape Town =

Mowbray
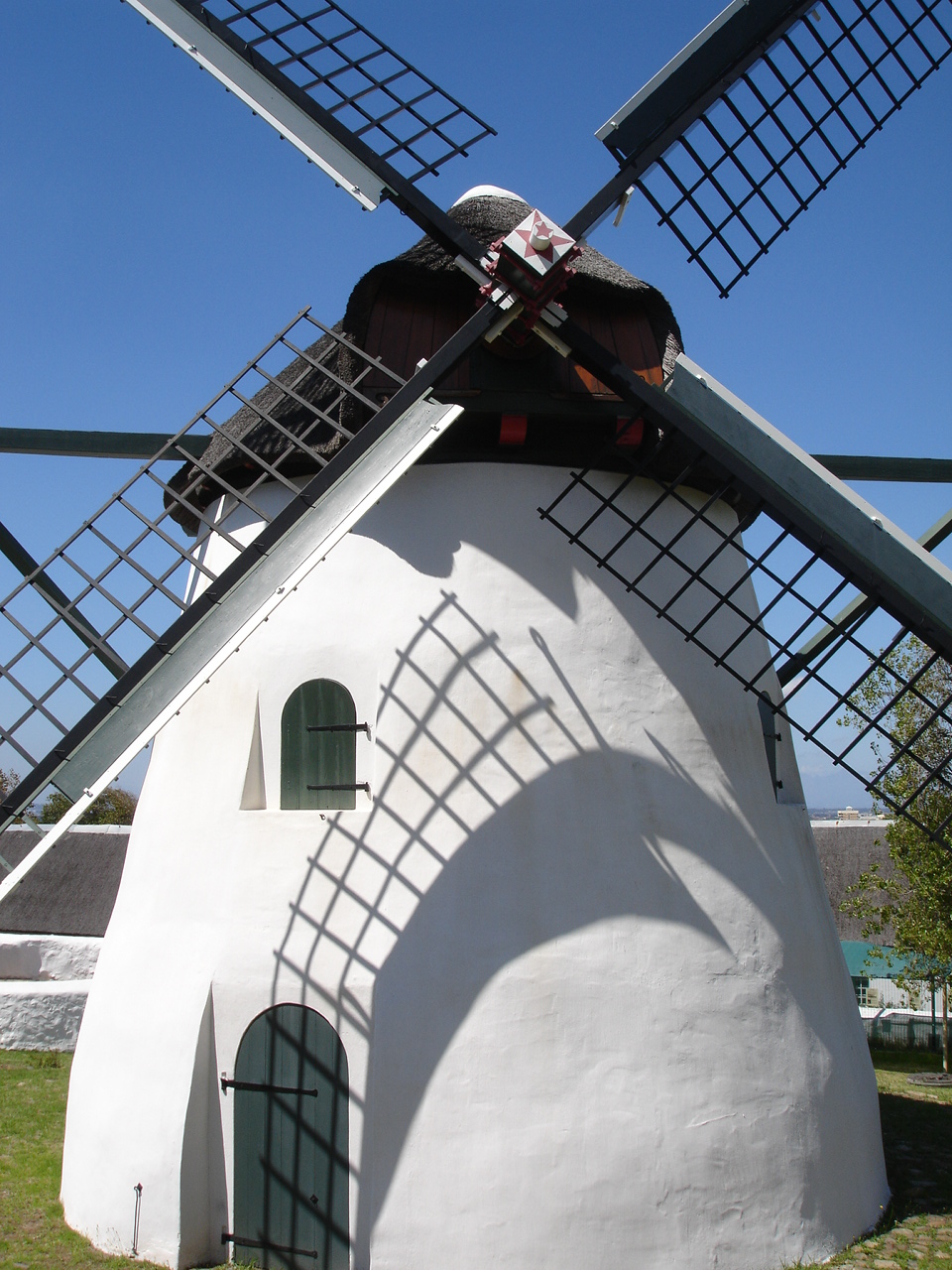
- Mostert's Mill, February 2008
- Interactive map of Mowbray
- Coordinates: 33°56′46″S 18°28′34″E
- Country: South Africa
- Province: Western Cape
- Municipality: City of Cape Town

Area
  - Total: 2.76 km^{2} (1.07 sq mi)

Population (2011)
  - Total: 4,726
  - Density: 1,710/km^{2} (4,430/sq mi)

Racial makeup (2011)
  - Black African: 44.2%
  - White: 36.1%
  - Coloured: 11.3%
  - Indian/Asian: 4.0%
  - Other: 4.3%

First languages (2011)
  - English: 68.0%
  - Afrikaans: 8.0%
  - Xhosa: 7.4%
  - Zulu: 2.1%
  - Other: 14.5%
- Time zone: UTC+2 (SAST)
- Postal code (street): 7700
- PO box: 7705

Mowbray is one of the Southern Suburbs of Cape Town, South Africa and lies on the slopes of Devil's Peak. Mowbray is at a junction of several major Cape Town freeways and has an important multi-modal public transport interchange at Mowbray railway station. Its original name was Driekoppen ("Three heads" in Dutch).

== Geography ==
Mowbray is bounded on the west by the M3 freeway, beyond which lies Devil's Peak, and on the north by the N2 freeway, beyond which lies the suburb of Observatory. Towards the east, the built-up area of Mowbray ends at the M5 freeway, beyond which lies the Black River and the suburb of Pinelands; however, the official boundaries of Mowbray also include the Rondebosch and Mowbray golf courses, which lie beyond the M5, towards Sybrand Park and Pinelands respectively. On the south, Mowbray borders on the suburb of Rosebank with a less well-defined boundary.

The Liesbeeck River flows from south to north through Mowbray, and separates the suburb into two distinct sections. The western section lies on the lower slopes of Devil's Peak, and contains most of the commercial development in the suburb. The eastern section, known as "Little Mowbray", lies on the low hill between the Liesbeeck and Black Rivers.

The well-known Quaker Peace Centre has its offices in Mowbray.

== Transport ==
Mowbray is well-connected to the road network, being bounded (as described above) by the M3, M5 and N2 freeways. Apart from the freeways, the main roads in the suburb are Main Road (M4) and Liesbeeck Parkway (M57), which run north-south; Victoria Road/St. Peter's Road/Durban Road/Klipfontein Road (M18) which runs west-east; and Raapenberg Road (M52) which runs to the north-east towards Pinelands.

For public transport, Mowbray is served by a station on the Metrorail Southern Suburbs railway line. Next to the station is a large Golden Arrow bus station with routes running out all over Cape Town, and a minibus taxi rank.

== Landmarks ==
State-funded Mowbray Maternity Hospital, the only of its kind in Cape Town, is located on Hornsey Road near Mowbray railway station. Mowbray Maternity Hospital is a referral hospital and provides comprehensive specialised maternity services spanning the three main stages of childbirth; Antenatal care, labour and delivery, and postnatal care.

Rhodes Memorial, built in memory of Cecil John Rhodes, lies on the slopes of Devil's Peak west of Mowbray near the M3 Highway. A national landmark, Rhodes Memorial lies within the Table Mountain National Park and was built with granite from the rock bases on which the mountain rests. The memorial site offers panoramic day time and night time views of the Cape Peninsula and Cape Town and is popular amongst tourists and locals.

The Mowbray Golf Course, adjacent to the N2 Highway, was established in 1910 and is recognised for being amongst the best in South Africa. It is an 18-hole golf course with a combination of links and parklands. The course has hosted the South African Open several times.

== Windmill ==
The only complete windmill in South Africa was Mostert's Mill. It was built in 1796 and worked until the 1860s. It was restored in 1935 and again in 1995 and was open to the public one Saturday a month. It was destroyed in a fire in April 2021, but three years later, it was fully restored.

== Notable residents ==
- Tim Harrell (1975), professional baseball player.
- Melt van Schoor (1967), Namibian professional cricketer.
- Rhoda Kadalie (1953-2022), activist and academic.
- Ivan Toms (1953-2008), physician and civil rights activist.
- Zelda Jongbloed (1950-2018), journalist and politician
- Gert Joubert (1948), Namibian businessman.
- Ray Watson-Smith (1940), South African first-class cricketer.
- Dudley Theophilus (1911-1936), first-class cricketer.
- Sarah Goldblatt (1889-1975), journalist, teacher, and literary editor.
- James Whitehead (1882-1940), South African first-class cricketer.
- Dorothea Bleek (1873-1948), anthropologist and philologist.
- Langham Dale (1826-1898), Cape Colony's second superintendent general of education
- J. R. L. Kingon, missionary and botanist.

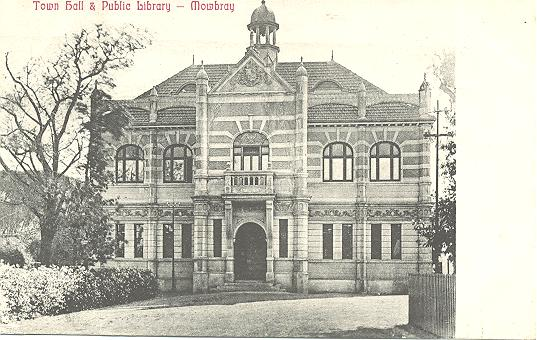
City Hall and Public Library (old postcard)
