= James Whitehead (South African cricketer) =

South African cricketer

James George Whitehead (June 1882 – 23 January 1940) was a South African cricketer who played first-class cricket for Warwickshire in a single match in 1902 and then for Western Province and Griqualand West from 1904–05 to 1920–21. He was born at Cape Town and died in the southern suburb of Mowbray. He was known, in English cricket at least, as "George Whitehead".

Whitehead was a protege of Walter Richards, the old Warwickshire cricketer who coached in South Africa, and returned with Richards with a view to joining the Warwickshire staff when qualified through residence. He was described as "a left-handed medium-paced bowler [who] makes the ball get up very quickly from the pitch" and a left-handed "promising" batsman, and had played for the Cape Town Cricket Club. In the event, as he was not qualified for County Championship games, he played only one first-class match for Warwickshire, the match against London County in 1902, scored just one run in his only innings and failed to take a wicket.

Whitehead returned to South Africa and from the 1904–05 season he played fairly regularly for Western Province as an opening bowler and lower-order batsman through to 1910–11, then for a couple of seasons with Griqualand West, returning to Western Province after the First World War. His bowling was often effective, and against Natal in 1908 he took seven second-innings wickets for 58 runs and 10 for 83 in the match, in which he bowled unchanged throughout. In a career of only 30 first-class matches, he took five or more wickets in an innings seven times.
