= George H. Guthrie =

American biblical scholar

George Howard Guthrie (born July 24, 1959, in Memphis, TN) is an American biblical scholar who is Professor of New Testament at Regent College in Vancouver, British Columbia. Guthrie holds a Ph.D. in New Testament Studies and is considered to be one of the premier authorities in the United States on the Book of Hebrews in the New Testament. He has authored numerous articles and books. Guthrie was Guest Lecturer at The Bible Institute of South Africa's Winter School in July 2018.

== Selected works ==
- Read the Bible for Life: Your Guide to Understanding & Living God's Word (Paperback), Broadman & Holman (January 1, 2011).
- Contributor to section on Hebrews in Commentary on the New Testament Use of the Old Testament (Hardcover), Baker Academic (November 1, 2007), ISBN 0-8010-2693-8, ISBN 978-0-8010-2693-5.
- section on Hebrews for the Zondervan Illustrated Bible Backgrounds Commentary. This book was awarded the Evangelical Christian Publisher's Association Gold Medallion for Reference Works and Commentaries.
- The Structure of Hebrews: A Textlinguistic Analysis, (Supplements to Novum Testamentum, 73. Leiden: E.J. Brill, 1994); republished by Baker Books in 1998.
- Biblical Greek Exegesis (Co-author J. Scott Duvall, Zondervan).
- NIV Application Commentary: Hebrews
- The Holman Guide to Interpreting the Bible (Co-authored with David S. Dockery), Zondervan Publishing House (May 2004).

=== Translation Projects ===
- The New Living Translation
- consultant to the Holman Christian Standard Bible, New Century Version and the English Standard Version.

=== Other projects ===
- Free Online Seminary Class on Hebrews from BiblicalTraining (Registration Required; Evangelical Perspective)
