= Tim Harrell =

South African baseball player

- Pitcher
- Born: 31 October 1975 (age 50); Mowbray, Cape Town, South Africa
- Bats: Right Throws: Right
- Stats at Baseball Reference

Timothy Allen Harrell (born 31 October 1975 in Mowbray, Cape Town) is a South African professional baseball player. In the 1998 MLB draft, Harrell was drafted in the 20th round (606th overall) by the Los Angeles Dodgers. He played minor league baseball from 1998 to 2002 with the Yakima Bears, San Bernardino Stampede, Vero Beach Dodgers and Jacksonville Suns.

== International ==
Harrell represented his native South Africa at the 2000 Summer Olympics. In two games, he threw 13.1 innings, giving up 6 earned runs, including a 10 inning, 4 strike out performance against the Netherlands.
