= Bible Institute of South Africa =

Coordinates: 34.1302°S 18.4473°E

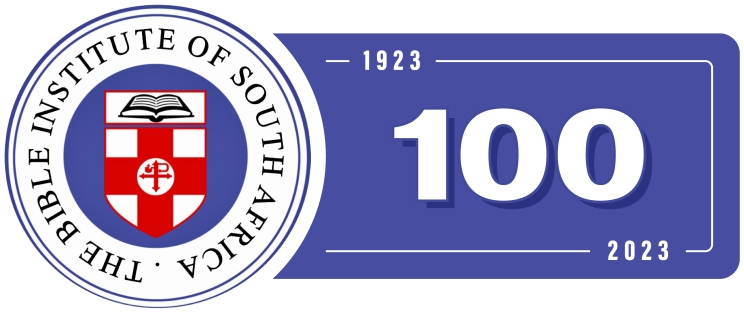
BISA Centenary logo 2023

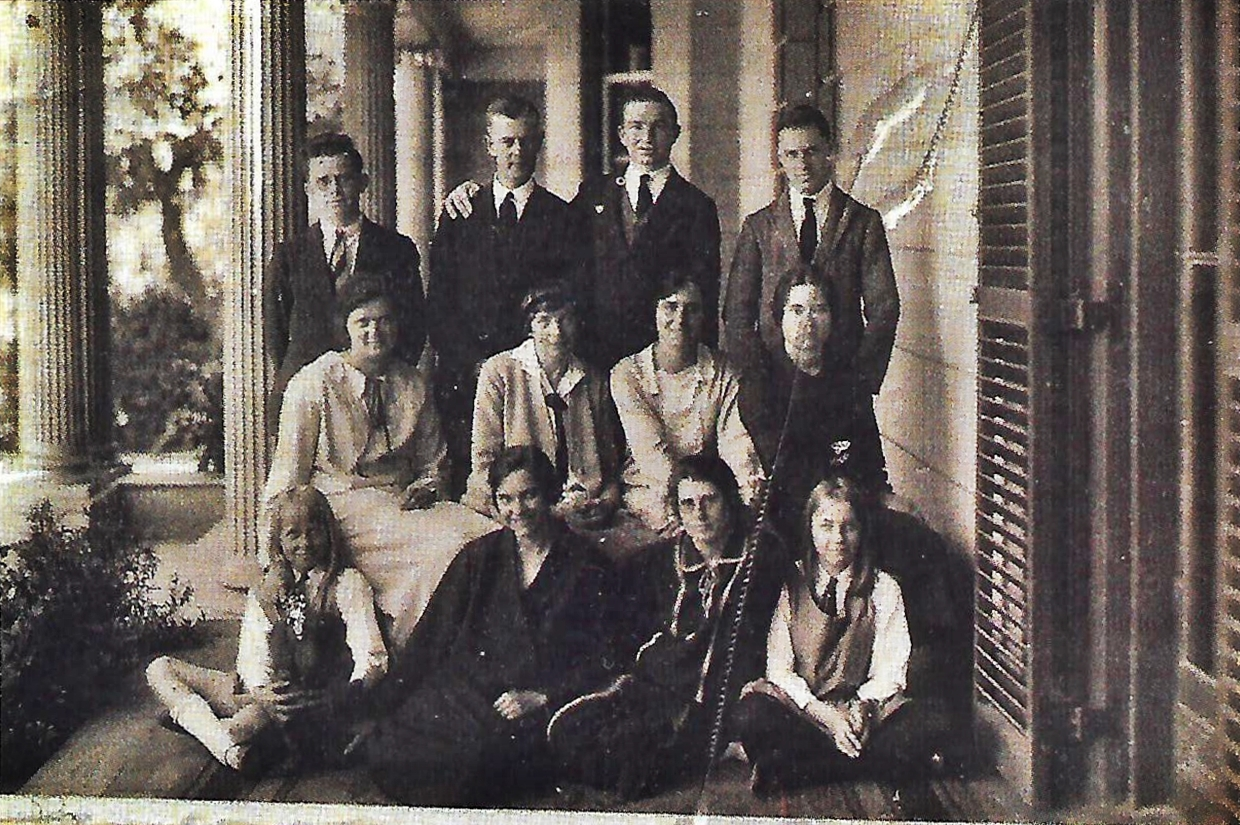
BISA students circa 1928, Mowbray, Cape Town

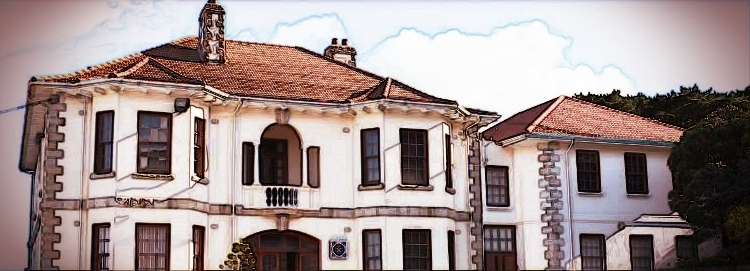
The Bible Institute of South Africa, founded in 1923 and situated in Cape Town.

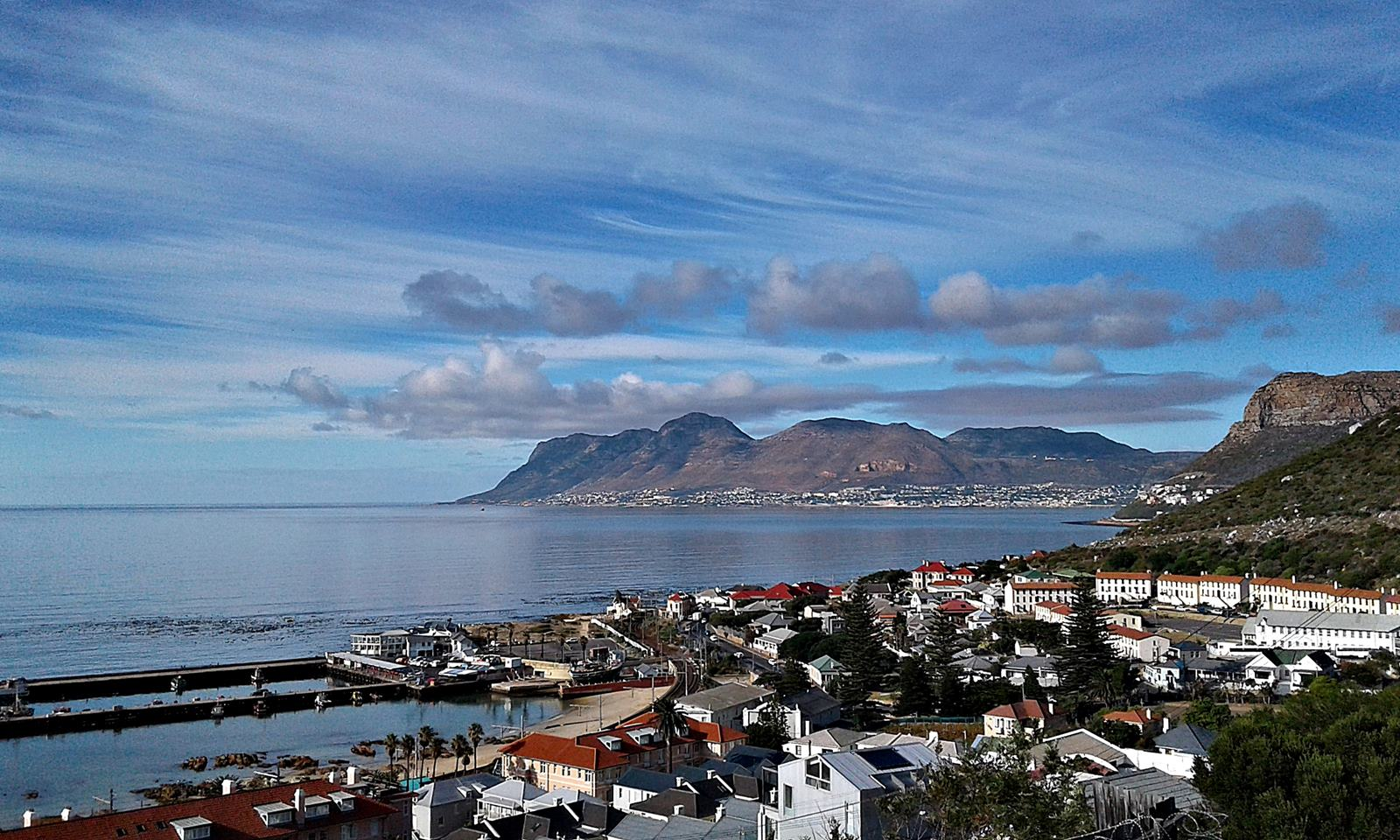
Looking down over Kalk Bay village and harbour from Boyes Drive

The Bible Institute of South Africa is an evangelical Bible college located on the False Bay coastline in Kalk Bay, Cape Town in South Africa. The college has students from across Africa, as well as from Europe, Asia and North America.

BISA is a non-denominational Bible training college. Staff and students are drawn from a range of church affiliations in SA and internationally, rather than one single denomination, as would be expected in a Seminary. The method and content of study is Christocentric and employs a historic Protestant and Reformational hermeneutic in the interpretation of the Bible. The teaching ethos is two-fold, not only to impart knowledge, but to take that knowledge and use it in the development of the skills and character needed by the student to be effective in life and service.

The outcome for each student is to be able to think rationally, clearly and critically about life issues in a way that is biblical and sustainable in a context of serving others in multi-faith, multi-cultural and international communities. The college functions as a community in residence, sharing tuition, meals, assemblies and prayer times together.

Since its founding in 1923 BISA has trained over two thousand men and women in a variety of subjects including Hermeneutics, Biblical and Systematic Theology, the Doctrines of Scripture, Old and New Testament Studies, Ontology, and Hebrew & Greek Bible languages.

== History ==
In the early part of the 20th century formal theological education in South Africa was only available in the universities. In the 1920's three church leaders, the Rev. Marsh, Rev.Douglas and Rev. Dr J. R. L. Kingon FRSE, were concerned with the commitment to Bible teaching in the theological departments of the time. With this in mind they proposed to endow a theological professorship at one of the South African universities. Their intention was to create high quality academic training – at a degree level – to provide Churches in South Africa with men and women equipped to meet the challenge of a post-war world. However, due the prevailing liberal theological influence, their wish was frustrated. They subsequently moved to establish a college where the evangelical doctrines of the Bible would be taught and so in 1923 they founded the Bible Institute of South Africa. The first classes were given in Mowbray in the Cape Peninsula. Immediately prior to World War II the Institute moved to Kalk Bay, and has developed into the present campus where the B.Th. programme is accredited by the South African Council on Higher Education for contact and distance modes. 2023 marked the Bible Institute of South Africa's Centenary.

== Courses and Accreditation ==
The residential courses comprise a Bachelor of Theology, BTh (CHE accredited) plus a Bachelor of Theology (Honours), BTh(Hons) which is also CHE accredited as well as a Christian Foundations Gap-Year (not accredited). Programmes for off-campus students include a correspondence-based Distance Learning Programme - a Bachelor of Theology, BTh (CHE accredited). BISA also runs a part-time Christian Leadership Programme, the CLP (not accredited). The residential courses include weekly practical ministry experience as well as a one-week Community Outreach, held annually in March. MA in Bible Translation: In 2020, seven Bible translation practitioners from Southern Africa registered for a postgraduate course in applied Bible translation. The degree material was developed and offered by Wycliffe Bible Translators. BISA offered an interim umbrella of endorsement which was followed by accreditation by the Association for Christian Theological Education in Africa (ACTEA). In November 2022, BISA hosted the first graduation of Wycliffe students.

The BISA Winter School held annually in June/July is open to church leaders and workers and offers courses taught by international academics and researchers in their specific fields. Guest speakers have included Darrell Bock Doug Moo, Craig Blomberg, Greg Cook George H Guthrie and Bill Mounce.

The BISA Summer School includes a biennial intensive course in Biblical Counselling, presented over two weeks in January by Dr Greg Cook, visiting lecturer from Fort Worth, Texas. The course is a credit-bearing module for registered on-campus students and is open, (without credit) for informal attendance.

Classes are held on campus in the residential programme and by distance in the Distance Learning Programme. Both programmes use the Learning Management System CANVAS in addition to a specifically developed Student Information System, 'Odoo'.

In March 2020 following presidential directives due to the Covid-19 pandemic, all courses migrated to online tuition. With the subsequent changes in the SA lockdown status, courses resumed in contact and distance modes. The campus has established an 'African Recording Studio' where lecturers both record and present classes in real time for the campus residential and distance learning students.

== Principalship ==
Since its founding year 1923, the Bible Institute has appointed eleven Principals –

- Alfred Daintree (1923–38);
- Joseph Ward (1939);
- Arthur Taylor (1940–45);
- Stuart Law (1945–53);
- Sandy Gilfillan(1953-1959);
- Murdo Gordon (1960–81);
- Clive Tyler (1981-1994);
- Bryan Williams (1995-1999);
- Tom Austin (2000–04);
- Raymond Potgieter (2006–11);
- Daniel Simango (2014 - to present date)

The current Principal, Zimbabwe born Dr Daniel Simango, holds a Licentiate in Theology (LTh) from the Bible Institute of South Africa (2000), a BA in Theology (Cum Laude), a BA Honours in Theology from Potchefstroom University for Christian Higher Education (2002), and a MA in Old Testament from North West University (2006). In 2011, Daniel was awarded a PhD in Old Testament from North-West University. He lectures Old Testament and Hebrew courses to under-graduate students and supervises post-graduate students in Old Testament studies.

The college Faculty is made up of full-time and part-time lecturers from South Africa and other countries.

In 2021 The BISA Board of Directors established the Augustine Chair of Reformed Theology. This Chair is currently occupied by Mr Sizwe Maseti PhD candidate) Stellenbosch University.

The Bible Institute of South Africa partners with several Missions Agencies giving students both pre and post-graduation opportunities to work cross culturally in society.

== See also ==
- Mission Aviation Fellowship
- Mission to the World
- SIM (Christian organization)
- George H. Guthrie
- Bible translations
