= Jonathan Jansen =

South African academic leader

Jonathan David Jansen
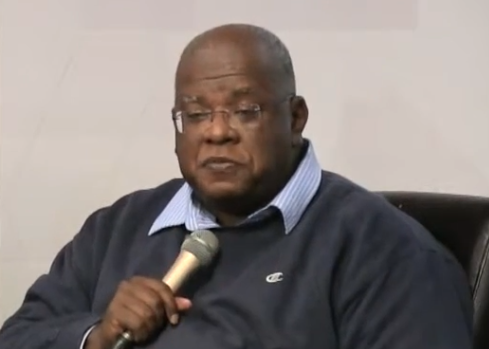
- Jansen discusses a Higher Education Fees Report at Cornerstone Institute, 2017
- Born: September 29, 1956 (age 70); Montagu, Western Cape, South Africa
- Occupation: Academic
- Known for: Former Rector of UFS

Academic background
- Education: University of the Western Cape; UNISA; Cornell University; Stanford University

Jonathan David Jansen is the former rector of the University of the Free State. He was appointed as the first coloured rector and vice-chancellor of the university in early 2009. He is a noted and frequent contributor to public discussions in South Africa on the issues of transformation and peaceful reconciliation, particularly in higher education.

== Early life and education ==
Jansen was born on 29 September 1956 in Montagu in the Western Cape region of South Africa, but grew up on the Cape Flats in the neighbourhoods of Retreat and Steenberg. He attended primary school at Sullivan Primary School, and then went to Steenberg High School. He describes himself as an average student at high school – more interested in soccer, swimming at Muizenberg and cycling with his friends. However his Latin teacher motivated him to excel in his studies and study further.

== Academic training and career ==
Jansen completed his B.Sc. (Botany and Zoology) in 1979 at the University of the Western Cape. In 1982 he received a teaching diploma and in 1984 a B.Ed. (Comparative Education) from the University of South Africa. He obtained an M.Sc. from Cornell University in 1987 and a Ph.D. ( Political Science ) from Stanford University in 1991.

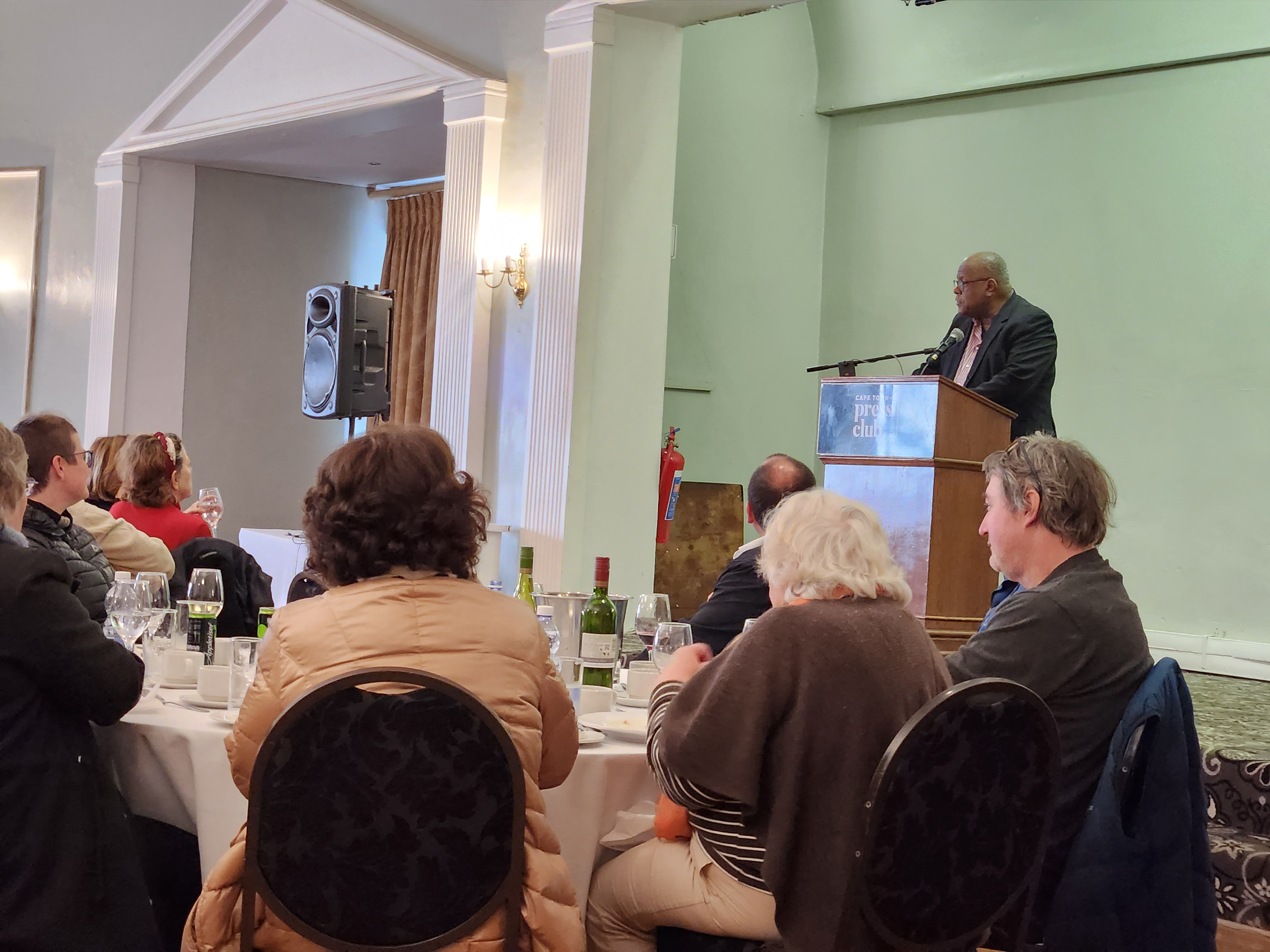
Jonathan Jansen giving a speech to the Cape Town Press Club, 2023.

Jonathan Jansen is Extraordinary Professor of Education at Stellenbosch University. He is currently the President of the Academy of Science of South Africa and a Knight-Hennessey Fellow at Stanford University. He was awarded the Division B Lifetime Achievement Award by the American Educational Research Association in 2025. He is a member of the American Academy of Arts and Sciences.
