= Oleksiy Syvak =

Ukrainian ambassador

Oleksiy Volodymyrovych Syvak
- Олексій Володимирович Сивак
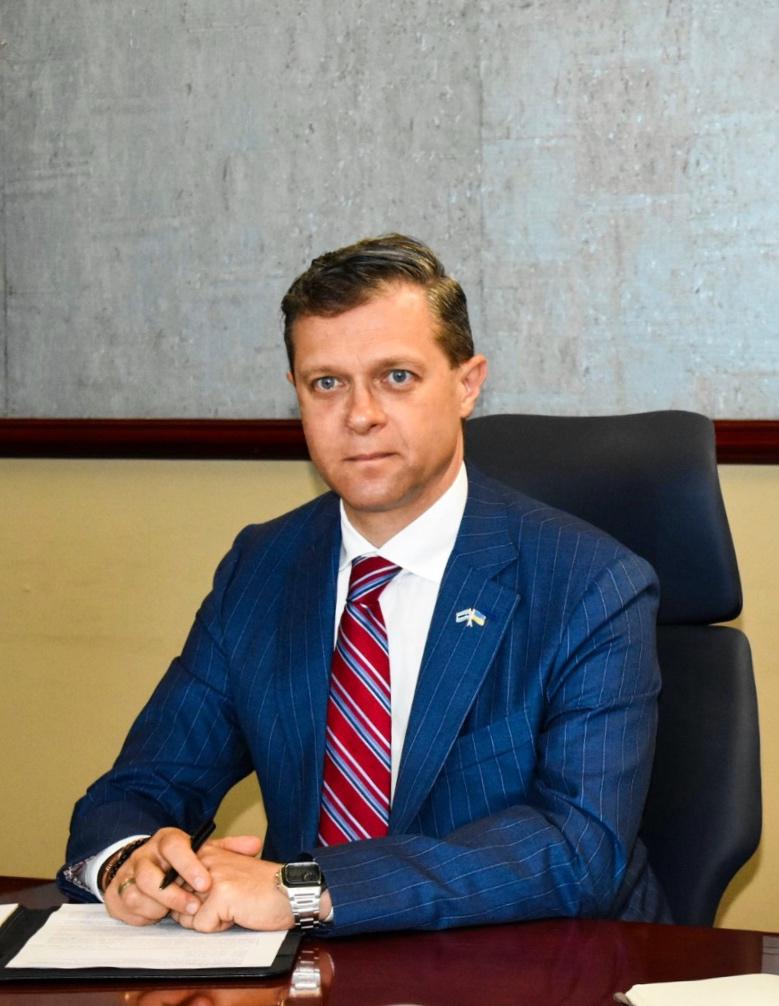

Ambassador of Ukraine to the Rebublic of Botswana
- Incumbent
- Assumed office 19 August 2024
- President: Volodymyr Zelenskyy

Personal details
- Born: 13 September 1973 (age 52) Mohyliv-Podilskyi, Vinnytsia Oblast, Ukraine
- Spouse: Oksana Syvak
- Children: 2
- Education: Taras Shevchenko National University of Kyiv, Kyiv, Ukraine; Naval Postgraduate School,Monterey, CA, USA

Oleksiy Volodymyrovych Syvak (Ukrainian: Олексій Володимирович Сивак; born 13 September 1973, Mohyliv-Podilskyi, Vinnytsia Oblast, Ukraine) is a Ukrainian public figure, advisor, and diplomat. He has served as Ambassador Extraordinary and Plenipotentiary of Ukraine to the Republic of Botswana since 19 August 2024.

== Biography ==
Syvak graduated from the Institute of International Relations of Taras Shevchenko National University of Kyiv, where he obtained bachelor's and master's degrees in International Relations and later earned a PhD in Political Science.

He subsequently received a Master of Arts degree in International Security and Civil-Military Relations from the Naval Postgraduate School in Monterey, California.

Before his appointment as Ambassador Extraordinary and Plenipotentiary of Ukraine to the Republic of Botswana, Syvak served as a Senior Consultant at the National Security and Defense Council of Ukraine. He later joined CFC Big Ideas, where he served as Government Relations Director and Partner.

By the Decree of the President of Ukraine No. 508/2024, he was appointed Ambassador Extraordinary and Plenipotentiary of Ukraine to the Republic of Botswana.

During 2022–2024, he organized the VR exhibition War Up Close, which was presented in 16 countries including the United States, the United Arab Emirates, Australia, Denmark, France, Romania, Indonesia, Moldova, Great Britain, Poland, Germany and others.

On 28 August 2025, he signed a memorandum of understanding with the University of Botswana and established Ukrainian Centre to promote academic and cultural cooperation.

On 9 March 2026, he unveiled the first monument in Africa dedicated to the Ukrainian poet and artist Taras Shevchenko at the University of Botswana.

== Personal life ==
Syvak is married to Oksana Syvak and has two children.
