= Vasyl Hamianin =

Ukrainian diplomat (b. 1971)

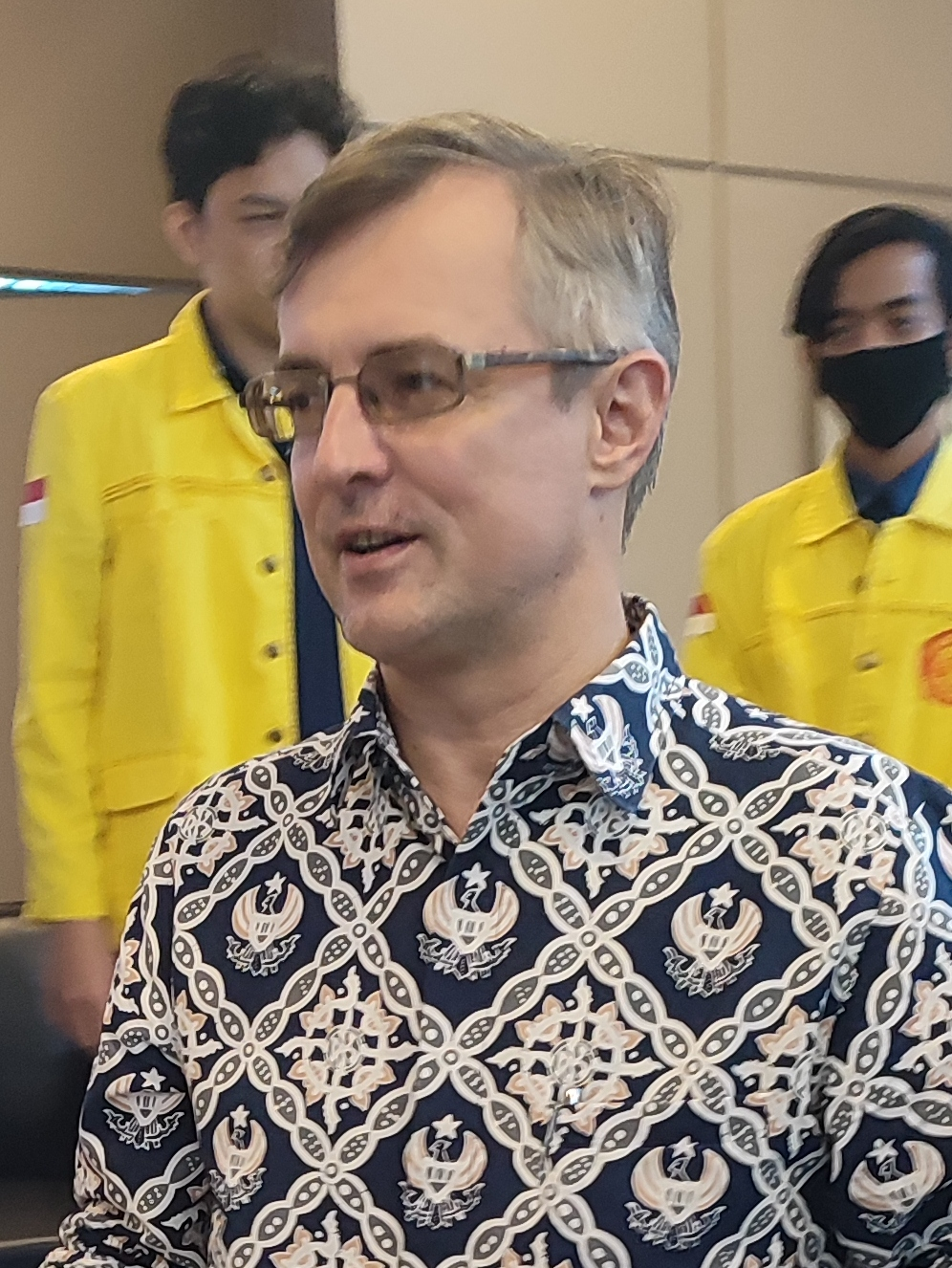
- Hamianin in 2022

Ambassador of Ukraine to the Democratic Republic of the Congo
- Incumbent
- Assumed office 10 April 2025
- President: Volodymyr Zelenskyy
- Preceded by: Sergey Mishustin (2011)

Ambassador of Ukraine to Indonesia
- In office 25 October 2021 – February 2025
- President: Volodymyr Zelenskyy
- Preceded by: Volodymyr Pakhil

Ambassador of Ukraine to the Association of Southeast Asian Nations
- In office 13 March 2023 – February 2025
- President: Volodymyr Zelenskyy
- Preceded by: Volodymyr Pakhil

Personal details
- Born: 25 December 1971 (age 54) Dnipropetrovsk, Ukrainian SSR, Soviet Union
- Education: Kyiv University; National Academy of Sciences of Ukraine

Vasyl Ivanovych Hamianin (Ukrainian: Василь Іванович Гамянін; born 25 December 1971) is a Ukrainian career diplomat, translator and sinologist. He is currently the Ukrainian Ambassador to the Democratic Republic of the Congo, serving in the position since 10 April 2025. He previously occupied a number of diplomatic positions, including as the deputy ambassador to China and ambassador to Indonesia.

== Early life and education ==
Hamianin was born on 25 December 1971 in Dnipropetrovsk, then part of the Ukrainian Soviet Socialist Republic of the Soviet Union. He studied foreign philology at the Kyiv State University (today Taras Shevchenko National University of Kyiv), graduating in 1995. He continued his education at the National Academy of Sciences of Ukraine, graduating in 2000 with a PhD thesis titled "Transformation processes in the history of modern China (1911-1949)".

== Career ==
After graduating from Kyiv State University, Hamianin worked several jobs including as a translator, public relations manager, an auditor, and a human resource manager. He began working at the National Academy of Sciences in 1999 and moved to the Ukrainian Ministry of Foreign Affairs in 2002. There, he was appointed third secretary within the directorate of Asia Pacific affairs, before he was assigned to the Ukrainian Embassy in Beijing until 2007 as a secretary.

Hamianin returned to Ukraine to work as a consultant for the Ukrainian parliament in October 2007. He returned to the Foreign Affairs Ministry in November 2010, becoming the head of its Far Eastern department. On 3 August 2011, Hamianin was appointed to the embassy in Beijing with the rank of minister-counsellor. After ambassador Yurii Kostenko was recalled on 12 September 2012, Hamianin was appointed as chargé d'affaires and held this post until 1 September 2013 when a permanent ambassador took office. He returned once more to parliamentary consultancy in 2017, advising the Rada's speaker on foreign affairs until 2019 when he once more returned to the Foreign Affairs ministry. At the ministry, he was promoted as deputy director of the 4th regional department, covering Central Asia, South Asia, East Asia, Southeast Asia, Australia, and Oceania.

=== Ambassador to Indonesia ===
On 30 July 2021, President Volodymyr Zelenskyy appointed Hamianin as Ukrainian Ambassador to Indonesia, replacing Volodymyr Pakhil who had been removed in 2020. Hamianin presented his credentials to President of Indonesia Joko Widodo on 25 October 2021. In mid-December 2021, Hamianin visited the Ukrainian community in Bali to introduce himself.

Shortly following the Russian invasion on 24 February, Hamianin appeared on virtual press conferences and on Indonesian media outlets, calling for Indonesia to condemn Russian actions. He also called for the Indonesian Islamic community to condemn the war, including with a visit to Nahdlatul Ulama chairman Yahya Cholil Staquf. In August 2022, he was warned by the Indonesian Ministry of Foreign Affairs for his tweet criticizing Indonesia's position of condemning Israeli attacks in Gaza while not condemning the Russian invasion.

Several days prior to the 2022 G20 Bali summit, on 10 November 2022 the Minister of Foreign Affairs Dmytro Kuleba signed the Treaty of Amity and Cooperation in Southeast Asia. Upon the signing of the treaty, President Zelenskyy appointed Hamianin as the temporary representative of Ukraine to the ASEAN. Hamianin presented his credentials to the Secretary General of ASEAN, Kao Kim Hourn, on 13 March 2023.

In February 2025, Hamianin announced his departure at a meeting with the Foreign Policy Community of Indonesia. His duties were taken over by Yevhenia Shynkarenko, who acted as the chargé d'affaires ad interim.

=== Ambassador to DRC ===
On 21 December 2024, President Volodymyr Zelenskyy issued a decree which appointed Hamianin as the nation's ambassador to the Democratic Republic of the Congo. Hamianin was the inaugural ambassador for the country after the Ukrainian embassy in the country began re-operating in April. He handed over his credentials to the President of the Democratic Republic of the Congo Félix Tshisekedi on 10 April 2025. Hamianin made his first public appearance on 29 April for the occasion of the World Press Freedom Day, where he drew similarities between Ukrainian and Congolese histories and outlined plans for cultural and economic exchanges.

== Personal life ==
Hamianin is married with two sons and a daughter. After the Russian invasion, his daughter Varvara Hamianin was evacuated to Indonesia along with Indonesian citizens in Ukraine.
