= Oksana Dramaretska =

Ukrainian diplomat

- Оксана Драмарецька
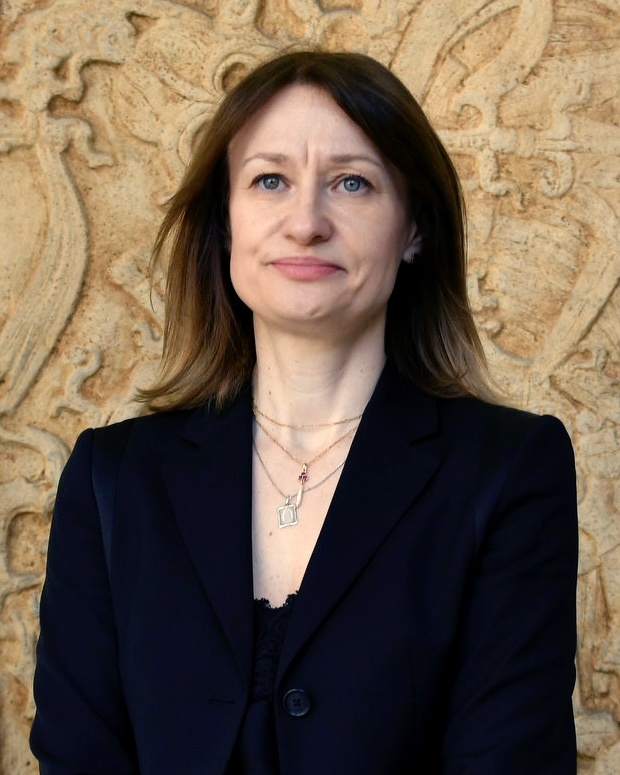
- Dramaretska in 2022

Ambassador of Ukraine to Mexico
- Incumbent
- Assumed office 12 August 2020
- Preceded by: Ruslan Spirin

Personal details
- Born: Oksana Valeriivna Dramaretska; 30 September 1971 (age 55) Bohuslav, Ukrainian SSR, Soviet Union
- Education: Taras Shevchenko National University of Kyiv; Ukrainian State University of Finance and International Trade
- Occupation: Diplomat

Oksana Valeriivna Dramaretska (Ukrainian: Оксана Валеріївна Драмарецька; born 30 September 1971) is a Ukrainian diplomat who became the ambassador to Mexico in 2020.

== Early life and education ==
Dramaretska was born in the Kyiv Oblast on 30 September 1971. She attended the Ukrainian State University of Finance and International Trade for her studies in international law and the Taras Shevchenko National University of Kyiv for her studies in Slavic studies.

== Diplomatic career ==
Dramaretska served as a diplomat since May 1995. She has held a number of roles in the Ukrainian Ministry of Foreign Affairs, the President's Administration, and the Ukrainian embassies in Bosnia and Herzegovina, Italy, and the Republic of Croatia. She was appointed the Ukrainian consul general in Barcelona from 2016 to 2020. She was named Ukraine's Extraordinary and Plenipotentiary Ambassador to Mexico on 12 August 2020.

Dramaretska has attacked senators who become members of a friendship association between Mexico and Russia, saying that endorsing Russian President Vladimir Putin amounted to "participating in a crime." On 23 March 2022, a group of parliamentarians formally founded the friendship group during a gathering that Russian Ambassador Viktor Koronelli was present at. She accepted that the majority of legislators did not attend the gathering with her Russian counterpart or join the friendship group, but those who did would have the consequences of their choice "on their conscience." In April 2022, she praised UkraineNow as a source of knowledge and education regarding the crisis.

President López Obrador faced criticism from Dramaretska for including a Russian military detachment in the Mexican Independence Day parade while Russia was still engaged in the conflict with Ukraine. On 16 September 2023, she questioned the president's commitment to neutrality and condemnation of Russian aggression, highlighting the apparent inconsistency in his actions. In response to Ukraine's criticism, the president defended the inclusion by explaining that all governments with diplomatic ties to Mexico were invited. The president emphasised the international nature of the event, noting the presence of defence secretaries from multiple countries and military representatives from around the world.

Diplomatic posts
Preceded by Ruslan Spirin	Ambassador of Ukraine to Mexico; 12 August 2020 – present	Succeeded by Incumbent
