= Pieter van Dalen =

South African politician

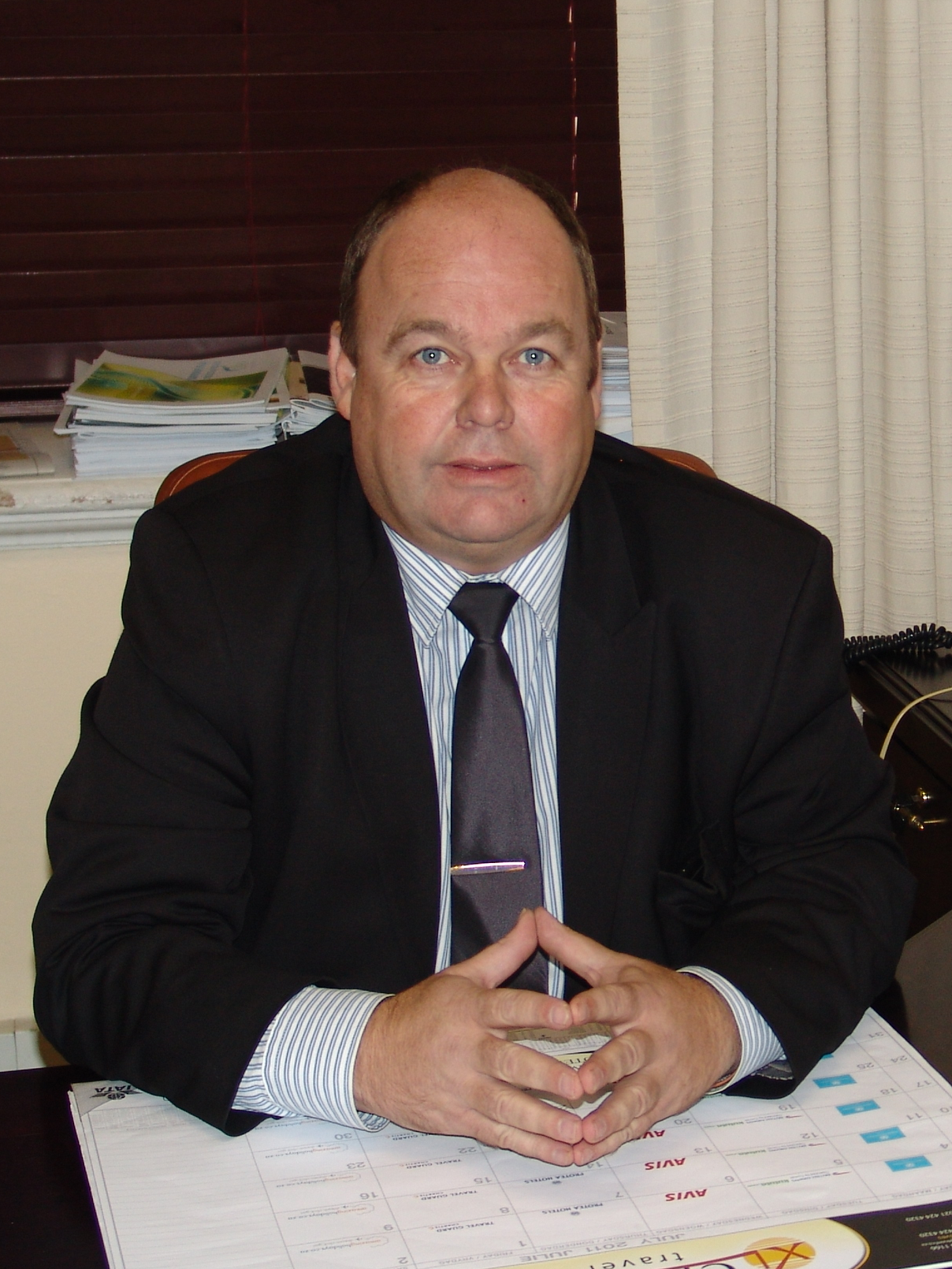

Member of the National Assembly
- In office 1 March 2015 – 7 May 2019
- In office 6 May 2009 – 6 May 2014

Deputy Shadow Minister of Agriculture, Forestry and Fisheries
- In office 24 November 2016 – 7 May 2019
- Leader: Mmusi Maimane
- Preceded by: Zelda Jongbloed

Personal details
- Born: 22 March 1966 (age 60) Cape Town, South Africa
- Party: Democratic Alliance
- Education: University of Cape Town
- Profession: Politician

Pieter van Dalen (born 22 March 1966) is a South African politician who was a member of the National Assembly of South Africa for the Democratic Alliance (DA) from 2009 to 2014, and again from 2015 to 2019.

He was the DA Deputy Shadow Minister for Agriculture, Forestry and Fisheries and the Spokesperson on Fisheries during his time parliament.

== Personal life ==
Van Dalen was born in the town of Kuils River in the Western Cape and attended De Kuilen High School.

Van Dalen studied at Wits University, and attained a NQF level 7 graduate diploma in Advanced Governance and Leadership in 2013.

Before he joined the Democratic Alliance, van Dalen was the managing director of his own company, and was also a reservist for the Fire Brigade and South African Police Service.

== Politics ==
Van Dalen was elected as a City Of Cape Town Councillor in 2006. His priority was to fight copper theft, and to that end he established and chaired the specialized Copper Theft Unit in 2007, which unit was colloquially known as "the copperheads". The endeavour was successful, reducing the City's annual financial losses due to copper theft from R22 million to under R500,000.

Van Dalen also chaired the Investment Committee of the Cape Municipal Pension Fund.

=== Parliament ===
Van Dalen exposed the Eskom/BHP Billiton secret electricity pricing deal when he revealed the Eskom dossier in 2008.

He also revealed the attempted corrupt awarding of the R800 million Department of Fisheries vessel management tender to Sekunjalo which had close relations with President Jacob Zuma. This tender was awarded to Sekunjalo by the Minister of Agriculture, Forestry and Fisheries by Minister Tina Joemat-Pettersson. After reporting it to the authorities for investigation, and after the secret PriceWaterhouseCoopers report was released by him, the contract was withdrawn and it is still the subject of a Public Protector report. On 5 December 2014, the Public Protector found her and the DAFF's conduct "improper" and constituting maladministration, and that it had led to "fruitless and wasteful expenditure". The Public Protector's recommendation to the President was to consider disciplinary action against Joemat-Pettersson.

After a 5 year term in Parliament serving on Public Enterprises and Fisheries portfolio committees as the DA Deputy Shadow Minister, in March 2015 he was returned to Parliament. He served as the Deputy Shadow Minister of Energy until December 2016. He was also the Deputy Shadow Minister of Agriculture, Forestry & Fisheries.

Prior to the 2019 general election, Van Dalen was placed 67th on the DA's national list and 17th on the party's Western Cape regional list. He was not elected to return to parliament.
