= Myroslava Shcherbatiuk =

Ukrainian diplomat

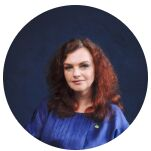

Ambassador of Ukraine to Jordan
- Incumbent
- Assumed office 18 December 2019
- President: Volodymyr Zelenskyy

Personal details
- Born: 7 December 1974 (age 51) Kyiv, Ukrainian SSR, Soviet Union
- Education: Taras Shevchenko National University of Kyiv

Myroslava Dmytrivna Shcherbatiuk (Ukrainian: Мирослава Дмитрівна Щербатюк, born 7 December 1974) is a Ukrainian diplomat. Since December 2019, she is the Ambassador Extraordinary and Plenipotentiary of Ukraine to Jordan.

== Early life and education ==
Shcherbatiuk was born in 1974 in the Kyiv. In 1996, she graduated with honors from the Faculty of Philology of Taras Shevchenko National University of Kyiv; in 1997 she graduated with honors from the Department of Oriental Studies of the Romano-Germanic Faculty of KNU.

== Career ==
From 1996 to 1999, Shcherbatiuk worked at the Embassy of Ukraine in Iran. From 1999 to 2002, she was attaché, third secretary of the Secretariat of the Minister of Foreign Affairs. Between 2002 and 2003, Shcherbatiuk worked at the Embassy of Ukraine in the United States as the third and second secretary, assistant to the Ambassador. Between 2003 and 2005, she was second, later first secretary, adviser to the group of advisers to the Minister of the Cabinet of the Minister of Foreign Affairs;

From 2005 to 2008, Shcherbatiuk was an adviser of the political section of the Embassy of Ukraine in Russia. From October 2008 to March 2010, she was an adviser-envoy on political issues of the Embassy of Ukraine in Russia. From April 2010 to March 2011, she was Director of the First Territorial Department of the Ministry of Foreign Affairs (bilateral relations between Ukraine and the Russian Federation, cooperation with the CIS).

From 2011 to 2017, Shcherbatiuk was an ambassador for special assignments in the system of the Ministry of Foreign Affairs. On 7 November 2017, she was appointed Director of the Department of the Middle East and Africa/Fifth Territorial Department of the Ministry of Foreign Affairs. On 18 December 2019, Shcherbatiuk was appointed Ambassador Extraordinary and Plenipotentiary of Ukraine to Jordan. She took the position on 22 July 2020.

== Personal life ==
Besides her native Ukrainian, Shcherbatiuk speaks English, Persian, Russian and also studies Arabic. She is married with two children.

== Awards ==
- Order of Merit (third class)
