= List of libraries in South Africa =

This is a list of libraries in South Africa.

== National Libraries in South Africa ==
- National Library of South Africa [Pretoria Campus and Capetown campus]
- South African Library for the Blind
- SAAO Library

== Legal Deposit Libraries in South Africa ==
- Adelaide Tambo Public Library
- Constitutional Court Library
- Msunduzi Municipal Library, Pietermaritzburg
- National Library of South Africa [Cape Town Campus]
- National Library of South Africa [Pretoria Campus]
- Parliamentary Information Centre
- RJR Masiea Public Library

== Academic Libraries in South Africa ==
=== Eastern Cape ===
- Nelson Mandela University Library
- Phyllis Ntantala Collaborative Library
- Rhodes University Library
- University of Fort Hare Libraries
- Walter Sisulu University Library

=== Free State ===
- Central University of Technology, Free State Libraries
- University of the Free State Libraries

=== Gauteng ===
- Sefako Makgotho Health Sciences University Library
- Tshwane University of Technology Library
- University of Johannesburg Library
- University of Pretoria Library Services
- University of South Africa (UNISA) Libraries
- University of the Witwatersrand Libraries
- Vaal University of Technology Library

=== KwaZulu-Natal ===
- Durban University of Technology Library
- Mangosuthu University of Technology Library
- University of KwaZulu-Natal Libraries
- University of Zululand Library
- University of Zululand Library (Richards Bay Campus)

=== Limpopo ===
- University of Limpopo Library
- University of Venda Library

=== Mpumalanga ===
- University of Mpumalanga Library

=== North West ===
- North-West University Library Service

=== Northern Cape ===
- Sol Plaatje University Library

=== Western Cape ===
- Cape Peninsula University of Technology Libraries
- University of Cape Town Libraries
- University of the Western Cape Library Services
- Stellenbosch University Library

== Special Libraries in South Africa ==
- Africana Library, Kimberley
- Amazwi South African Museum of Literature
- Brenthurst Library
- Cory Library for Humanities Research
- Documentation Centre for Music
- Dutch Library Cape Town
- Jacob Gitlin Library
- Killie Campbell Africana Library
- KwaZulu Natal Museum Special Library
- Margaret Smith Library
- Niven Library, Percy FitzPatrick Institute of African Ornithology, University of Cape Town
- Old Merensky Library
- University of Pretoria Special Collections
- University of Cape Town Special Collections
- Workers' Library and Museum (Note: According to the Wikipedia page for the Workers' Library and Museum, the non-profit closed in the early 2000s. The library collection is listed as being housed at Khanya College, whilst the museum is at a separate site run by the municipality.)
- Natural History Library (Iziko Museums)
- Social History Library (Iziko Museums)
- South African National Gallery Library (Iziko Museums)
- South African Broadcasting Corporation (SABC) Information Library
- Bolus Herbarium Library
- Mary Gunn Library, National Herbarium, Pretoria
- Harry Molteno Library, Kirstenbosch National Botanical Garden, Cape Town

== Library Consortia ==
- South East Academic Libraries System
- South African National Library and Information Consortium (SANLIC)
- Committee of Higher Education Libraries of South Africa (CHELSA)
- Gauteng and Environs Library Consortium (GAELIC)

== Public Libraries ==
=== Eastern Cape ===
- Adendorp Library
- Aeroville Library
- Alexandria Library
- Algoa Park Library
- Alice Public Library
- Aliwal North Library
- Allanridge Library
- Ashley Wyngaart Library
- Askeaton Public Library
- Barkly East Public Library
- Barrington Mndi Library
- Bathurst Library
- Bedford Library
- Beaconbay Library
- Berlin Library
- Bezuidenhout Library
- Bolotwa (Modular) Library
- Booysen Park Library
- Buffalo Flats Library
- Burgersdorp Public Library
- Bushmans Library
- Butterworth Library
- Cala Public Library
- Cathcart Library
- Cedarville Library
- Chatty Public Library
- Chris Hani Library
- Clarkebury (Modular) Library
- Clarkbury Public Library
- Clarkson Library
- Cofimvaba Public Library
- Colchester Public Library
- Despatch Public Library
- Dordrecht Public Library
- Dr I. K. Mabindisa Library
- Dr Ngciphe Library
- Dudumeni Library
- Duna Library
- Dutyini (Modular) Library
- Dutywa Public Library
- East London Central Library
- Elliot Public Library
- Elliotdale Public Library
- Elukhanyisweni Public Library
- Elunyaweni Library
- Engcobo Library
- Enoch Mgijima Library
- Eureka Public Library
- Fingo Library
- Flagstaff Library
- Fort Beaufort Library
- Gelvandale Library
- Greenfields Library
- Hamburg Public Library
- Hankey North Library
- Hankey South Library
- Herschel Public Library
- Hillside Public Library
- Humansdorp Library
- Indwe Public Library
- Jamestown Public Library
- Jeffreys Bay Library
- Kei Mouth Public Library
- Kei Road Public Library
- Kidds Beach Library
- King Williams Town Library
- Komga Public Library
- Kruisfontein Library
- Kubengu Public Library
- Kuyga Public Library
- Kwadwesi Public Library
- Kwamagxaki Public Library
- Kwanobuhle Public Library
- Kwanonzame Public Library
- Kwantshunqe Public Library
- Kwazakhele Public Library
- Lady Grey Public Library
- Langenhoven Public Library
- Lower Mbhangcolo Library
- Mabhobho Public Library
- Maclear Public Library
- Maluti Public Library
- Manzana Schoollibrary
- Martin Luther Public Library
- Masizame Public Library
- Matatiele Public Library
- Mbizana Public Library
- Mbuyiseli Nkosinkulu Library
- Mcewula Public Library
- Mdantsane Public Library
- Mgwali Public Library
- Michausdal Public Library
- Midros Public Library
- Mlungisi Public Library
- Molteno Public Library
- Mount Ayliff Public Library
- Mount Flecther Public Library
- Mlungisi Public Library
- Msukeni Public Library
- Mvenyane Public Library
- Mzamomhle Public LibraryMzamomhle Publicity Library]]
- Newtown Public Library
- Ngwekazi Public Library
- Nomaka Mbeki High School Library
- Nqabara Public Library
- Ntabankulu Public Library
- Orange Grove Library
- Patensie Library
- Peddie Public Library
- Rossouw Public Library
- Queenstown Public Library
- Sewendelaan Library
- Schornville Library
- Seymour Public Library
- Sobantu Public Library
- Sterkspruit Public Library
- Steynsburg Public Library
- Stormsriver Public River
- Stutterheim Public Library
- Tarkastad Public Library
- Thornham Public Library
- Thornhill Library
- Tony Mgweje Public Library
- Tsembeyi Public Library
- Tsitsana Public Library
- Tsitsikamma Public Library
- Venterstad Public Library
- Vincent Library
- Ukhanyiso Library
- W. M. Tsotsi Public Library
- West Bank Library
- Weston Library
- Whittlesea Public Library
- Willowvale Public Library

=== Free State ===
- Adelaide Tambo Library
- Albert Nzula Public Library
- Allanridge Public Library
- Arlington Public Library
- Bainsvlei Public Library
- Bakenpark Public Library
- Bethlehem Public Library
- Bethulie Public Library
- Bloemfontein City Library
- Borwa Public Library
- Bohlokong Public Library
- Boshof Public Library
- Botshabelo Public Library
- Bothaville Public Library
- Brandfort Public Library
- Brentpark Public Library
- Bronville Public Library
- B P Leinaeng
- Bultfontein Public library
- Clarens Public Library
- Clocolan Public Library
- Cornelia Public Library
- Dealesville Public Library
- Deneysville Public Library
- Dewetsdorp Public Library
- Diqhobong School/Community Library
- Ditlhake Public Library
- Edenburg Public Library
- Edenville Public Library
- Excelsior Public Library
- Ezenzeleni Public Library
- Fateng-tse-Ntsho Public Library
- Fauna Primary School/Community Library
- Fauresmith Public Library
- Fichadtpark Public Library
- Ficksburg Public Library
- Frankfort Public Library
- Fouriesburg Public Library
- Gariepdam Public Library
- Harrismith Public Library
- Heilbron Public Library
- Hennenman Public Library
- Hertzogville Public library
- Hlohlolwane Public Library
- Hoopstad Public Library
- Hydro Parh Public Library
- Ithuteng Public Library
- Intabazwe Public Library
- Itumeleng Public Library
- Jacobsdal Public Library
- Jagersfontein Public Library
- Kestell Public Library
- Kgotsong public Library
- Koffiefontein Public Library
- Koppies Public Library
- Kroonstad Public Library
- Kutlwanong Public Library
- Kwakwatsi Public Library
- Ladybrand Public Library
- Lephoi Public Library
- Leratswana Public Library
- Lindley Public Library
- Lourier Park Community Library
- Luckhoff Public Library
- Mamafubedu Public Library
- Mahlatswetsa Public Library
- Majwemasweu Public Library
- Makeleketla Public Library
- Mangaung Public Library
- Manyatseng Public Library
- Marquard Public Library
- Mashaeng Public Library
- Masilo Public Library
- Matlakeng Public Library
- Matlwangtwang Public Library
- Matwabeng Public Library
- Mautse School/Community Library
- Meloding Public Library
- Memel Public Library
- Meqheleng Public Library
- Metsi-Matsho School/Community Library
- Mmamahabane Public Library
- Moemaneng Public Library
- Mohato School/Community Library
- Monyakeng Public Library
- Morojaneng Public Library
- Mosiua Lekota School/Community Library
- Namahadi Public Library
- Nkhobiso School/Community Library
- Ntemoseng School/Community Library
- Ntha Public Library
- Nyakallong Public Library
- Odendaalsrus Public Library
- Oppermansgronde Public Library
- Oranjeville Public Library
- Parys Public Library
- Petrus Steyn Public Library
- Petrusburg Public Library
- Petsana Public Library
- Phahameng Public Library
- Philippolis Public Library
- Phiritona Public Library
- Qalabotjha Public Library
- Rammulotsi Public Library
- Ratang Public Library
- Reddersburg Public Library
- Refengkgotso Public Library
- Reitz Public Library
- Riebeeckstad Public Library
- RJR Masiea Public Library
- Rosendal Public Library
- Rouxville Public Library
- Sandersville Public Library
- Sasolburg Public Library
- Sedibeng Public Library
- Selosesha Public Library
- Schonkenville Public Library
- Smithfield Public Library
- Soutpan Public Library
- Springfield Public Library
- Steynsrus Public Library
- Thaba Patchoa Public Library
- Thabong Public Library
- Thabong 2 Public Library
- Thembalihle Public Library
- Theunissen Public Library
- Thutong Public Library
- Tikwana Public Library
- Trevor Barlow Public Library
- Trompsburg Public Library
- Tshiame Public Library
- Tsholo School/Community Library
- Tswelopele Public Library
- Tweeling Public Library
- Van Stadensrus Public Library
- Ventersdorp Public Library
- Verkeerdevlei Public Library
- Viljoenskroon Public Library
- Villiers Public Library
- Virginia Public Library
- Vooruitsig Public Library
- Vrede Public Library
- Vredefort Public Library
- Vredeshoop Public Library
- Warden Public Library
- Welkom Public Library
- Wepener Public Library
- Wesselsbron Public Library
- Winburg Public Library
- Yakhisizwe School/Community Library
- Zamdela Public Library Public
- Zastron Public Library

=== Gauteng ===
- Akasia Community Library
- Alberton Public Library
- Alexandra 3rd Ave Public Library
- Alexandra 8th Ave Library
- Alkantrant Library
- Atteridgeville Library
- Bajabulile Library
- Bakerton Library
- Brakpan Library
- Benoni Library
- Bedfordview Library
- Birchleigh Library
- Bibliographic Services
- Blackheath Library
- Bodibeng Library
- Boksburg Library
- Boskruin Library
- Bosmont Public Library
- Bonaero Park Library
- Bramfischerville Library
- Birchleigh Library
- Brixton Public Library
- Brooklyn Library
- Bryanston Public Library
- Centurion Library
- Cullinan Library
- Corronationville Library
- Cosmo City Library
- Dalene Laing Library
- Danville Library
- Davidsonville Library
- De Deur Library
- Diepkloof Zone 1 Library
- Diepkloof Zone 5 Library
- Diepsloot Library
- Dinwiddie Library
- Dreizik Library
- Dobsonville Library
- Duduza Library
- Dunnottar Library
- Coronationville Public Library
- Cosmo City Library
- East Lynne Library
- East: Regional Office Library
- Edenvale Library
- Edenpark Library
- Eersterus Library
- Eldorado Park Ext. 2 Library
- Eldorado Park Ext. 5 Library
- Eldoraigne Library
- Elsburg Library
- Emmarentia Public Library
- Emndeni Library
- Ennerdale Ext 1 Library
- Ennerdale Ext 9 Library
- Erasmia Library
- Es'kia Mphahlele Library
- Evaton Public Library
- Freedom Park Library
- GDE Education Library
- Ga-Rankuwa Library
- Gatang Library
- Geluksdal Library
- Germiston Library
- Glenanda Library
- Glenstatia Library
- Florida Public Library
- Halala Library
- Halfway House Library
- Hammanskraal Library
- Hercules Library
- Henley-On-Klip Library
- Heidelberg Library
- Hillbrow Public Library
- Horizon View Library
- HP Mokoka Library
- Impumelelo Library
- Irene Library
- Isaac Mokoena Library
- Ivory Park Library
- Ivory Park North Library
- Jameson Park Library
- Jabavu Library
- JCL African Studies
- JCL Art Gallery
- JCL Children's Book Collection
- JCL Multimedia Library
- Johannesburg City Library
- Johannesburg Art Gallery
- Johannesburg Museum Africa
- JHB Hector Peterson Library
- JCL Performing Arts
- Jotello F Soga Library
- Katlehong Library
- Kempton Park Library
- Killarney Library
- Klipfontein View Library
- Klipspruit Children's Library
- Klipspruit West Library
- Kopanong Library
- Langaville Library
- Lawrence Bongani Sibanyoni Library (Kingsway)
- Laudium Library
- Lehae Library
- Lakeside public Library
- Lenasia Ext. 3 Library
- Lenasia South Library
- Leratong Container Library
- Leondale Library
- Linbro Park Library
- Linden Library
- Lytellton Library
- Mabopane Library
- Mahlasedi Masana Library
- Malvern Public Library
- Mamelodi West Library
- Mayfair Library
- Mayville Library
- Meadowlands Library
- Meyerton main Library
- Melville Public Library
- Mofolo Library
- Moot Library
- Motubatse Library
- Mountain View Library
- Mpho Rahab Molepo Library (Tsakani II)
- Murray Park Library
- Nellmapius Library
- Newlands Library
- NORTH Regional Office
- Noordgesig Library
- Norscot Manor Library
- Norwood Public Library
- Nigel LIbrary
- Olivedale Library
- Olifantsfontein Library
- Olivenhoutbosch Library
- Onverwacht Library
- Orange Farm Library
- Orange Grove Reference Library
- Orlando East Public Library
- Palm Ridge Library
- Phomolong Library
- Prison JHB Maximum
- Protea Glen Library
- Overkruin Library
- Parkhurst Public Library
- Parkview Library
- Pennyville Container Library
- Phiri Library
- Pierre van Ryneveld Library
- Pimville Public Library
- Poortjie Library
- Protea North Library
- Primrose Library
- Prison Leeukop Medium B Library
- Protea North Library
- Protea Glen Library
- Rabie Ridge Library
- Randburg Public Library
- Randvaal Library
- Refilwe Library
- Reiger Park Library
- Rev JM Buthane Library
- Rhodes Park Library
- Riverlea Library
- River Park Library
- Rivonia Library
- R Mphephu Library
- Roodepoort Library
- Rooihuiskraal Library
- Rosa Parks Library (closed)
- Rosebank Public Library
- Rosettenville Library
- Sagewood School Library
- Sandringham Library
- Sandton Public Library
- Sandown Public Library
- Satelitte Services Libraries
- SAT Bram Fischerville
- SAT Chris Hani Hos
- SAT Alexan Kopano
- SAT Leratong
- SAT Slovoville
- Saulsville Library
- Sandringham Library
- Savoy Library
- Sharpeville Library
- Silverton Library
- Sicelo Library
- Slovoville Library
- Soshanguve Library
- Soncini-Watville Library
- Southdale Library
- South Hills Library
- Stanza Bopape Library
- Steve Bikoville Library
- Strubensvalley Library
- Suurman Library
- Temba Library
- Thembisa West Library
- Tsakane Library
- Tshepisong Library
- Tshiawelo Library
- Valhalla Library
- Vanderbijlpark Public Library
- Vlakfontein Library
- VT Sefora Library
- Vosloorus Library (Closed for refurbishment)
- Waverley Library
- Weltevredenpark Public Library
- Westbury Public Library
- West Park Library
- Wilro Park Library
- Winnie Mandela Library
- Winterveld Library
- Witpoortjie Library
- Yeoville Public Library
- Zonkizizwe Library

=== KwaZulu-Natal ===
- Adams Mission Public Library
- Albersville Library
- Austerville Library
- Asherville Public Library
- Amanzimtoti Public Library
- Athlone Park Public Library
- Ballito Public Library
- Beach Library
- Bergville Public Library
- Bluff Public Library
- Brakenham Public Library
- Bayview Library
- Caneside Library
- Canelands Public Library
- Cato Crest Public Library
- Cato Ridge Library
- Central Lending Library
- Central Don Africana Library
- Chatsworth Public Library
- Chesterville Public Library
- Chesterville Ext Public Library
- Cragieburn Library
- Croftdene Public Library
- Dassenhoek Public Library
- Departmental Libraries
- Donny Dalton Modular Library
- Dukuduku Library
- Durban City Library
- Durban North Library
- Dundee Public Library
- Gigindlovu Public Library
- Empangeni Public Library
- Emondlo Public Library
- Eshowe Public Library
- Esikhaleni Public Library
- Enseleni Public Library
- Estcourt Public Library
- Fairleigh Public Library
- Firwood Road Library
- Gamalakhe Public Library
- Galleria Mall Library
- Glenashley Public Library
- Grosvenor Public Library
- Hambanathi Library
- Harding Public Library
- Havenside
- Hibberdene Public Library
- Hillary Public Library
- Hillcrest Public Library
- Hopewell Public Library
- Housebound Services Library
- Inanda-Ohlanga Public Library
- Isipingo Beaxch Library
- Isipingo Civic Library
- Isithebe Public Modular Library
- Izingolweni Library
- Kokstad Public Library
- King Dinizulu Public Library
- Kingsburgh Public Library
- Kranskop Public Library
- Klaarwater Public Library
- Kloof Library
- KwaDabeka Library
- KwaMakhutha Public Library
- Kwakhetha Modular Library
- Kwamashu Public Library
- Kwankosi Khumalo Modular Library
- Kwanzimakwe Modular Library
- Lamontville Public Library
- La Lucia Public Library
- Mbongolowane Public Library
- Madadeni Public Library
- Mandeni Public Library
- Marburg Library
- Margate Public Library
- Marriannridge Library
- Merebank Library
- Montlands Library
- Montclair Public Library
- Moorton Library
- Motala Heights Library
- Mfekayo Modular Library
- Mpembeni Modular Library
- Mpumalanga Library
- Mpola Library
- Montclair Public Library
- Montford Library
- Mtunzini Library
- Musgrave Public Library
- Ndulinde Public Library
- Newcastle Public Library
- Nibela Modular Library
- Nirvana Hills Library
- New Germany Library
- Newlands East Public Library
- Newlands West Public Library
- Ntuzuma Public Library
- Ntunjambili Modular Library
- Nkandla Public Library
- NKungumathe Public Library
- Nongoma Public Library
- Ndwedwe Public Library
- Ntuzuma Public Library
- Osizweni Public Library
- Pinetown Library
- Port Edward Library
- Port Shepstone Public Library
- Prince Edward Library
- Qashana Khuzwayo Library
- Qhudeni public Library
- Reservoir Hills Library
- Richards Bay Public Library
- Richmond Public Library
- Sazi Nelson Library
- Shallcross Library
- Shastri Park Library
- Shayamoya Library
- Sparks Estate Public Library
- Sundumbili Public Library
- Sunnydale Public Library
- Southport Library
- St Wendolins Library
- Stanmore Public Library
- Stonebridge Public Library
- Sterkstroom Public Library
- Tanga School Library
- Tongaat Beach Library
- Tongaat Central Library
- Tongaat South Library
- Tholuwazi-Besters Library
- Thornwood Library
- Trenance Park Library
- Tsomo Public Library
- Tshelimnyama Library
- Ugie Public Library
- Umbilo Public Library
- Umbumbulu Public Library
- Umdloti Beach Public Library
- Umlazi Public Library
- Umlazi AA Public Library
- Umlazi-W Library
- Umnini Public Library
- Umhlanga Public Library
- Umhloti Beach Library
- Umtentweni Library
- Umkomaas Public library
- Umkhumbane-Wiggins Library
- Uvongo Library
- Venterstad Public Library
- Verulam Public Library
- Vryheid Town Library
- Waterfall Library
- Westville Library
- Westville North Library
- Wentworth Public Library
- Whetstone Library
- Windermere Library
- Wyebank Library

=== Limpopo ===
- Aganang Municipal Library
- Alldays Public Library
- Ba-Phalaborwa Public Library
- Babirwa Public Library
- Bakgoma Library
- Bela-Bela Public Library (Main branch)
- Bela-Bela Public Library
- Blouberg Municipality Library
- Burgersfort Public Library
- Capricorn District Library
- Drakensig Public Library
- Fetakgomo Library
- Ga-Phaahla Community Library
- Giyani Public Library
- Gravelotte Public Library
- Haenertsburg Public Library
- Hoedspruit Public Library
- Jane Furse Library
- Kgapane Public Library
- Leboneng Library
- Lebowakgomo Library
- Lephalale Public Library
- Letsitele Library
- Makhado Public Library
- Makhuva MPCC library
- Mankweng Public Library
- Mapodile Library
- Marapong Library
- Marble-Hall Public Library
- Maruleng library
- Metz Library
- Modimolle Public Library
- Modjadjieskloof Library
- Mogwadi Library
- Mokopane Public Library
- Moletji Library
- Polokwane Library
- Seleteng Library
- Senwabarwana Library
- Rapotokwane Community Library
- Saselamani Public Library
- Thulamela Public library
- Tzaneen District Library
- Xihlovo Library

=== Mpumalanga ===
- Amsterdam Library
- Chrissiemeer Library
- Emthonjeni Library
- Glenmore Public library
- Klipfontein Library
- Kriel Library
- Libangeni Library
- Low's Creek Library
- Lydenburg Library
- Marapyane Library
- Matsamo Public Library
- Middleburg Library
- Mombela Regional Library
- Nelspruit Library
- Ogies Library
- Sabie Library
- Secunda Library
- Shatale Library
- Steve Tshwete Library
- Syabuswa Library
- Kabokweni Library
- Msogwaba Library
- Zwelitsha Public Library

=== Public Libraries in Northern Cape ===
- Calvinia Public Library
- Kakamas Public Library
- De Aar Public Library
- Garies Public Library
- Alexanderbaai Library
- Judy Scott Library
- Barkly West Library
- Bendell Library
- Black Rock Library
- Hotazel Library
- Kimberley Library
- Galeshewe Library
- Hadison Park Library
- Judy Scott Library
- Ritchie Library
- Spruitview Library
- Paballelo Library
- Kenhardt Library
- Forum Library
- Keimoes Library
- Kathu Library

=== Public Libraries in North-West ===
- Amalia Library
- Brits Public Library
- Coligny Public Library
- Damonsville Library
- Glaudina Library
- H C Bosman Library
- Hartbeespoortdam Public Library
- Hebron Library
- Ikageng Library
- Ipelegeng Library
- Ipeleng Library
- Jericho Library
- Kamogelo Dual Purpose Library
- Kanonnierspark Library
- Kosmos Library
- Koster Public Library
- Legkraal Library
- Lehurutshe Library
- Lethabong Library
- Letlhabile Library
- Lucas Modise Dual Purpose Library
- Mabeskraal Library
- Marikana Library
- Matlwang Dual Purpose Library
- Mogopa Dual Purpose Library
- Mogwase Library
- Mohadin Library
- Motaung Dual Purpose Library
- Mothotlung Library
- Mphebatho Library
- Oukasie Library
- Papi Ntjana Library
- Phokeng Library
- Potchefstroom Library
- Promosa Library
- Reagile Library
- Rustenburg Public Library
- Schwezer-Reneke
- Supingstad Library
- Swartruggens Library
- Tlokweng Library
- Touvlug Dual Purpose Library
- Tshing Library
- Ventersdorp Library
- Zeerust Library

=== Public Libraries in the Western Cape ===
- Adriaanse Public Library
- Archbishop Desmond Tutu Library (Swellendam)
- Athlone Public Library
- Avondale Public Library
- Avontuur Public Library
- Beaufort West Public Library
- Belhar Public Library
- Bellville Public Library
- Bellville South Public Library
- Bergendal Satellite Library
- Bishop Lavis Public Library
- Bloubergstrand Public Library
- Bonteheuwel Public Library
- Bothasig Public Library
- Brackenfell Public Library
- Bridgetown Public Library
- Bridgetown Public Library
- Brooklyn Public Library
- Browns Farm Public Library
- Buisplaas Public Library, Mossel Bay
- Camps Bay Public Library
- Central Library Cape Town
- CJ Langehoven Public Library
- Claremont Public Library
- Colin Eglin Sea Point Public Library
- Crossroads Public Library
- Delft Public Library
- Delft South Public Library
- Dunoon Public Library
- Durbanville Public Library
- Dysseldorp Public Library
- Edgemead Public Library
- Eerste River Public Library
- Eikendal Public Library
- Ellen Van Rensburg Public Library, Mossel Bay
- Elsies River Public Library
- Fair View Mini Library
- Fisantekraal Public Library
- Fish Hoek Public Library
- Goodwood Public Library
- Gordon's Bay Public Library
- Gouritsmond Public Library
- Grabouw Public Library
- Grassy Park Public Library
- Gugulethu Public Library
- Hangberg Public Library
- Hanover Park Public Library
- Harare Public Library
- Heidelberg Public Library
- Heideveld Public Library
- Hout Bay Public Library
- Huguenot Square Public Library
- Kensington Public Library
- King Williams Town Library
- Khayelitsha Public Library
- Klapmuts Public Library
- Kloof Street Public Library
- Koeberg Public Library
- Kommetjie Public Library
- Kraaifontein Public Library
- Kuils River Public Library
- Kulani Public Library
- Kuyasa Public Library
- Langa Public Library
- Lansdowne Public Library
- Lentegeur Library
- Manenberg Public Library
- Masiphumelele Library
- Meadowridge Library
- Mitchells Plain Town Centre Library
- Mowbray Public Library
- Muizenberg Public Library
- Observatory Public Library
- PD Paulse Memorial Library
- Philippi East Library
- Rocklands Library
- Rondebosch Library
- Simon's Town Library
- Strandfontein Library
- Tafelsig Library
- Tokai Public Library
- Vanwyksdorp Library
- Weltevreden Library
- Westridge Library
- Wynberg Public Library

== School libraries ==
- Brettonwood High School Media Centre
- Clairwood High School Library
- Lawson Brown High School Library
- Lamontville High School Library
- Rossburgh High School Library
- Parktown High School for Girls Library
- Westridge High School Library

== See also ==
- History of libraries in South Africa
- Molteno Regulations
- Library consortia in South Africa
- Library associations in South Africa
  - Library and Information Association of South Africa
- South African Library Week
- Copyright law of South Africa
- List of archives in South Africa
- List of museums in South Africa
- Mass media in South Africa
- Open access in South Africa
