= Open access in South Africa =

Open access to scholarly communication in South Africa occurs online via journals, repositories, and a variety of other tools and platforms. Compared to other African nations, open access in South Africa has grown quickly in recent years.

According to UNESCO, South Africa is a leading African country in terms of open access policies on the governmental level and grass-roots initiatives in universities and research organizations. South African signatories to the international "Open Access 2020" campaign, launched in 2016, include the South African National Library and Information Consortium (SANLiC) and University of the Witwatersrand, Johannesburg. As of January 2018, there are nine research entities with policies in the international Registry of Open Access Repository Mandates and Policies.

== Journals ==
As of April 2018, the international Directory of Open Access Journals records some 79 open access journals produced in South Africa.

== Repositories ==
As of July 2018, the Directory of Open Access Repositories lists 39 repositories in South Africa. This includes 11 traditional universities (or at least their departments), several universities of technology (Cape Peninsula University of Technology, Durban University of Technology, Central University of Technology and Tshwane University of Technology), three comprehensive universities (University of Johannesburg, University of South Africa and University of Zululand) and Council for Scientific and Industrial Research (CSIR).

== See also ==
- African Journals OnLine
- Access to information in South Africa
- Science and technology in South Africa
- List of archives in South Africa
- Open access in other countries

== Sources ==
This article incorporates text from a free content work. Licensed under CC-BY-SA IGO 3.0 (license statement/permission). Text taken from Global Open Access Portal, UNESCO. UNESCO.
