= History of libraries in South Africa =

The history of libraries in South Africa had its start with libraries formed for private use which later were made available for the general public. In 1761, the most extensive of these early private collections, owned by Joachim von Dessin, the secretary of the Orphan Chamber, was left to the Cape consistory of the Dutch Reformed Church specifically to form the basis of a public library for the advantage of the community.

The National Library of South Africa was the first library to be established in South Africa by proclamation on 20 March 1818 by Lord Charles Somerset when he stipulated that a wine tax would be levied to pay for it.

The issuing of the "Molteno Regulations", in the Cape Colony in 1874, was a turning point in the development of public libraries in southern Africa. Their provision of a pound-for-pound government grant for the establishment and maintenance of libraries - even in rural areas - led to the Cape Colony having one of the greatest concentrations of libraries anywhere in the world. Due to their simplicity and success, the regulations were adopted elsewhere in southern Africa, especially after union in 1910, and remained in force until 1955.

Major events in South African library development were the 1988 report, The Use of Libraries for the Development of South Africa. and the National Education Policy Investigation (NEPI). The NEPI report aimed to "explore policy options in all areas of education within a value framework derived from the ideals of the broad democratic movement."

== Types of libraries ==
- National and legal deposit libraries (for example the National Library of South Africa)
- Public libraries
- School libraries
- University and college libraries
- Special libraries (for example the South African National Library for the Blind in Grahamstown)
- Libraries in museums, art galleries and archives
- Professional associations

== See also ==
- Cory Library for Historical Research, Grahamstown
- List of libraries in South Africa
- National English Literary Museum, Grahamstown
