= Archival Platform =

Archival platform is a South African civil society initiative committed to deepening democracy through the use of memory and archives as dynamic public resources. The Archival Platform was established in 2009 by the Archive and Public Culture Research Initiative at the University of Cape Town and the Nelson Mandela Foundation, aiming to draw attention to the growing crisis in the national archival system. The Archival Platform is funded by The Atlantic Philanthropies. The Platform focuses on the memory, documentary record, cultural practices, artifacts, and places of the country’s history.

== Key objectives ==
- Raise public awareness of the archives' role and value;
- Provide a mechanism through which new ideas and information can be shared and debated;
- Facilitate organized, effective public engagement and public interest wherever questions of archives are involved.

The Archival Platform engages with academics from a range of disciplines, record keepers, government employees, cultural workers, heritage professionals and practitioners, memory activists and theorists, archive creators and users, public and private institutions as well as with organizations and communities.

== Activities ==
In 2014 The Archival Platform prepared analysis of South Africa`s national archives system. The analysis gives the scope of the work done through the 1990s and concludes that the national archival system is in trouble.

== See also ==
- National Archives and Records Service of South Africa
