= Shelfie =

Selfie involving a bookshelf

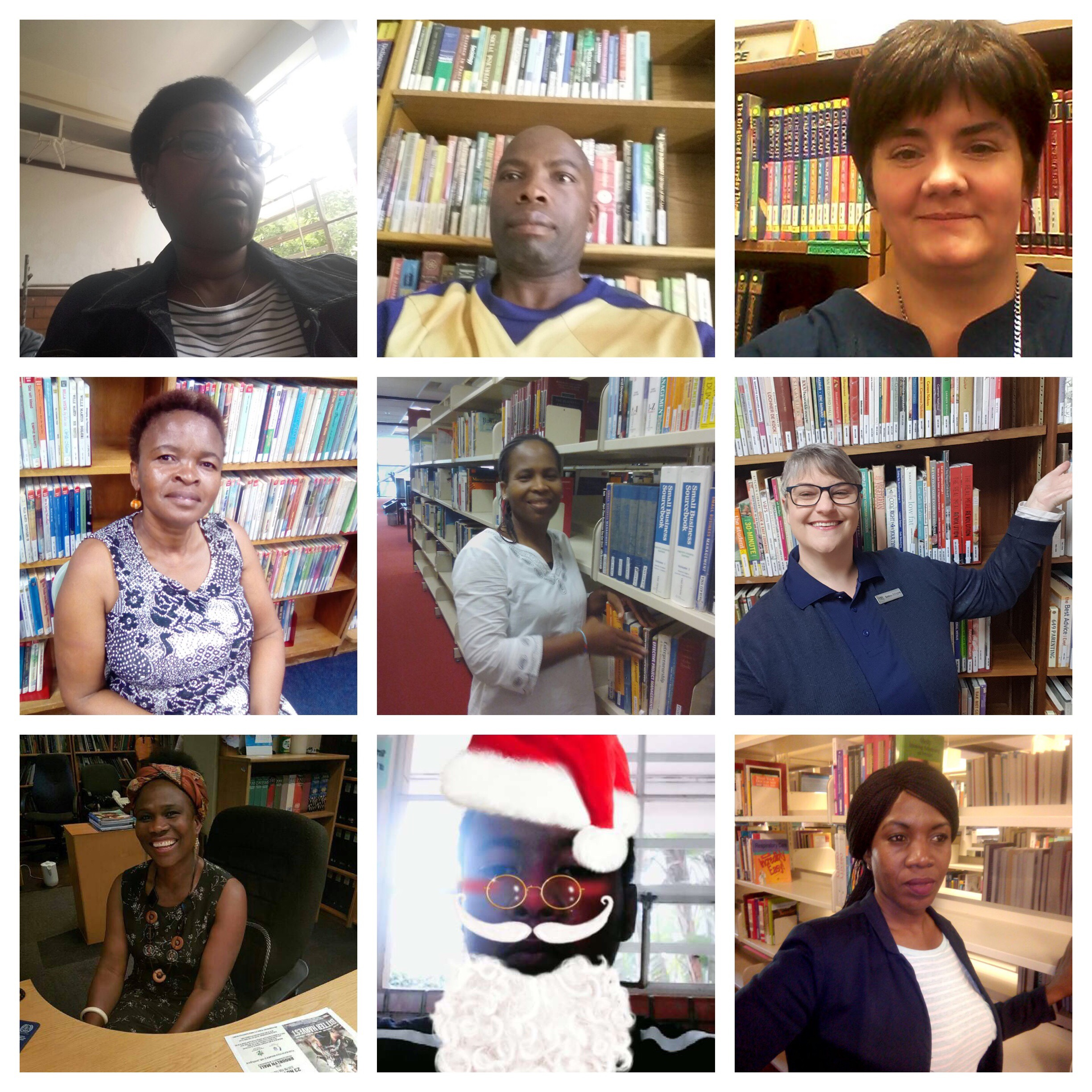
A collection of shelfies taken by COJ librarians at a mLiteracy workshop

Shelfie (portmanteau of shelf and selfie) is an English neologism, referring to a selfie in front of a bookshelf.

The term emerged in 2014, as a lighthearted alternative to the better-known "selfie". The shelfie emerged on Instagram, with the first posts by internet users who preferred to show off their taste for objects such as books, cups, flowers, mugs, pens, diaries etc., instead of their visage.

Internet users could choose to photograph and display their literary tastes through a curated collection of books. Instead of displaying ‘faces and expressions,’ and being accused of narcissism. The shelfie photo represented literary choices or tastes that the person wished to communicate on Instagram or other social media.

The idea has been popularized in library promotions and contests which award prizes for the best shelfies.
