= University of Pretoria Special Collections =

Coordinates: 25°45′18.09″S 28°13′50.27″E

University of Pretoria Special Collections is a self-contained unit in the Library Services at the University of Pretoria. The mission of the Special Collections unit is to play a stewardship role in the acquisition and preservation of the Department of Library Services’ rare and valuable information resources, making them accessible to students, staff and researchers, as well as safeguarding them for future generations.

The unit houses the following collections:

== Africana Collections ==
=== ZA Collection ===
This, the largest of the collections, contains publications concerning Africa, south of the Sahara. It covers the whole spectrum of subjects, with the emphasis on historical and heritage studies, arts, indigenous crafts, fauna and flora. The journals include entire collections of such publications as Die Huisgenoot, die Brandwag and Boerevrou. The collection is fully catalogued on the Library's online catalogue., and is continuously growing. Various donors, including staff members and alumni, contributed to the establishment and growth of the Africana collection.

Housed and labeled separately but including many Africana works, are the collections of a number of eminent persons which have been acquired since the 1920s:

=== Prof J du Plessis ===
of Stellenbosch

=== Rev L.E. Brandt and Rev van Warmeloo ===
of the Dutch Reformed Church

=== Adv J de V Roos, 1884-1940 ===
auditor-general of the Union of South Africa, 1918–1929

=== Muller and Van Belkum Collection ===
part of the library of the Nederduitsch Hervormde Kerk donated by Prof S.P Engelbrecht in 1923

=== Lutherse Seminarium ===
donated by the Holland-Zuid-Afrikaanse Unie in 1939

=== Sir J H Brand ===
President of the Orange Free State, 1864–1888

=== T.F. Burgers ===
President of Transvaal, 1872–1877

=== Pamphlet collection ===
A pamphlet collection consisting of approximately 22 000 items covering a wide range of subjects is housed at Special Collections. Some of these pamphlets date from the late 19th century and early 20th century. An in-progress finding aid for the collection is available.

=== Non-Africana ===
Non-Africana works published before 1870 are kept in the ZBR (Brandkluis) Collection. Fine examples are: Ceremonies and religious customs of various nations of the known world vols 1 & 2, published 1734, and Bibliorum Sacrorum a 17th-century religious text in Hebrew, Greek and Latin.

== Jurriaanse (JUR) Collection ==
Kept separately in its own room, is the Jurriaanse (JUR) Collection. Dr Aardt Jurriaanse, a Dutchman, studied medicine in the Netherlands and came to South Africa during the Anglo Boer War with a medical corps in aid of the Boers. He stayed on in South Africa after the war and worked as a general practitioner in the Ermelo, Mpumalanga district of the old Transvaal where he also farmed until the end of his life. His collection of books covers the classics in literature and medicine.

== UP Publications (TUK) ==
A collection of publications by the staff, research units/student bodies or any association / organization of the University of Pretoria, also forms part of Special Collections. All publications that deal with the University of Pretoria or publications that were published with financial assistance from the University of Pretoria, are also included in this collection.

Masters and Doctoral research outputs of University of Pretoria students are regarded and preserved, as special UP Publications. This collection contains a copy of each and every dissertation/thesis by Masters and Doctoral students enrolled at all the faculties at the University of Pretoria. In 2004 it became the policy of the University of Pretoria that a student must submit a bound paper copy as well as two electronic copies of the approved dissertation/thesis. Since then the electronic copy is regarded as the preservation copy.

== Netherlands Cultural History Library (KHI & KHN) Collection ==
The collection is the most extensive Dutch collection in the Southern Hemisphere and consists of approximately 40 000 books and 40 000 journals covering all disciplines. Most of the old and rare books of this collection are separated from the main collection. These books are identified with the prefix KHIN. Some of the modern works have been integrated with the general collection of the Academic Information Service, while the rest are housed in the Old Merensky Library.

== Reserved (RES) ==
Interesting items in this collection are first edition facsimiles of the Gutenberg Bible and Leonardo da Vinci's Notebooks, as well as a first edition of Copernicus's De revolutionibus orbium coelestium . This collection was home to the works that were X-rated during the Apartheid years, i.e. books censored by the government, because they were considered subversive or pornographic. It also houses "high risk" books which are placed in the collection at the request of information specialists.

== Digital Collections ==
These collections can be viewed on Upspace, the digital research repository of the University of Pretoria. They include African Heritage Collections, Historical Legal Documents and UP Publications, among others.
