= City of Johannesburg Library and Information Services =

Public library system of Johannesburg, South Africa

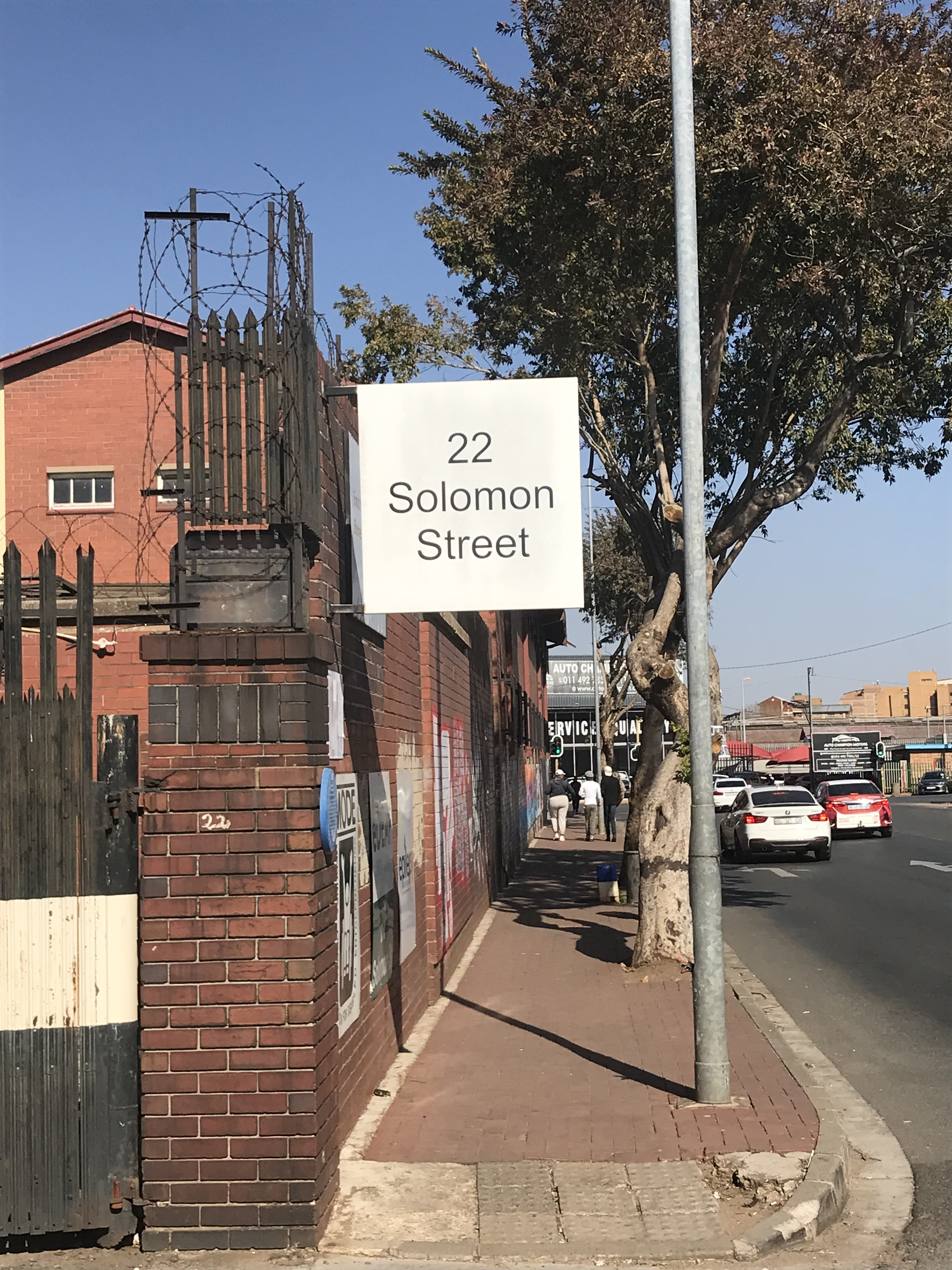
- 26°11′47″S 28°01′15″E
- Location: 22 Solomon St, Vrededorp, Johannesburg, 2001
- Established: 1890; 136 years ago

Other information
- Director: Nobuntu Mpendulo
- Website: Official website

City of Johannesburg Library and Information Services (CoJ LIS) is a public library system of the City of Johannesburg metropolitan government in Gauteng, South Africa. It manages about 90 public branch libraries across seven regions, giving access to roughly 4.9 million residents.

== History ==
After Johannesburg was founded, a volunteer library committee founded premises and appointed the city's first librarian in 1890s. In 1924, the city council took over the library and planned the Johannesburg City Library (JCL) which was opened on 6 August 1935.

The library reopened in 2012.

== Library network and list of libraries ==
- Alexandra 3rd Ave Public Library
- Alexandra 8th Ave Library
- Blackheath Library
- Boskruin Library
- Bosmont Public Library
- Bramfischerville Library
- Brixton Library
- Bryanston Library
- Coronationville Library
- Cosmo City Library
- Diepkloof Zone 1 Library
- Diepkloof Zone 5 Library
- Diepsloot Library
- Dreizik Library
- Dobsonville Library
- Eldorado Park Ext. 2 Library
- Eldorado Park Ext. 5 Library
- Emmarentia Library
- Emndeni Library
- Ennerdale Ext 1 Library
- Ennerdale Ext 9 Library
- Freedom Park Library
- Florida Library
- Glenanda Library
- Halfway House Library
- Hillbrow Library
- Horizon View Library
- Ivory Park Library
- Ivory Park North Library
- Jabavu Library
- JCL African Studies
- JCL Art Gallery
- JCL Art Library
- JCL Children's Book Collection
- JCL Lending
- JCL Multimedia Library
- JCL Performing Arts
- Johannesburg Art Gallery
- Johannesburg City Library
- Johannesburg Museum Africa
- JHB Hector Peterson Library
- Killarney Library
- Klipfontein View Library
- Klipspruit Children's Library
- Klipspruit West Library
- Lehae Library
- Lenasia Ext. 3 Library
- Lenasia South Library
- Leondale Library
- Linbro Park Library
- Linden Library
- Malvern Library
- Mamelodi West Library
- Mayfair Library
- Meadowlands Library
- Melville Public Library
- Mofolo Library
- Murray Park Library
- Newlands Library
- Noordgesig Library
- Norwood Library
- Olifantsfontein Library
- Olivedale Library
- Orange Farm Library
- Orange Grove Reference Library
- Orlando East Public Library
- Parkhurst Library
- Parkview Library
- Paterson Park Library
- Phiri Library
- Phomolong Library
- Pimville Library
- Poortjie Library
- Prison JHB Female
- Prison JHB Maximum
- Prison JHB Medium
- Prison Leeukop Medium A Library
- Prison Leeukop Medium B Library
- Prison Leeukop Maximum Library
- Prison Leeukop Youth
- Protea Glen Library
- Protea North Library
- Rabie Ridge Library
- Randburg Library
- Rhodes Park Library
- Riverlea Library
- River Park Library
- Rivonia Library
- Roodepoort Library
- Rosebank Public Library
- Rosettenville Public Library
- Sandringham Library
- Sandton Public Library
- Sandown Library
- Satellite Services Libraries
- Satellite Bram Fischerville
- Satellite Chris Hani Hos
- Satellite Alexan Kopano
- Satellite AT Leratong
- Satellite Pennyville
- Satellite Slovoville
- Sandringham Library
- Savoy Library
- Slovoville Library
- South Hills Library
- Southdale Library
- Strubensvalley Library
- Tshepisong Library
- Vanderbijlpark Public Library
- Vlakfontein Library
- Weltevredenpark Public Library
- Westbury Library
- Wilro Park Library
- Witpoortjie Library
- Yeoville Library
