= 22 Solomon Street =

Headquarters and worker compounds

Coordinates: 26.1965°S 28.0212°E

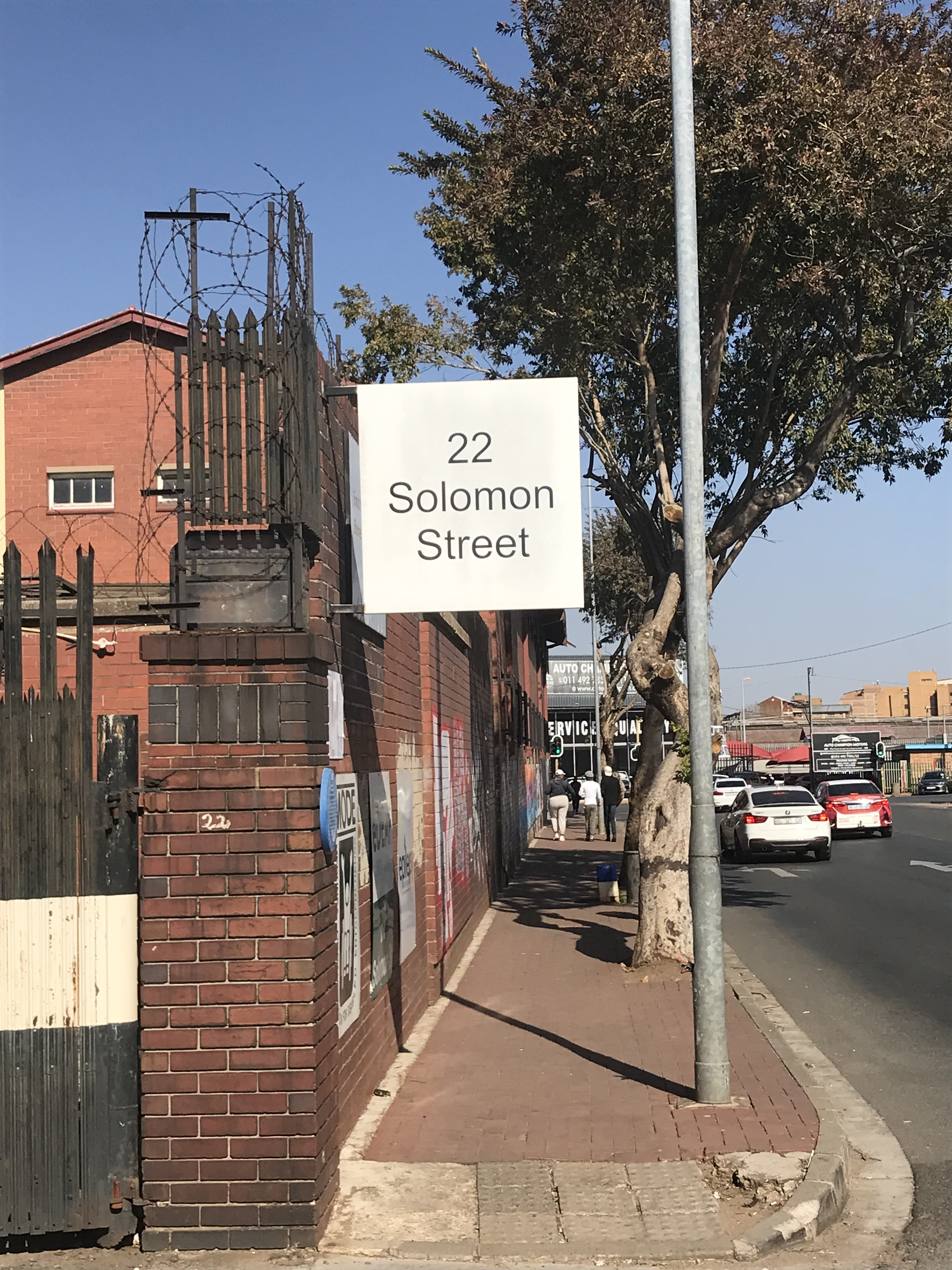
Entrance to 22 Solomon Street

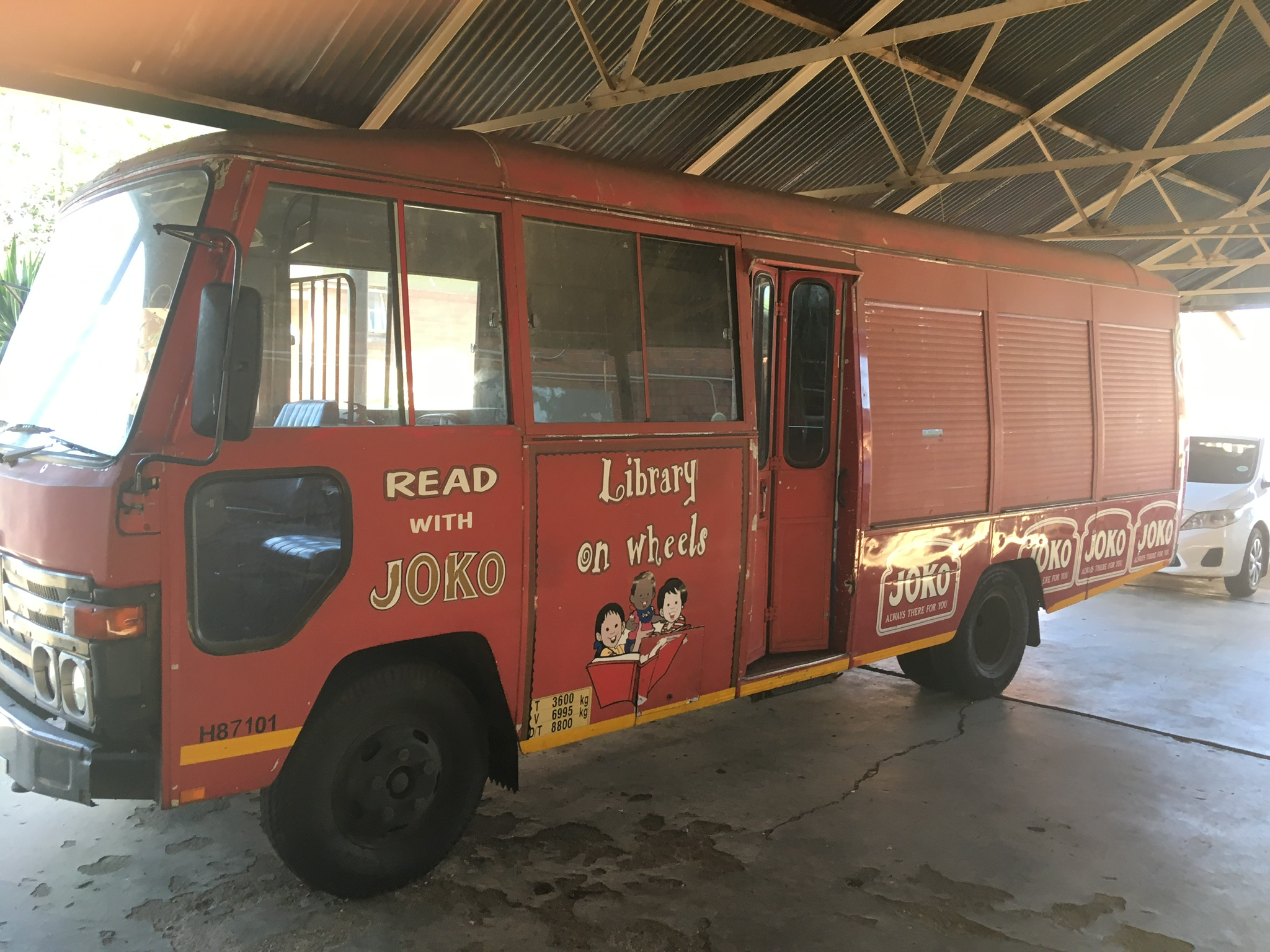
Mobile library bus (has moved)

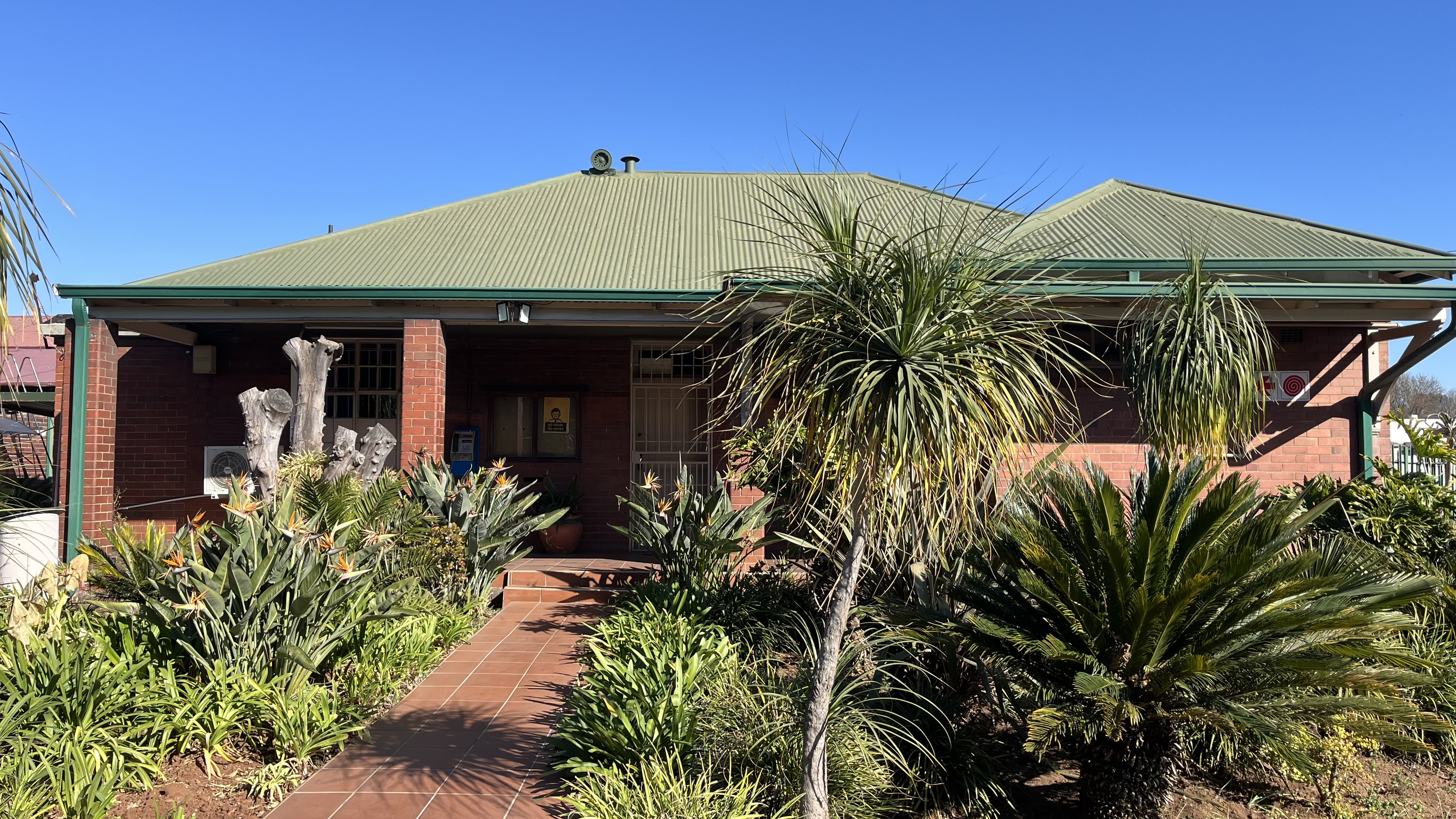
Director of LIS's office (Nobuntu Mpendulo)

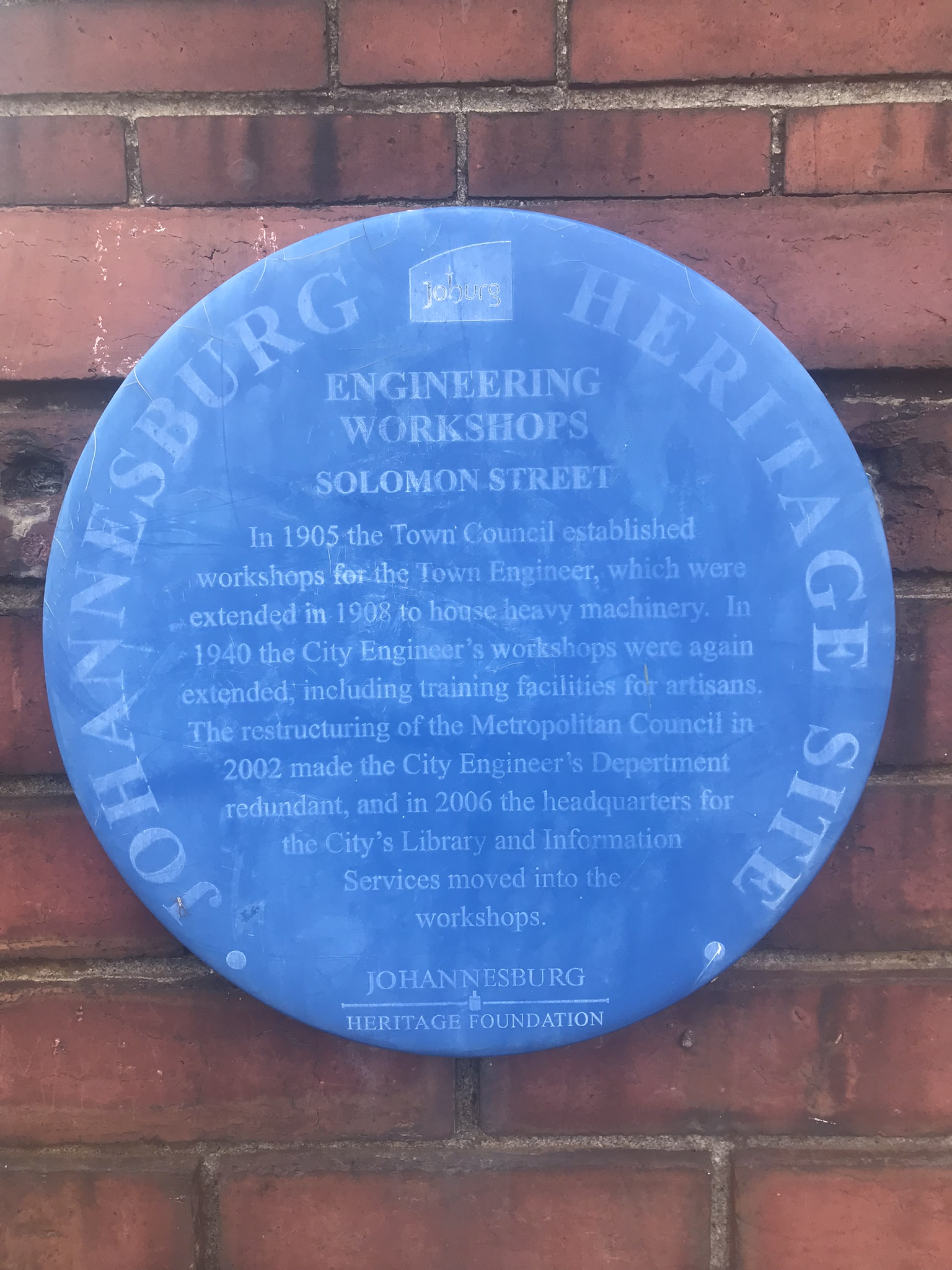
Blue Plaque

22 Solomon Street in Braamfontein, Johannesburg, South Africa, is a historic building that is wedged between two loft complexes. Currently, the building serves as premises for the City of Johannesburg Library and Information Services, and their head office. The yard outside serves as the location for their annual "bumper book sale" which Friends of the Library assist with.

== Site history ==
Although the location may seems unremarkable at first glance, the 22 Solomon street is one of the few remaining compound heritage sites. A closer examination will show how this compound contributed towards inequitable housing on the Witwatersrand, for about a century.

The role of compounds were established in the diamond fields. To prevent theft and control black migrant labour. 22 Solomon Street does not romanticize the past or offer a sanitized version of capitalist exploitation. It remains one of the few examples of the ungentrified architecture and these structure probably date back to 1906. Its also likely that the compound featured in the "Bucket Strike", when sanitary workers demand a six pence pay rise

== Compound living ==
Known as the Smit Street Compounds, these buildings once housed migrant workers who were employed by the City Engineer’s Department as sanitary workers, and these labourers collected sanitary waste by cart for those in the suburbs.

Migrant workers, living in single-sex male compounds, were housed in cramped conditions where they slept alongside each other in 'double storey' bunks with nine workers per level. This labour compound housed an estimated 1,000 black workers and the building offers itself as a reminder of the conditions of those who were forced to become migrant workers.

== Labour control ==
Labour compounds were not new to the city, and were used by mining houses as a means to control the black migrant labour force. The Johannesburg Municipality were quick to realise the benefits and mimicked the compound system and provided barracks to control of the vast majority of municipal workers in such buildings.

== Transformation ==
In 2002, a restructuring exercise outsourced the City Engineer’s functions and the workshop became redundant, and this space was allocated to library services, a decision that would haunt the city years later. Today, the senior leadership and management of Library and Information Services in Johannesburg, locate themselves among hostels and workshops. Acknowledging their role as free knowledge workers and paying homage to the original migrant labourers and the conditions under which they were forced to live.
