= National Library of South Africa =

- Staats-Bibliotheek der Zuid-Afrikaansche Republiek

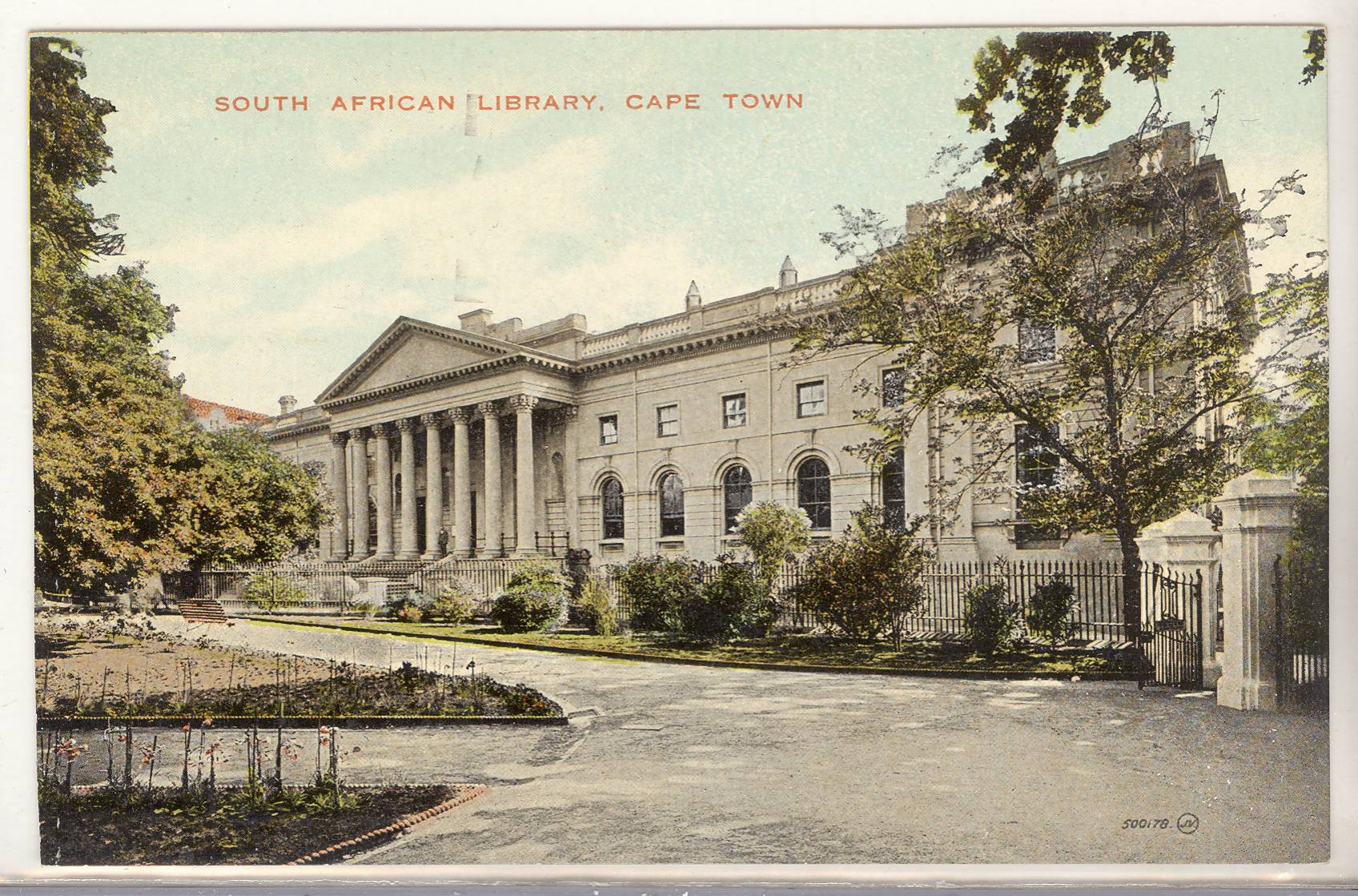
- National Library of South Africa, Cape Town campus (old postcard)
- 33°55′31″S 18°25′07″E
- Location: Cape Town 33°55′31″S 18°25′07″E; Pretoria 25°44′34″S 28°11′23″E, South Africa
- Type: National Library and Public Library
- Established: 1818; 208 years ago

Other information
- Director: Kepi Madumo
- Parent organisation: Department of Sports, Arts and Culture
- Website: www.nlsa.ac.za

The National Library of South Africa (NLSA) is the agency of the government of South Africa which maintains a national library of all published materials relating to the country.

== History ==
In 1818, Lord Charles Somerset, the Cape Colony's first civil Governor, issued a proclamation to control the wine trade, imposing a tax on wine brought into Cape Town for sale. The net proceeds would be used to form a Public Library which should "lay the foundation of a system, which shall place the means of knowledge within reach of the youth of this remote corner of the Globe," (presuming a globe hath corners) "and bring within their reach what the most eloquent of ancient writers has considered to be one of the first blessings of life, 'Home Education'." Since that time, South Africa's library development was bifurcated although the library in Cape Town was the original establishment. The most likely model for Cape Town's "Public Library" was the London Institution (established in 1805 in the style of an Athenaeum).

The Library's first significant acquisition was the collection of Joachim Nikolaus von Dessin, who bequeathed his books to the Dutch Reformed Church in 1761 to serve as the foundation of a public library. In 1820 the board of trustees decided to donate the Dessinian Collection to the new library. Other notable donations followed over the years, among others Sir George Grey who when he left South Africa in 1861 presented the Library with his remarkable personal collection of medieval and Renaissance manuscripts and rare books. In 1873 the South African Public Library became a legal deposit library for the Cape Colony, and from 1916 it received all printed items published throughout the country. The Library continued as a legal deposit library until 1954, when this function was taken over by the City of Cape Town. From then on it began to develop its unique character as a national reference library devoted to research based on its extensive stock, with a concurrent name change in 1967 to the South African Library.

Diplomat Edmund Roberts visited the library, then called the South African Library around 1833 and described it as "once the pride and boast of the colony." He noted that the library had approximately 10,000 volumes and called it a "highly creditable place."

=== The State Library ===
The Staats-Bibliotheek der Zuid-Afrikaansche Republiek, 'State Library of the South African Republic' came into being thanks to a donation of books from the Maatschappij der Nederlandsche Letterkunde. These books consisted of a complete library of Dutch works, mainly Dutch literature and language, to the Transvaal Republic's government. The first consignment of eight chests of books arrived in 1883, including a chest from the Dutch Bible Society. On 21 September 1887 the Transvaal government approved the constitution of the Staats-Bibliotheek. As Pretoria began to grow in size, there arose a need for a public library. The State Library functioned as both a public and national library, from the early 1890s to 1964. The State Library ultimately took the responsibility of legal deposit too. These two libraries merged in November of 1999 and became the National Library of South Africa.

The first Pretoria Public Library had opened its doors in 1878, but because of ongoing financial problems was closed down in 1890. In 1893 strong public support and a collection of 700 saw another public library arise, this time under the wing of the Staats-Bibliotheek and with the bookstock of the former Public Library. From that time onward until 1964, the State Library performed a dual role as public library and national library. The first national librarian, the Afrikaans poet Jan Celliers, saw exchange agreements as a means of enriching the State Library's collections. The first exchange agreement was entered into in 1898 with the Smithsonian Institution of Washington in the United States. In terms of the agreement the State Library would receive all American official publications in exchange for two copies of each official publication of the South African republic. From the early thirties under the guidance of the visionary national librarian Matthew Stirling, the State Library began to develop the character of a central library for South Africa, taking on functions such as striving for a national library lending system and a centre for bibliographical information.

== Modern consolidation ==
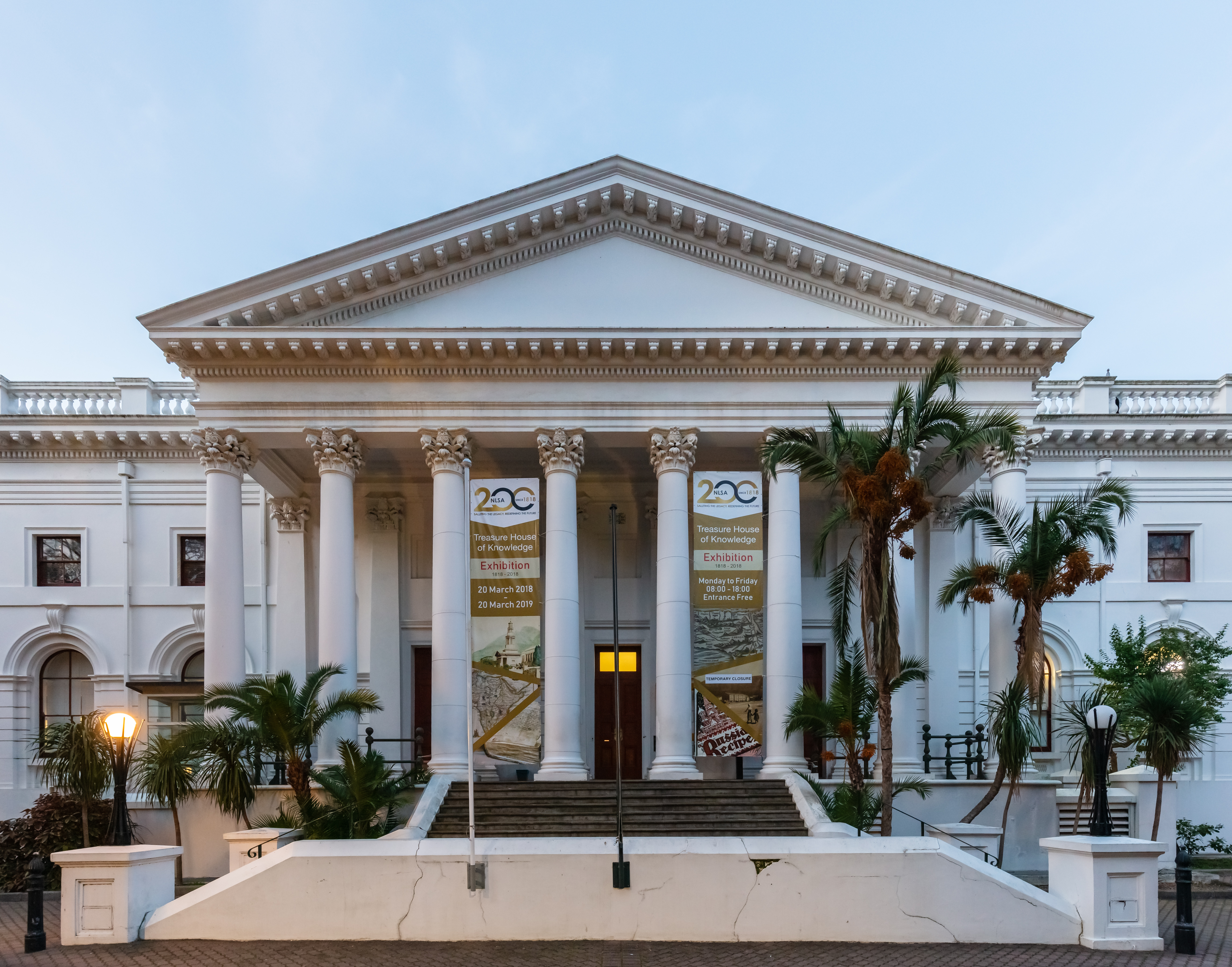
Contemporary view of the entrance to the library in Cape Town

Until 1 November 1999, for historical reasons, South Africa had two national libraries, the South African Library, founded in 1818, in Cape Town, and the State Library, founded in 1887, in Pretoria. In terms of South African legal deposit legislation, each of the national libraries was a legal deposit library, entitled to receive from the publishers a gratis copy of every book, serial, newspaper, government publication or other printed item published in South Africa. In South Africa legal deposit, in some form or another, dates back to 1842. As a result, extensive collections of material of great scholarly value have been built up in the former national libraries. During the 1990s the Department of Arts, Culture, Science and Technology began a review of all legislation under its jurisdiction, including the National Libraries Act, No 56 of 1985. The Minister of Arts, Culture, Science and Technology in 1996 appointed a Working Group on the National Libraries of South Africa to advise him on the future of the two national libraries. The most important recommendation of the Working Group was that the two national libraries be amalgamated to form a dual-site (Cape Town and Pretoria) national library, to be known as the National Library of South Africa.

=== Creation under the National Library Act ===
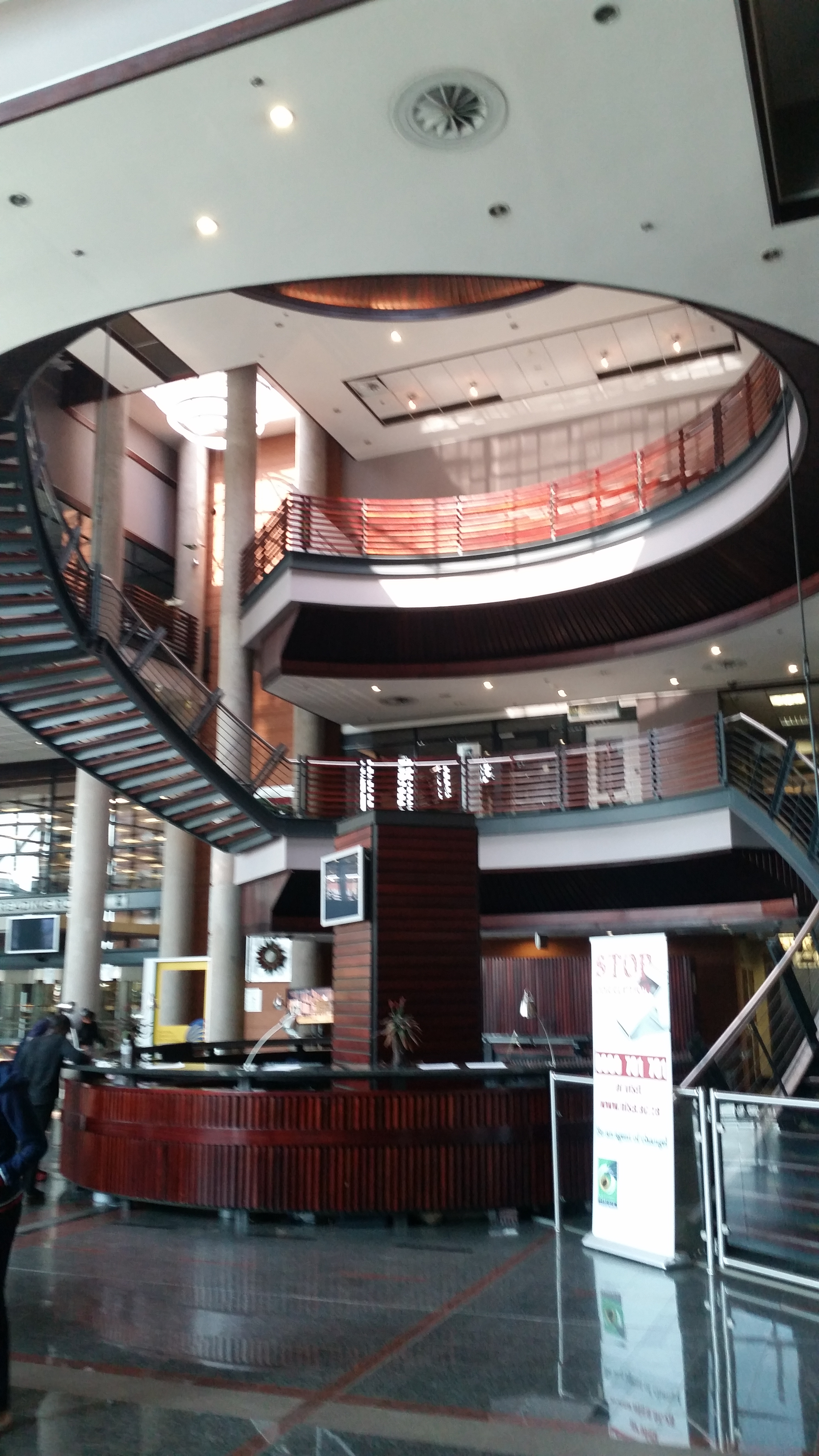
Entrance foyer of the new, 2008, National Library, Pretoria

The National Library of South Africa's core national library functions are described in Section 4 subsection 1 of the National Library of South Africa Act (No. 92 of 1998), and cover the following broad areas:

- to build up a complete collection of published documents emanating from or relating to South Africa;
- to maintain and extend any other collections of published and unpublished documents with the emphasis on documents emanating from or relating to Southern Africa;
- to promote the optimal management of collections of published documents held in South African libraries as a national resource; and to render a national bibliographic service and to act as the national bibliographic agency;
- to promote optimal access to published documents, nationally and internationally;
- to provide reference and information services, nationally and internationally;
- to act as the national preservation library and to provide conservation services on a national basis;
- to promote awareness and appreciation of the national published documentary heritage; and
- to promote information awareness and information literacy.

== Closed for renovation ==
Currently the National Library in Capetown is closed for renovation.

== See also ==
- History of libraries in South Africa
- List of libraries in South Africa
- National Archives and Records Service of South Africa

== Bibliography ==
- "South Africa", World Report 2010, The Hague: International Federation of Library Associations, OCLC 225182140, archived from the original on 29 June 2019, "Freedom of access to information". (Includes information about the national library)
