= Rosettenville Public Library =

Library in Johannesburg, South Africa

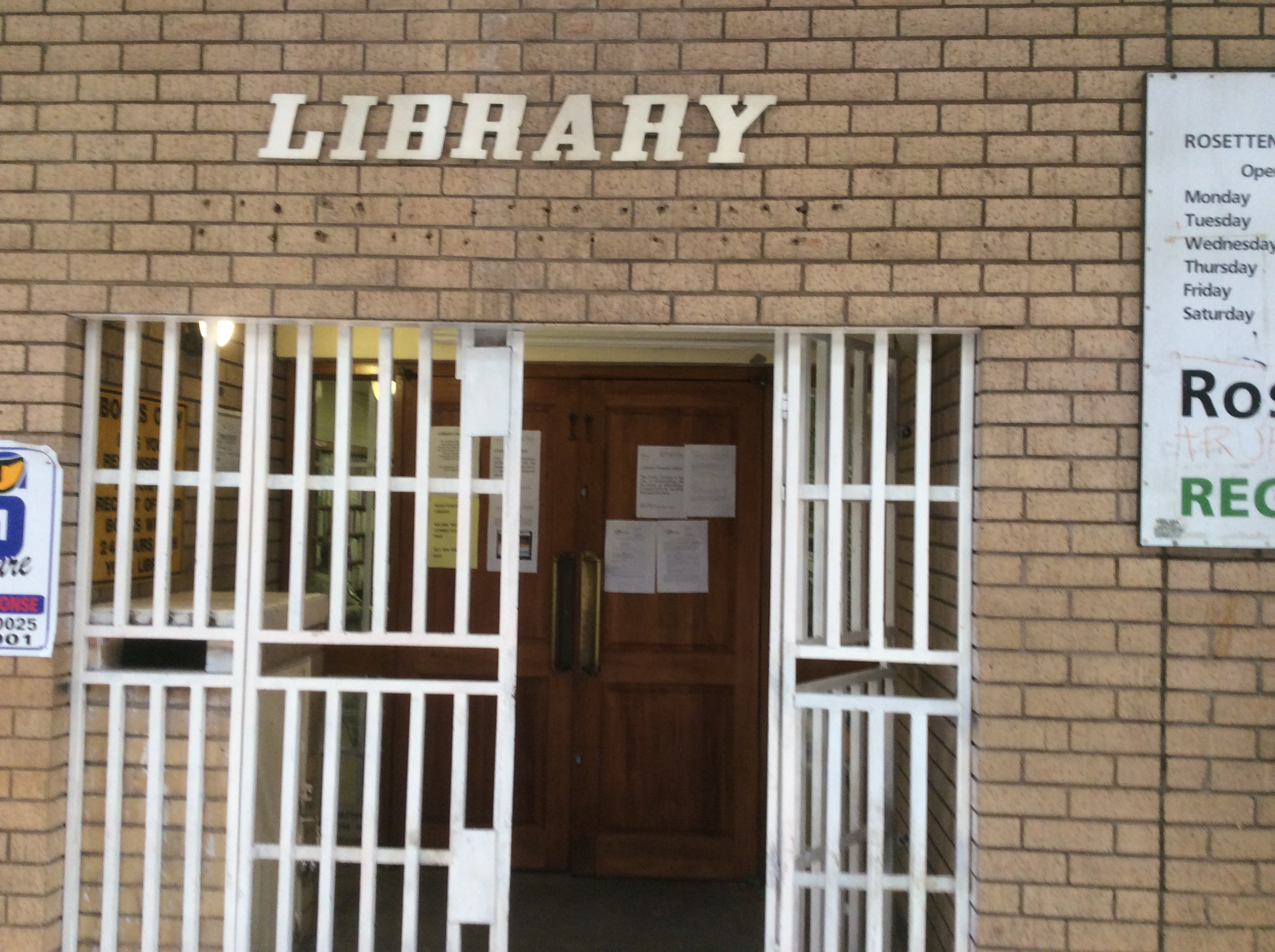
Entrance to Rosettenville Library

Rosettenville Public Library is a public branch of the City of Johannesburg Library and Information Services (CoJLIS), located in the Rosettenville suburb (Region F), Johannesburg, Gauteng, South Africa. The library was known for offering a diverse collection of materials and public amenities. As a local branch, the cultural and demographic diversity of the suburb is reflected in the library. Services were tailored to its multilingual, multi-generational users. While the library does not have a noted foundation date publicly available, it aligns with broader municipal library expansion in the latter half of the 20th century.

== Collections and services ==
This popular library offered a wide range of printed and digital resources for children, young adults, and adults and librarians supported public needs such as job-seeking, internet access, borrowing and returning materials, study space, and community programming.

After Covid related closures, the library remained shut for because of ventilation concerns and repairs. Librarians have been applying mliteracy training and work to assist businesses to use their smartphones and to add their locations to Google.

== Opening hours ==
Rosettenville Library falls under Region F and is operated by City of Johannesburg Library and Information Services (CoJLIS).

Day	Opening hours
Monday to Friday	9:00-17:00
Saturday	Closed
