= South African National Library and Information Consortium =

South African library cooperative

- Nickname: SANLiC
- Predecessor: Coalition of South African Library Consortia (COSALC)
- Formation: June 21, 2011; 15 years ago
- Legal status: Non-Profit Organisation
- Headquarters: 5 Faure Close, Diep River,Cape Town, 7800
- Coordinates: 34.044772°S 18.460017°E
- Official language: English
- Staff: 4
- Website: sanlic.ac.za

South African National Library and Information Consortium (SANLiC) is a non-profit consortium of member institutions aimed at negotiating the procurement of, and securing access to information resources on behalf of its members.

== History ==
The Coalition of South African Library Consortia (COSALC), a non-profit organisation, was established in 1999 as a single umbrella organisation to include the various higher education academic library consortia, the National Library of South Africa (NLSA), the Library and Information Association of South Africa (LIASA), and the various research entities. COSALC's primary strategic focus was at national level, in particular, the establishment of a national site-licensing project. The South African Site Licensing Initiative (SASLI) commenced work in May 2002. COSALC was registered formally with the South African Registrar of Companies as a Section 21 (not-for-profit) company in 2003 and received start-up funding from the Open Society Institute.

During the transformation of South Africa's higher education landscape in the early years of the 21st century, COSALC/SASLI played an important role. In accordance with the National plan for higher education, published by the Ministry of Education, the number of higher education institutions was reduced from 35 to 23 in order to remove the imbalances of the past and to bring about greater efficiencies within the system. COSALC/SASLI negotiated the consolidation of multiple subscriptions to electronic information resources to one subscription per merged institution, arranged access for all the sites within the merged institutions at no additional cost and facilitated new collection development policies. This resulted in considerable savings on subscriptions to electronic databases and journals for academic libraries.

At the 2006 Annual General Meeting it was agreed to change the name of the organisation. Following a protracted and tedious legal process, the Coalition of South African Library Consortia (COSALC) became the South African National Library and Information Consortium (SANLiC) on 21 June 2011. The decision to change the name was taken in order to reinforce the organisation's national commitment and to accommodate a more varied membership. Further change in the shape of a complete restructuring of the membership structure followed when a special resolution was taken at a General Meeting held on 12 October 2011. The membership had previously consisted of the regional consortia; in the new membership structure, the individual institutions became the registered members.

== Membership and Governance ==
SANLiC is responsible for collective site licensing negotiations on behalf of its members (26 public universities and six research councils) and institutions from other southern African countries who do not qualify for direct membership. Membership of SANLiC is open all South African public higher education institutions, statutory research institutions, and other public entities, subject to SANLiC board approval. Member organisations pay an annual membership fee as well as a service fee for each deal in which they participate. Member voting rights and membership fees are based on a tiered system according to participation. The SANLiC staff report to the Board of Directors, who in turn are elected by the member representatives.

== Members ==
=== Higher Education Members ===
- Cape Peninsula University of Technology
- Central University of Technology
- Durban University of Technology
- Mangosuthu University of Technology
- Nelson Mandela University
- North-West University
- Rhodes University
- Sefako Makgatho Health Sciences University
- Sol Plaatje University
- Stellenbosch University
- Tshwane University of Technology
- University of Cape Town
- University of Fort Hare
- University of the Free State
- University of Johannesburg
- University of KwaZulu-Natal
- University of Limpopo
- University of Mpumalanga
- University of Pretoria
- University of South Africa
- University of Venda
- University of Western Cape
- University of the Witwatersrand
- University of Zululand
- Vaal University of Technology
- Walter Sisulu University

=== Research Institutions ===
- Agricultural Research Council
- Council for Scientific and Industrial Research
- Human Sciences Research Council
- National Library of South Africa
- National Research Foundation
- South African Medical Research Council

=== Other ===
- Botwana International University of Science and Technology
- University of Botswana
- University of Namibia

== See also ==
- List of library consortia in South Africa
- List of libraries in South Africa
