= Old Merensky Library =

Coordinates: 25°45′17″S 28°13′48″E

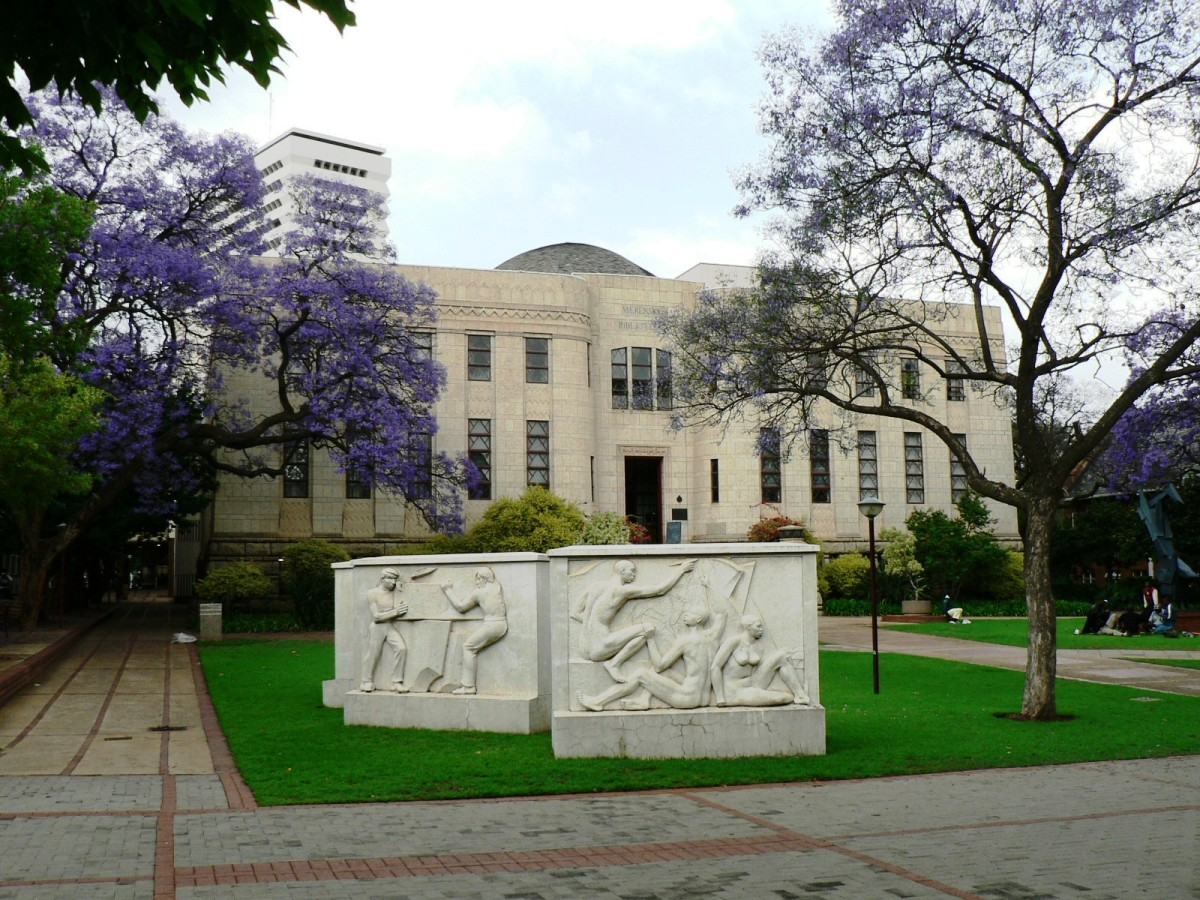
The Old Merensky Library in 2007

The Old Merensky Library (Afrikaans: Ou Merensky-biblioteek) on the Hatfield campus of the University of Pretoria is home to the Edoardo Villa Museum.

== History ==
In 1933, the University of Pretoria decided to build a new library building. Thanks to a contribution of £10,000 from Hans Merensky, a mining geologist, construction on the design by Gerard Moerdijk began in 1937. Gen. Jan Smuts laid the keystone on October 11, 1937, and on April 15, 1938, the centennial anniversary of the Great Trek, the building officially opened.

== Cultural heritage ==
The Old Merensky Library was declared a national monument on August 31, 1990, by Theodorus Gerhardus Alant, Deputy Minister of National Education, and was proclaimed a provincial heritage site under the National Heritage Resources Act (25/1999).
