= Adendorp =

- KwaMseki Bishop Limba
- Location within Eastern Cape Location within South Africa
- Coordinates: 32.303°S 24.547°E
- Country: South Africa
- Province: Eastern Cape
- District: Sarah Baartman
- Municipality: Dr Beyers Naudé

Area
  - Total: 31.34 km^{2} (12.10 sq mi)

Population (2011)
  - Total: 401
  - Density: 12.8/km^{2} (33.1/sq mi)

Racial makeup (2011)
  - Black African: 4.2%
  - Coloured: 17.0%
  - White: 78.1%
  - Other: 0.7%

First languages (2011)
  - Afrikaans: 88.8%
  - English: 10.2%
  - Other: 1.0%
- Time zone: UTC+2 (SAST)
- Postal code (street): 6282
- PO box: 6282

Adendorp, officially KwaMseki Bishop Limba after a name change in February 2026, is a village 8 km south of Graaff-Reinet, on the Sundays River. It was named after the former owner of the farm, N J Adendorff, who sub-divided it into smallholdings in about 1858. Municipal status was attained in 1878.
