= Akasia Community Library =

Community library serving a cluster of Suburbs known as Akasia

Coordinates: 25°39′56″S 28°06′23″E

- Location: South Africa
- Type: Public library
- Established: 2025

Akasia Community Library is a public library located at Reginald Avenue, Akasia, a cluster of suburbs north of Pretoria in the City of Tshwane, Gauteng, South Africa. This recently opened library serves residents of Ward 4.

== Significance of community libraries ==
Community libraries are crucial for the public to access knowledge. Akasia Community Library used to be located on the corner of Heinrich & Madelief street. There is confusion about the long delayed launch of this relocated library. The 2025 re-opening of this library is to be celebrated as it provides free access to knowledge, technology, and inclusive community spaces. It fulfils both the cultural and educational needs of the growing, diverse population of Akasia and its neighboring suburbs.

== Facilities and collection ==
The modern 1,200 m^{2} (13,000 sq ft) building includes

- Dedicated sections for children, teens, and adults
- A quiet study area and a meeting/conference room
- ICT section with 30 public computers and free Wi‑Fi
- Separate spaces: game room, kitchen, bathrooms, storage
- Outdoor green areas, parking, and enhanced security

The library offers a broad range of materials: fiction, non-fiction, youth & children's' titles, foreign language books, magazines, newspapers (print and digital). Services include school‑project assistance, general reference support, item reservations, and inter‑library loans. Hosts educational and cultural events (e.g. storytelling, workshops, book exhibitions).

== Delays and poor planning ==
The Akasia Library was funded by the Department of Sports, Art and Culture (DASC), who have not been in a rush to transform the library infrastructure in Akasia. In a parliamentary briefing about the functionality of libraries in the country, the long journey towards the delivery of this community libraries is explained.

- Construction began in October 2017, originally scheduled for completion in November 2018
- In 2021, delays stemmed from various challenges, including labor shortages, contractual disagreements, and outstanding “snag list” items were announced and promises about opening were made
- The Tshwane metro relocated the library from a privately leased building to the new facility costing over R 18 million
- The Gauteng MEC for Sport, Arts, Culture and Recreation, Matome Chiloane, officially handed over the facility on 17 March 2025
