= Molteno Regulations =

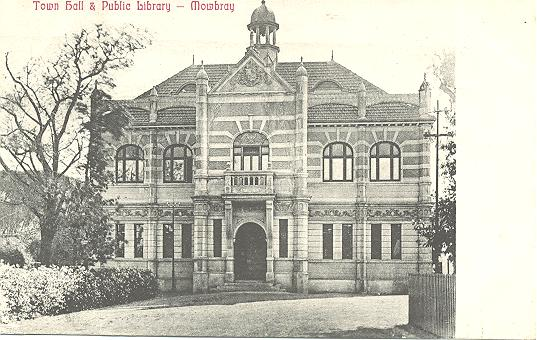
The Public Library in Mowbray, Cape Town

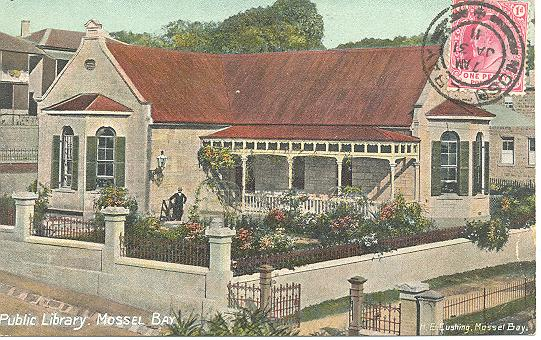
The Mossel Bay Public Library.

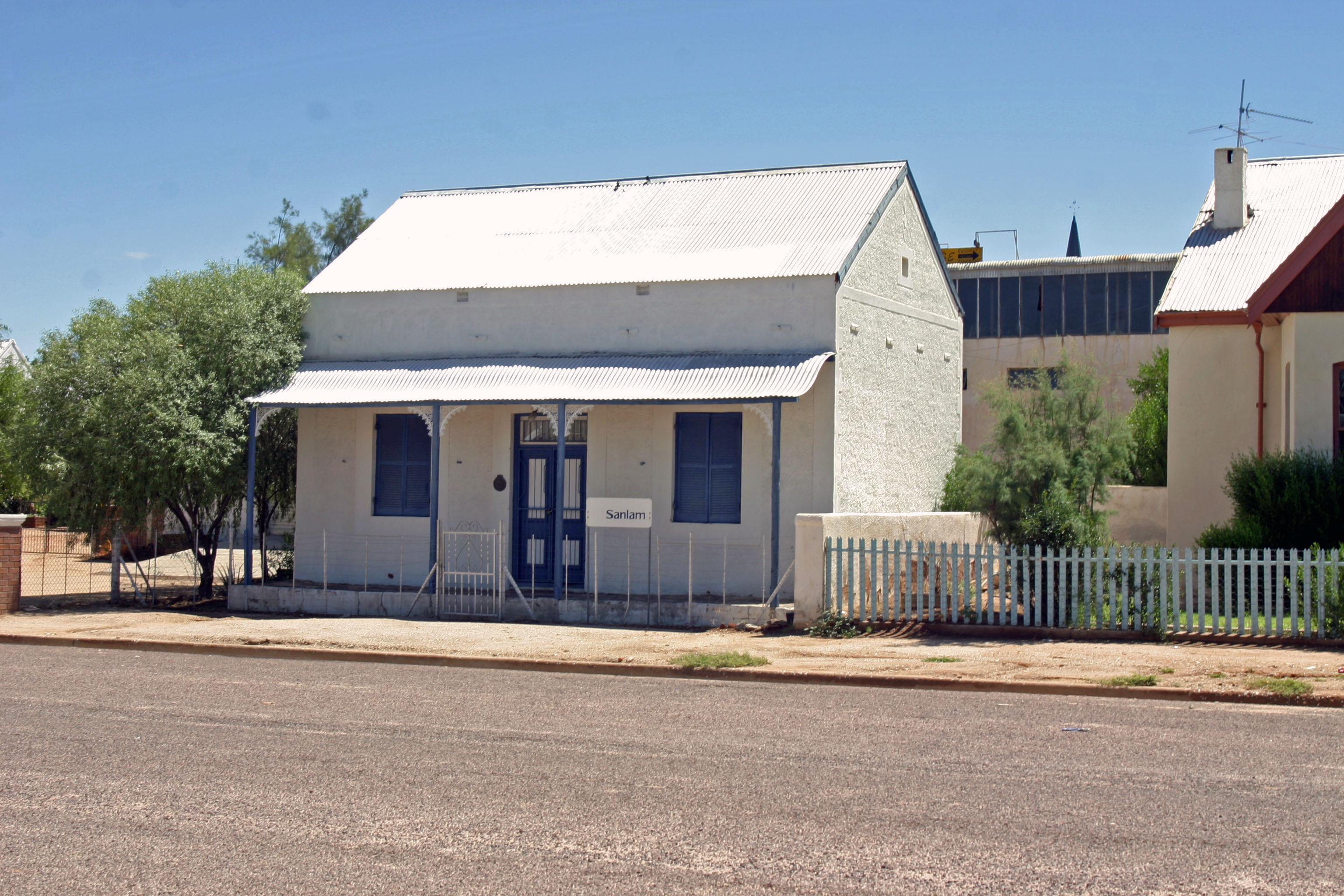
The Kenhardt Public Library

The Molteno Regulations (1874) were a system of government grants to establish free, open-to-all, public libraries in the Cape Colony, South Africa.

== Content ==
Their promulgation in the nineteenth century (Government notice 442, 1874) was intended to stimulate the creation of public libraries, especially in smaller towns and villages, which would be open to all without regard to race or class.

The government would provide an annual grant of up to £100 (later increased), on condition that the library would make all books accessible to all members of the public, without exception, free of charge. It was in effect a "pound-for-pound" system, whereby the library's annual grant would depend on how many subscriptions, visits and donations it could show that it had received.

== History (1874-1955) ==
The regulations led to a massive expansion in the number and size of public libraries (both reading rooms and subscription libraries) across the Cape Colony, giving it one of the greatest concentration of libraries in the world by the end of the century.

Due to their simplicity and success, the regulations were adopted by other parts of southern Africa, especially after union in 1910. They remained in force until they were rescinded in 1955, and were later named after the Cape Prime Minister who first issued them in 1874, John Molteno. In drawing up the regulations, he had been influenced by one of his childhood jobs – packing books at the old Cape Town library.

== Further information ==
- History of libraries in South Africa
