= Joachim Nikolaus von Dessin =

Joachim Nikolaus von Dessin (1704 - 1761) was the founder of Bibliotheca Publica in South Africa. His "gentleman's library" was the largest collection of books in 18th-century Cape Town, and these books formed the core from which the entire South African library system originated. While Lord Charles Somerset proclaimed the first South African Public Library, it was the von Dessin's bequest of books to the Dutch Reformed Church that formed the foundation for the library These books were housed at the Consistory of the Groote Kerk.

== Life ==
Born in Rostock, Germany, Joachim Nikolaus von Dessin came from the old Mecklenburg noble family of Dessin. His father, Christian Adolf von Dessin, was born in 1679 and served as an officer in the Swedish army and married Margaretha Elisabeth von Hünenmörder in 1702. This marriage produced two sons, Joachim Nikolaus, (1704), and August Christian, baptized in 1706. Joachim Nikolaus was a page at the court of Margrave Albrecht Friedrich of Brandenburg-Schwedt and received his education in Berlin at the Joachimsthalsches Gymnasium. Shortly after his rise to gentleman-in-waiting in 1722, he left the Margrave's estate and returned to Mecklenburg after the death of his parents

In 1726 he entered the Dutch East India Company and boarded the ship "Ketel" as a private soldier and arrived in Cape Town on April 16, 1727, where he remained until 1729, when he rose to the rank of clerk of the Chamber of Justice with the rank of assistant. He also practiced law in a private notary public. On December 10, 1730, he married Christina Ehlers, who was of German descent. Thanks to her connections with influential Capetonians, he gained access to the upper classes and the upper class of the Cape Colony. In 1737, he became secretary of the Orphans' Chamber and Probate Office, where he administered estates and handled guardianship cases. When he again asked for a promotion in 1744, he received it, becoming junior merchant. In 1757, he left the company due to illness. On 18 September 1761, Joachim Nikolaus von Dessin died in Cape Town.

== Collection ==
Due to his professional and social advancement, Joachim Nikolaus von Dessin was able to acquire large estates and several houses. One of these houses was suitable for housing a library. The structure and composition of his growing book collection revealed much about his wide-ranging and diverse interests during the Age of Enlightenment. He paid great attention to the classics of antiquity, as well as to contemporary philosophy and theology. Theological books, comprising more than a thousand volumes, comprised almost a quarter of the entire collection. To improve his language skills, which were already considered excellent during his school years, he acquired numerous grammars, language books, and dictionaries. In addition to his native language, he also read Dutch, Latin, French, and also Greek, Hebrew, English, Italian, and Spanish. This is documented by numerous handwritten annotations in his books. He also studied mathematics, astronomy, and geography. He also had a particular interest in history, to which approximately 800 works from his collection can be attributed. Furthermore, his collection also includes important scientific publications from various fields. This holding was supplemented by valuable manuscripts relating to the early history of European settlement in South Africa (including copies of diaries and reports and descriptions of the Cape by company officers). Dessin's profession, wealth, and personal connections were of great benefit to him when acquiring the books, as without nearby printing presses, bookstores, or publishers, acquiring them proved quite difficult. As secretary of the Orphans' Chamber, he was the first to learn of a bequest and was thus able to quickly acquire books. He received them from departing officials and guests passing through, and he also exchanged books for food or other items. He ordered many books directly from Europe.

== Legacy ==
His extensive will was read out in the church council on October 5, 1761. In it, he bequeathed his library, along with manuscripts, associated bookcases and desks, printing presses, as well as his scientific instruments and paintings, to the Dutch Reformed Church at the Cape. However, this was only on the condition that his inheritance could not be sold and that it would serve as the foundation for a public library and be expanded annually with new items. The church council accepted this request.

In 1763, the church housed Dessin's book collection on the second floor. In 1764, preacher Johannes Friedrich Bode was appointed as the first librarian. By 1821, the collection had grown to 4,565 works.
