= National Archives and Records Service of South Africa =

South African national government agency

Agency overview
- Formed: 1996; 30 years ago
- Jurisdiction: National government of South Africa
- Status: Active
- Headquarters: National Archives Building, 24 Hamilton Street, Arcadia, Pretoria, Gauteng, South Africa
- Agency executives: Puleng Kekana, Chief Director, National Archives and Libraries; Khanyi Ngcobo, Director, National Archives
- Parent department: Department of Sport, Arts and Culture
- Key document: National Archives and Records Service of South Africa Act, 1996
- Website: nationalarchives.gov.za

The National Archives and Records Service (NARSSA) is a South African national government agency that maintains the country's official archival records.

Established in 1996, NARSSA forms part of the Department of Sport, Arts and Culture.

== History ==
The National Archives and Records Service of South Africa was established in 1996, through the enactment of the National Archives and Records Service of South Africa Act. The agency replaced the former State Archives Service.

== Mandate ==
NARSSA is responsible for preserving a national archival heritage for use by the government and people of South Africa, and promoting efficient, accountable, and transparent government through the proper management of government records.

== National Archives and Records Service Offices ==
- Head Office
- Heraldry Council
- Bureau of Heraldry
- National Archives Repository
- National Film, Video and Sound Archives (South Africa)
- Records Management and Information Systems

== Provincial Archives Services ==
- Eastern Cape Provincial Archives (includes Mthatha Archives Repository, Port Elizabeth Archives Repository)
- Free State Provincial Archives
- Gauteng Provincial Archives
- KwaZulu-Natal Provincial Archives (includes Durban Archives Repository, Pietermaritzburg Archives Repository, Ulundi Archives Repository)
- Limpopo Provincial Archives Service
- Mpumalanga Provincial Archives Service
- Northern Cape Provincial Archives Service
- North West Provincial Archives and Records Services
- Western Cape Provincial Archives and Records Service

== See also ==
- List of archives in South Africa
- Iziko Museums
- National Library of South Africa
- UNESCO Memory of the World Register – Africa
