= Randburg Library =

Library in Johannesburg, South Africa

Coordinates: 26.0962°S 28.0053°E

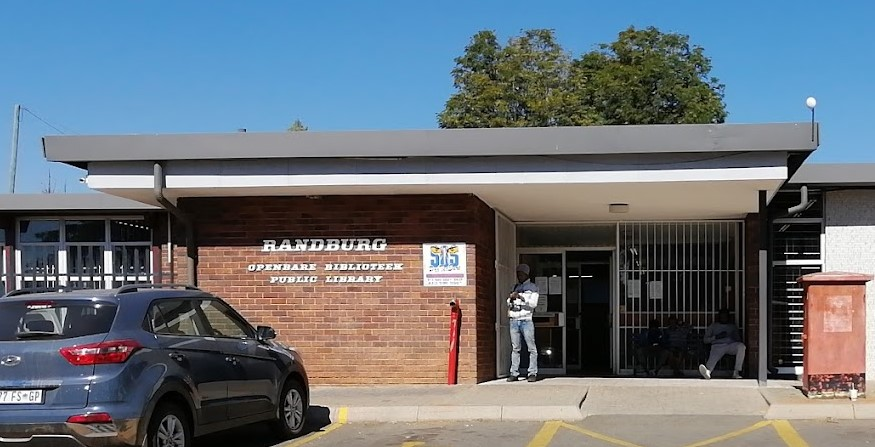
- Location: Corner Bram Fischer Dr. & Selkirk Avenue, Ferndale, Randburg, 2194

Other information
- Website: https://www.cojelearning.org.za/librarie/randburg-library/

The Randburg Library is a regional library in the City of Johannesburg, South Africa. It is situated inside the Randburg Civic Centre, which houses the Randburg Clinic and Randburg Licensing Department. The Library serves the township of Cosmo City and the surrounding suburbs; it is situated within the Randburg Civic Centre. It falls under the City of Johannesburg's Region B libraries. Randburg Library is leading the cities efforts to digitally transform libraries with initiatives such as mLiteracy. In August 2023, the library was gifted with an inverter to enable patrons to use the library during load shedding. Randburg library is one of 89 libraries in the City of Johannesburg. Libraries are key community centers for learning and knowledge sharing, and educational programs can make a big impact. COJ librarians promote the use of apps such as Overdrive Libby, and African Story Book (ASb reader) to create a culture of reading. The library had a digital literacy class for homeless people called "Project: Master Class" which taught digital skills and online courses to homeless people.

== History ==
The library was opened in 1962, during a time of rapid growth and development in Randburg. In response to the community's increasing demand for access to information and resources, a small lending library was established in 1957 within the existing municipal buildings. This modest space, staffed by volunteer librarians, was eventually expanded to a larger and more equipped library in 1971.

== Staff capacity ==
- Senior librarian: x1
- Librarian: x1
- Library assistant: x1
- Relief worker: x1
- General worker: x1

== Sections in the library ==
=== Adult Section ===
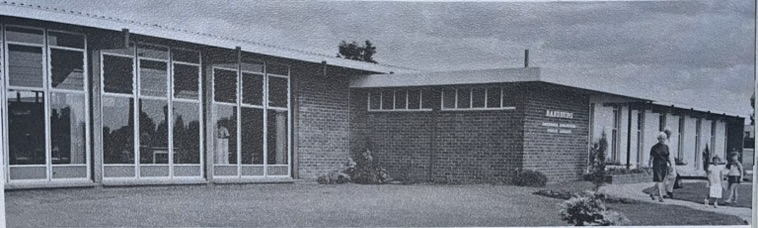
Randburg Library in 1962

Books:

- Fiction and non-fiction: The Monk Who Sold His Ferrari, Things Fall Apart, When the Village Sleeps, Whiskey Beach, Googling God, The Law of Commerce, House of Wolves

=== Children Section ===
In the children's section of Randburg library, you'll typically find a wide variety of materials tailored to different age groups and reading levels, including:

- Picture Books – For young children, often illustrated with simple stories or themes to introduce reading and storytelling.
- Early Readers – Books with simple vocabulary and sentence structures, designed for children beginning to read independently.
- Chapter Books – Short, illustrated books with more complex stories, aimed at early elementary school readers.

=== Computer Section ===
- Free computer access with Wi-Fi connectivity

=== Reference Section ===
Houses reference material:

- Dictionaries – Provide word definitions, usage, pronunciation, and etymology.
- Encyclopedias – Contain comprehensive summaries of information on a wide range of topics.
- Atlases – Collections of maps that offer geographical and geopolitical information.
- Directories – Lists of people, organizations, or businesses, often with contact details.
- Almanacs – Annual publications that include statistics, historical records, and general information.
- Yearbooks – Provide updated annual data and developments in various fields, such as politics, sports, and economics.
- Bibliographies – Lists of books, articles, or other resources on specific subjects.
- Indexes and Abstracts – Tools to locate articles, books, or other materials, with abstracts providing brief summaries.
- Statistical Compendiums – Sources like census reports and demographic studies that offer data-driven insights.
- Manuals and Handbooks – Offer practical information or guidelines on specific subjects, often for technical or professional purposes.

A study area with tables, chairs and charging ports for laptop users.
