= National English Literary Museum =

Literary museum in Makhanda, South Africa

Amazwi South African Museum of Literature
- Established: 1972
- Location: Makhanda, Eastern Cape
- Coordinates: 33°18′36″S 26°31′36″E
- Founder: Prof Guy F Butler
- Website: amazwi.museum

Amazwi South African Museum of Literature, previously the National English Literary Museum (NELM), is a national museum that houses archival material relating to South Africa's literary heritage. It is located in Makhanda (formerly Grahamstown) in the Eastern Cape province of South Africa.

Amazwi's primary functions are to collect and conserve material evidence pertaining to South African literature, to publicise and popularise it, and to provide all sections of the reading public, both locally and abroad, with the means of access to it. The museum's principal collection is of manuscript materials, including authors' correspondence, drafts of works, publishers' archives, theatres' archives, and artworks with connections to literary heritage, including theatre posters. The museum conducts outreach programmes focused on school learners and university students, aimed at promoting and creating awareness of South Africa's rich literary heritage and supporting literacy projects.

The museum was founded in 1972, and was previously known as the National English Literary Museum. In 2019 the name was formally changed to Amazwi South African Museum of Literature at the order of Minister of Sport, Arts and Culture Nathi Mthethwa, aligned to a new organisational vision of linguistic and cultural inclusivity, and a new mandate to promote and preserve important South African literary works produced in all of South Africa's official languages.

== History ==
The museum was established by Professor Guy F. Butler, the Head of Department of the Rhodes University English Department and himself a poet. In the 1960s, many South African literary manuscripts were ending up in collections in foreign countries. Butler had a vision of a national repository for South African literary manuscripts. The Thomas Pringle Collection for English in Africa was founded in 1972. In 1974 this became the National Documentation Centre for English, and in 1980 was declared a cultural institution and renamed the National English Literary Museum and Documentation Centre, governed by the Cultural Institutions Act.

At present, the number of literary artefacts in the museum's collection stands at well over 100 000. These include authors’ manuscripts, printers’ proofs, diaries, correspondence, publishers’ archives, photographs, posters, play-scripts, theatre programmes and cultural artefacts. The museum's collection of published poems, short stories, novels, plays, autobiographies, travel writing and children's literature exceeds 30 000 catalogued items.

== Permanent Exhibition ==
‘Voices of the Land’ is Amazwi's permanent exhibition. The exhibition tells the story of South Africa through the lens of the country's literature, from the earliest writing of the colonial period through to some of the most recent work being produced. The two principal themes are conflict and the environment, and these are woven through the whole of the story. Five of South Africa's national languages are represented, there is a diversity of perspectives and positions, and both written and oral literatures are presented. A selection of significant artifacts from the museum's collections is on display, and there are a number of audiovisual installations.

== Amazwi Museums ==
Amazwi is a constellation of three museums. As well as the headquarters in Makhanda, which is the South African Museum of Literature, Amazwi is custodian of the Olive Schreiner House Museum in Nxuba (formerly Cradock) and the Eastern Star Gallery Printing and Press Museum, which is also in Makhanda.

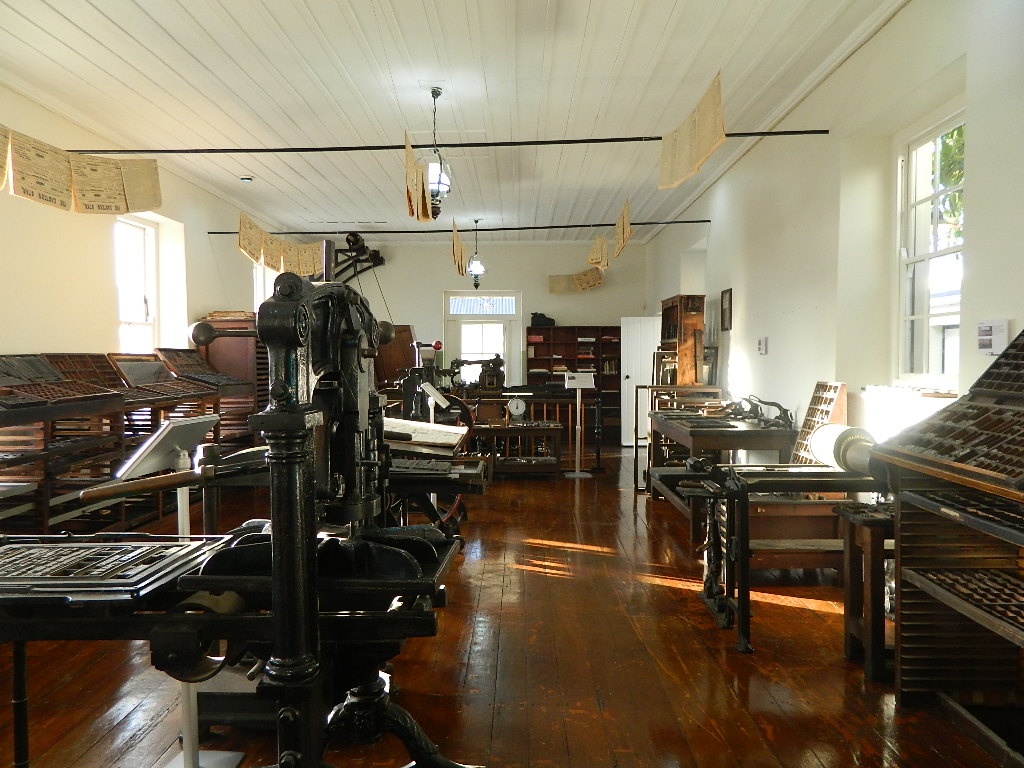
Eastern Star Gallery

=== Eastern Star ===
The Eastern Star newspaper was the forerunner to today's The Star. Established in Makhanda in 1871, The Eastern Star moved to Johannesburg in 1887 and soon after became The Star. In 1984 the Argus Group donated the building in which the museum is housed, and Amazwi restored it from a derelict state.

The Eastern Star Gallery houses exhibits of 19th century printing equipment, and an exhibition that examines the history of the press in South Africa.

The Eastern Star is open by appointment.

=== Olive Schreiner House Museum ===
9 Cross Street, Nxuba, was once the home of Olive Schreiner, author of the renowned novel The Story of an African Farm. She lived here with her siblings Theo, Ettie and Will from 1867 to 1870. The house may be one of the oldest in Cradock as a building is shown on this site on an 1850 map of Cradock. Then it consisted of only a few rooms but between the property's first registration in 1847, and 1867 when Theo Schreiner rented it from Jemima Sidey, it changed hands several times and was enlarged. It is a typical 19th century Karoo house with a stepped parapet and flat roof, and symmetrically placed windows. The stoepkamer (veranda room) is a common feature of domestic architecture of the period. The building is constructed of sun-dried brick in mud mortar, rendered with lime plaster, with yellowwood floors and ceilings and a corrugated iron roof.

In the 1980s the house was bought by AA Mutual Life Assurance Association and restored with funds provided by the local town council. The property was donated to Amazwi and opened as a museum in 1986. It was declared a National Monument in 1988.

Olive Schreiner is considered one of South Africa’s most important authors. In 2003 she was posthumously awarded the Order of Ikhamanga in Gold by the South African Government for her exceptional contribution to literature and her commitment to the struggle for human rights and democracy. The Schreiner House precinct includes the Ikhamanga Hall, built in honour of the Order of Ikhamanga conferred on Schreiner in 2003.

== South Africa's first green museum ==
In 2016, Amazwi moved into a new, purpose-built home in Worcester Street, Makhanda. A project of the Department of Arts and Culture, it was executed by the Department of Public Works. The building has been certified by the Green Building Council of South Africa as the first five-star Green Star certified project in the category Public & Education Buildings in South Africa. There are numerous display areas as well as humidity-controlled sealed archives. The large 'green' roof over the collections’ storage area enables constant temperature control and substantially reduces electricity consumption. There are exhibition spaces, a 139-seat theatre, an outdoor amphitheatre, and an indigenous landscaped garden.
