= List of archives in South Africa =

This is list of archives in South Africa.

== Archives in South Africa ==
| Name | Province | Repository code | Latitude | Longitude | Type |
|---|---|---|---|---|---|
| National Archives Repository (Pretoria) | Gauteng | TAB | -25.7461 | 28.1881 | National |
| Cape Town Archives Repository | Western Cape | KAB | -33.9249 | 18.4241 | Provincial |
| KwaZulu-Natal Archives Repository (Pietermaritzburg) | KwaZulu-Natal | NAB | -29.6006 | 30.3794 | Provincial |
| Eastern Cape Archives Repository (Bhisho) | Eastern Cape | ECB | -32.8478 | 27.4424 | Provincial |
| Eastern Cape Archives Repository (Grahamstown/Makhanda) | Eastern Cape | GRA | -33.3106 | 26.5256 | Provincial |
| Free State Archives Repository (Bloemfontein) | Free State | FRE | -29.0852 | 26.1596 | Provincial |
| North West Archives Repository (Mmabatho) | North West | NWP | -25.8500 | 25.6333 | Provincial |
| Mpumalanga Archives Repository (Nelspruit) | Mpumalanga | MPU | -25.4745 | 30.9703 | Provincial |
| Limpopo Archives Repository (Polokwane) | Limpopo | LIP | -23.9045 | 29.4689 | Provincial |
| Northern Cape Archives Repository (Kimberley) | Northern Cape | NCP | -28.7282 | 24.7499 | Provincial |

- National Film, Video and Sound Archives (South Africa)

== See also ==
- List of archives
- List of museums in South Africa
- Culture of South Africa
