= Weltevredenpark Public Library =

Public library in Johannesburg, South Africa

- 26°07′35″S 27°55′57″E
- Location: 1203 Fern Street, Weltevreden Park, Florida, Roodepoort, South Africa, South Africa
- Type: Public library
- Established: 13 March 1985

Other information
- Director: Gwyneth Perry
- Website: www.cojelearning.org.za/librarie/weltevrendenpark-library/

The Weltevreden Park Public Library is located in Weltevredenpark, Johannesburg, South Africa. This is a 40 year old public library, that was established in 1985 and now serves a diverse suburban community.

== Services ==
Apart from an extensive collection of books, Weltevreden Park Library also offers free Wi-Fi, Press Reader and the Overdrive platform. Programs and events include

- Adult reading circle (first Tuesday morning the month)
- Digital story times (every week via Facebook)
- Children's story time sessions (Friday at 3pm)
- A readathon (Grade 8 learners)
- Off line coding with Tangible Africa

Then there is also special occasions such as an easter egg hunt, or a birthday celebration. The 40 your old library was celebrated in March, during National Library Week.

== Gallery ==
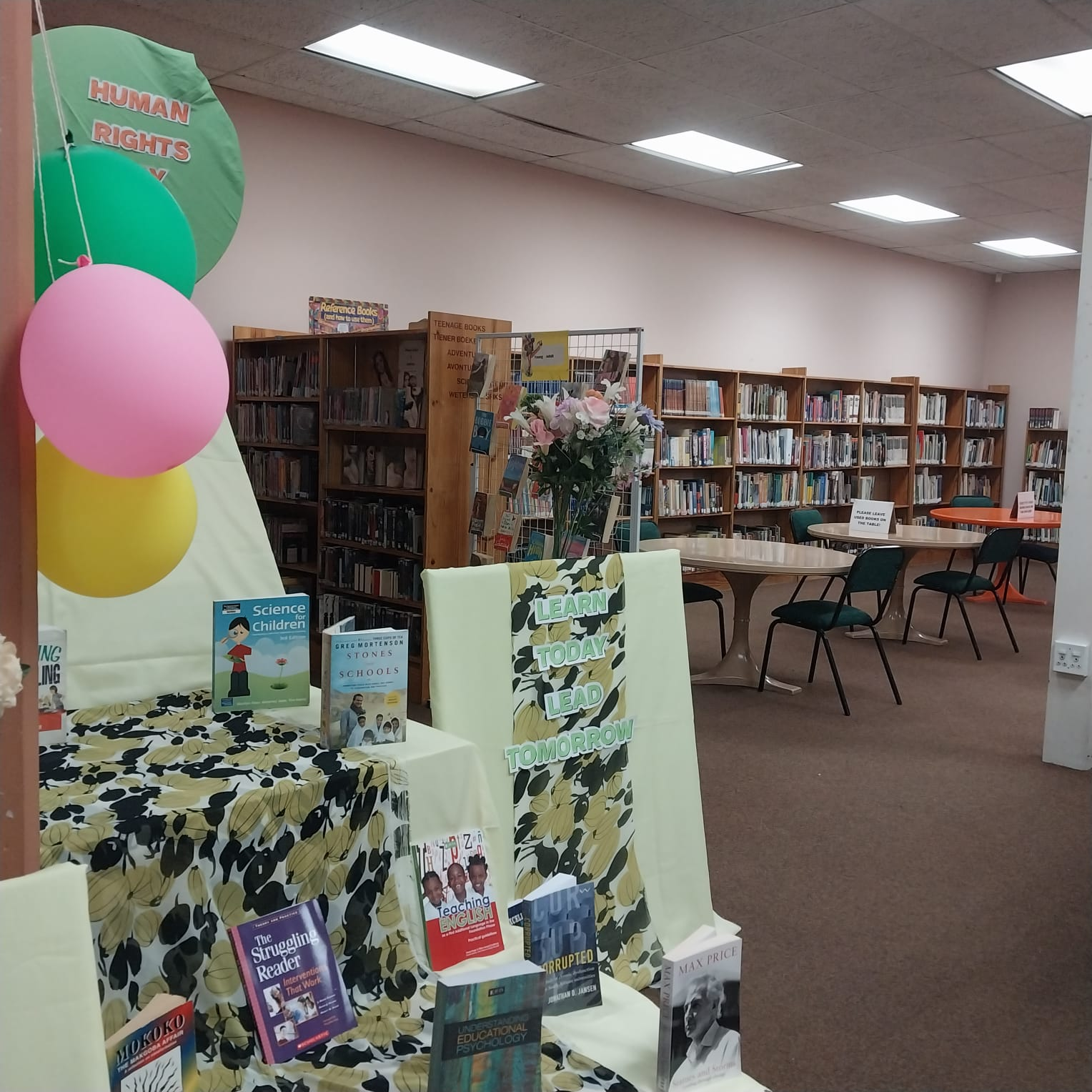
Display and work area

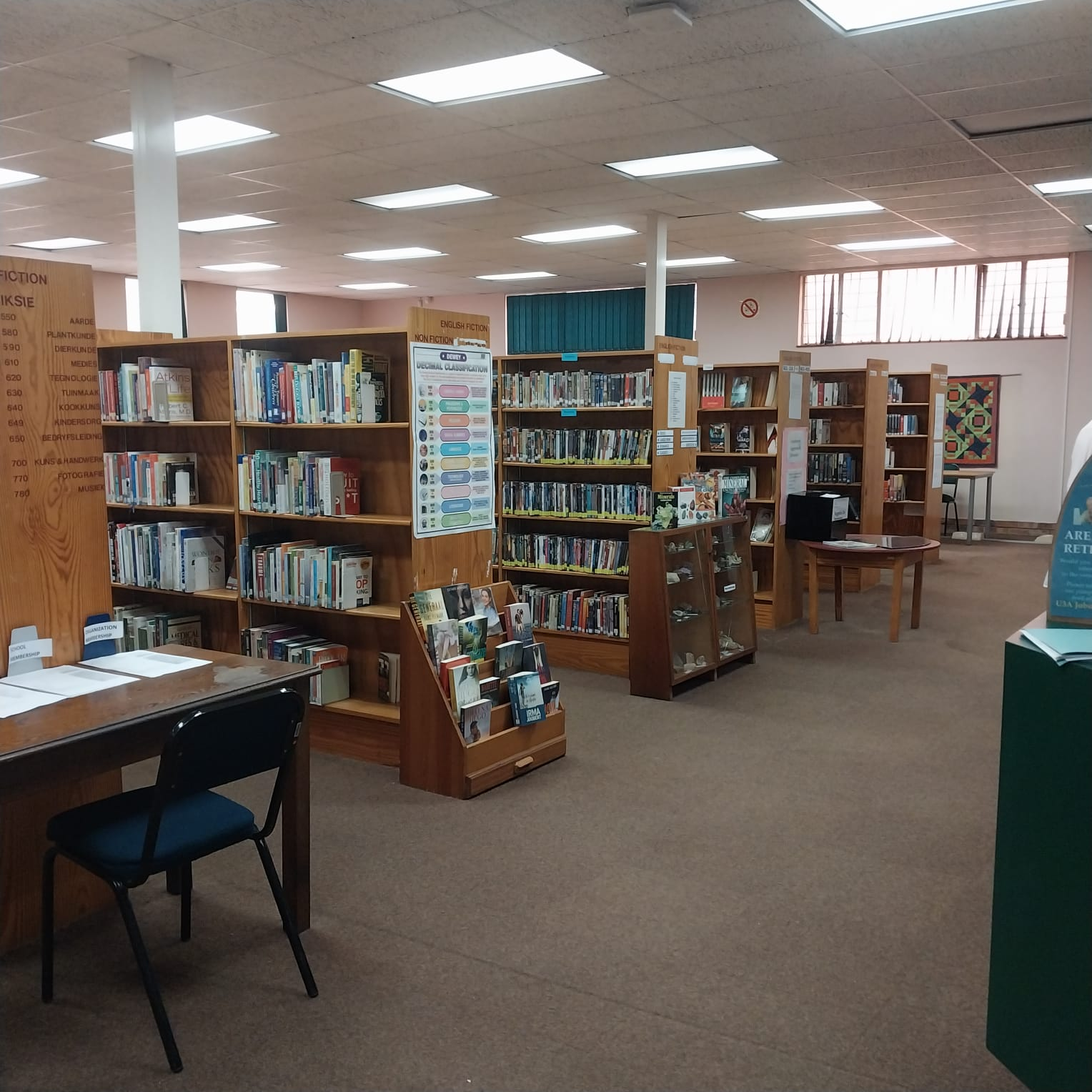
Library book stacks

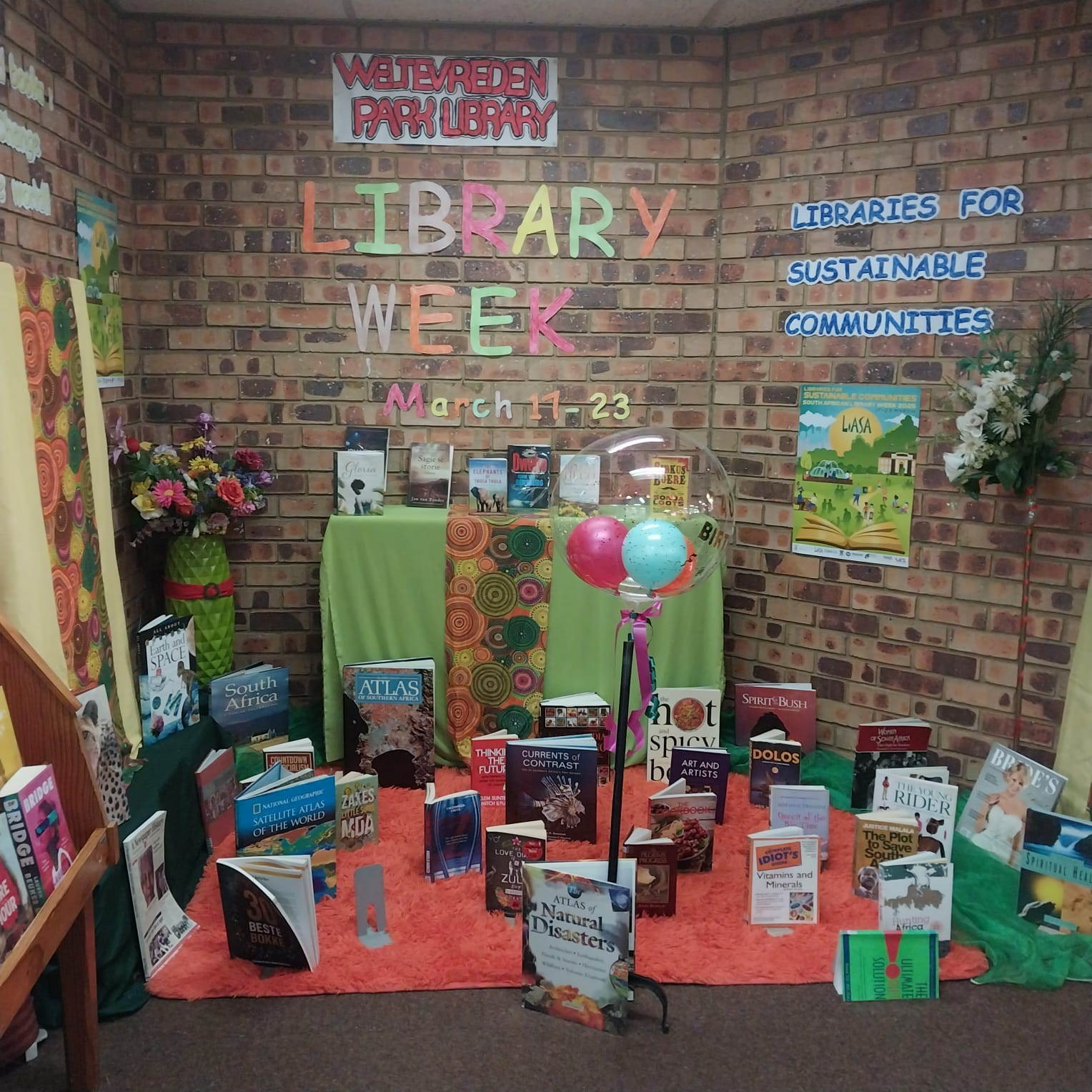
Library display focusing on library week

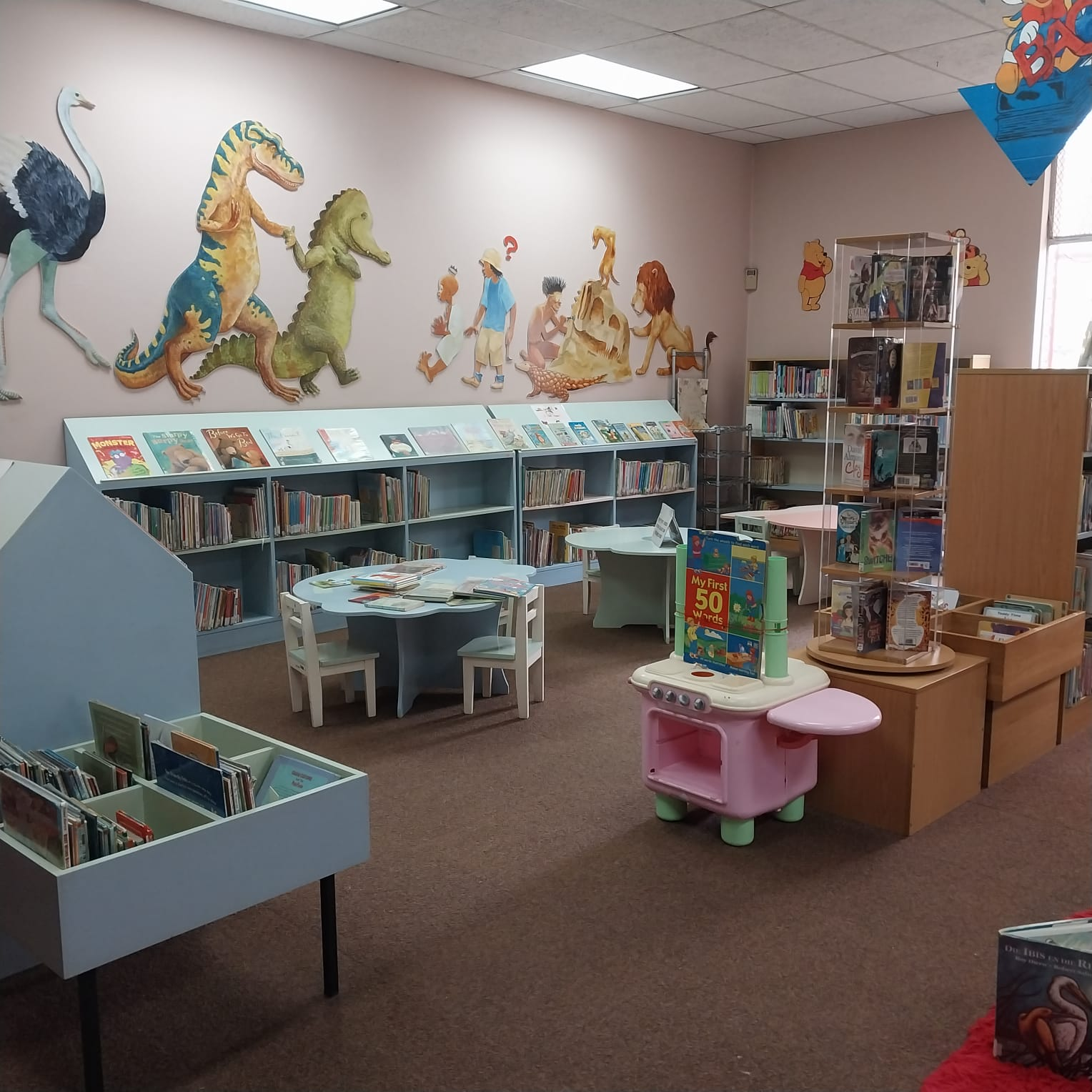
The children’s library, tables, display and books
