= Alexandra Children's Library =

- 26°06′45″N 28°05′25″E
- Location: Alexandra, Johannesburg, Gauteng, South Africa
- Type: Public library

Other information
- Website: www.cojelearning.org.za

The Alexandra Children's Library is located in Alexandra Township in Johannesburg, South Africa. The library began initially in a shipping container. However, this community resource has been transformed into the Alexandra Multi-Purpose Community Centre. The library is located in the heart of Alexandra, a township in the eastern part of Johannesburg. It serves the children and youth of Johannesburg Region E.

== Facilities and services ==
The Alexandra Children's Library offers a range of facilities and services tailored to meet the needs of young readers. These include:

- An extensive book collection: A wide variety of books catering to children of all ages, from picture books for toddlers to novels for young adults
- Reading programs: Regular story time sessions and reading clubs to engage children and encourage regular reading habits
- Educational resources: Access to staff that assist with homework or school projects
- Community events: Hosting of community events, workshops, and educational programs aimed at developing literacy and life skills

== Partnerships and support ==
The library works in partnership with local schools, non-profit organizations, and government entities to maximize its impact. These collaborations help in sourcing books, funding programs, and organizing events that benefit the local youth.
