= University of Pretoria Library Services =

Coordinates: 25°45′18″S 28°13′50″E

- Established: 1908
- Branches: 6

Collection
- Size: 1.522 million volumes

Other information
- Director: Lindiwe Soyizwapi
- Website: University of Pretoria Library

University of Pretoria Library Services serves the students, faculty and researchers of the University of Pretoria. The library of the University of Pretoria is regarded as one of the top university libraries in South Africa. It provides a comprehensive information service for the university's approximately 38 161 undergraduate students, 16 805 postgraduates and 8 843 full-time staff members.

== History ==
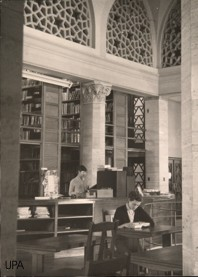
The Old Merensky Library

The original library was initially established and housed in the Old Arts building in 1911 before being relocated to the Old Merensky Library, University of Pretoria. The construction of the Old Merensky Library was made possible through a generous donation of £10 000 by geologist Dr Hans Merensky, as well as donations from the Jewish Community of Pretoria, donations from University staff and students, a contribution from the City Council and an anonymous friend of the University. The cornerstone of the building was laid by General Jan Smuts on 11 October 1937. Despite expansions to the Old Merensky Library, University of Pretoria in 1957, it soon became too small and the firm Lou, Marais, Marquard and Kuhn was appointed in 1969 to design a new library. Construction on the Merensky 2 Library started in November 1971 and the building was inaugurated by the Vice Chancellor, Prof E.M. Hamman on 26 March 1976.

== Libraries ==
The Merensky 2 Library (Main campus library) includes the Learning Centre, Technical Services, a Research Commons, a Digital Scholarship Centre and the following faculty libraries:

- Economic & Management Sciences
- Natural & Agricultural Sciences
- Engineering & Built Environment
- Humanities (incl. Music)
- Theology

The Oliver R Tambo Law Library is housed within the Faculty of Law building on the main campus. The other faculty libraries, which are spread over four different campuses, are the Education Library (Groenkloof), the Mamelodi Library, the Jotello F. Soga Veterinary Science Library (the only Veterinary Science Library in South Africa), and the Health Sciences Library.

In addition to the traditional library services, the Library Services gives access to over 500 000 e-Books; 181 342 e-Journals; 66 248 items on UPSpace (the University's institutional repository); 169 datasets on Figshare data repository, access to 3-D printing in the MakerSpace, Digitisation service, Libby (service robot) for short enquiries, Ask-a-Librarian and Chat to a Librarian (an online reference service); and openUP (a collection of full text research articles published by UP staff, students and affiliates).
