= Sidney Lavis =

Sidney Warren DeLavis (1873 – 1965) was an eminent Anglican clergyman in the 20th century. He was born in 1873, educated at St Augustine's College, Canterbury and ordained in 1899. He was Rector of St Paul’s, Cape Town, then the area’s Archdeacon before his appointment as Dean of Cape Town. In 1931 he was consecrated Coadjutor Bishop of Cape Town.

He died in July 1965.

== Notes ==
Anglican Church of Southern Africa titles
Preceded by Laurence Parsons	Dean of Cape Town; 1928– 1932	Succeeded by John Brooke
Preceded by James Okey Nash	Suffragan Bishop of Cape Town; 1931– 1957	Succeeded by Roy Walter Frederick Cowdry
Preceded by Oswald James Hogarth	Archdeacon of Cape Town; 1932– 1957	Succeeded by Roy Walter Frederick Cowdry
