= Laurence Parsons =

Laurence or Lawrence Parsons may refer to:

- Sir Laurence Parsons, 3rd Baronet (1708–1756), Anglo-Irish politician
- Laurence Parsons, 1st Earl of Rosse (1749–1807), Irish peer and politician
- Lawrence Parsons, 2nd Earl of Rosse (1758–1841), Irish peer
- Lawrence Parsons, 4th Earl of Rosse (1840–1908), Irish peer
- Lawrence Michael Parsons, 6th Earl of Rosse (1906–1979), Irish peer
- Laurence Parsons (priest) (1883–1972), Anglican clergyman & grandson of the 3rd Earl of Rosse
- Lawrence Parsons (British Army officer) (1850–1923), British general
- Lawrence Parsons (judge) (died 1628), English-born barrister, judge and politician in Ireland
- Laurence Parsons (MP), member of parliament (MP) elected 1659 from Boroughbridge
