= John Brooke (priest) =

British-South African clergyman

Dean of Cape Town
- In office 1932-1947

Personal details
- Born: June 10, 1873; Clanwilliam, Cape Colony (present-day South Africa)
- Died: June 10, 1951 (aged 78)
- Spouse(s): Helen Buchanan (m. 1910; died 1911) Audrey Currey (m. 1918)
- Children: 3
- Parent: Richard Brooke (father)
- Relatives: Henry Currey (father-in-law)
- Education: University of the Cape of Good Hope; Keble College, Oxford; Cuddesdon Theological College

John Charles Herries Brooke (June 10, 1873 – June 10, 1951) was Dean of Cape Town from 1932 to 1947.

== Early years ==
Brooke was born in Clanwilliam, Cape Colony, the son of the Reverend Richard Brooke, rector of Clanwilliam (and afterwards archdeacon of the Cape), and his wife, Mary Sophia Bourhill.

Educated at the Diocesan College in Rondebosch (“Bishops”) (1887-1894), he graduated as a BA of the University of the Cape of Good Hope (1894), then continued his education at Keble College, Oxford (second class, theology schools, and BA, 1897; MA, 1900) and at Cuddesdon Theological College (1897).

He was made deacon in the Church of England by William Stubbs, the bishop of Oxford in 1898 and ordained priest in 1899.

== Clerical career ==
Brooke began his career as a curate at Henley-on-Thames in the Diocese of Oxford. He thereafter returned to South Africa and was licensed successively as an itinerating priest (from September 1901) and as precentor and assistant curate of St. George’s Cathedral (from November 1904) and was instituted as rector of St. Paul’s, Rondebosch (from September 1911; served until 1925), all in the Anglican Diocese of Cape Town. He also found time to serve as editor of The Cape Church Monthly and Parish Record between 1905 and 1911. Following the outbreak of World War I he served briefly as a chaplain to the 2nd Battalion, Imperial Light Horse and the 3rd Mounted Brigade, “D” Force in German South-West Africa. In 1923 he was made examining chaplain to William Carter, the then archbishop of Cape Town and in 1925 was made honorary canon of St. George’s Cathedral. He left the Diocese of Cape Town in 1925 to serve as rector of St. Aidan’s, Yeoville, in the Diocese of Johannesburg.

Brooke was invited back to the Diocese of Cape Town in 1932 to serve as dean of Cape Town, rector of St. George’s Cathedral and archdeacon of Cape Town, where he remained until his retirement from full-time ministry in 1947. (Note: He was given a general licence by the archbishop of Cape Town, Russell Darbyshire on 3 January 1948.) He was formally licensed as an honorcCanon of St George's Cathedral in July 1950.

He was admitted as a chaplain of the Venerable Order of the Hospital of St. John of Jerusalem in May 1946, and invested as such at an investiture held in Cape Town on 16 April 1948.

== Assessment ==
Brooke was “a man of sincere Christian conviction and devout life, he possessed a strong character and a vivid sense of humour. He was also an outstanding sportsman and in his youth played Currie Cup rugby for Western Province.”

== Family ==
Brooke was married in 1910 to Helen Mary Buchanan, the daughter of the Hon. Mr Justice James Buchanan and his wife, Amy St. Leger Bertram Gordon. Mrs Brooke died in Cape Town on 26 March 1911.

He was married, secondly, on 23 April 1918, by the Archbishop of Cape Town, to Audrey Mary Currey, the daughter of the Hon. Henry Latham Currey, of Pinewood, Rondebosch. The second Mrs Brooke, who was the author of the book, Robert Gray First Bishop of Cape Town (1947), died on 1 June 1985.

He had three daughters, one by his first marriage and two by his second.

== Notes ==
- de Villiers, A. W. (1998). Messengers, Watchmen and Stewards. University of the Witwatersrand. ISBN 978-1-86838-220-0.
- Drennan, Basil St. George (1970). The Keble College centenary register 1870-1970. Keble College.

Anglican Church of Southern Africa titles
Preceded by Sidney Warren Lavis	Dean of Cape Town; 1932–1947	Succeeded by Michael McCausland Gibbs
