= Tony Holiday =

Tony Holiday may refer to:

- Tony Holiday (musician), German singer-songwriter
- Tony Holiday (journalist), South African activist, journalist and philosopher
