= Anthony Holiday =

South African journalist (1940–2006)

- Born: 6 November 1940; Cape Town, South Africa
- Died: 10 July 2006 (aged 65); Cape Town, South Africa
- Other name: Tony
- Education: St. Joseph's Marist College; University of South Africa; Oxford University
- Occupation: Journalist Activist Philosopher
- Known for: Anti-apartheid activism and journalism

Anthony “Tony” Holiday was a South African journalist, activist, academic and philosopher. Holiday was best known for his work as a journalist and anti-apartheid activism. In his philosophical work Holiday was known as expert on the Austrian philosopher Ludwig Wittgenstein.

Holiday was born into a devout Catholic family in Cape Town, South Africa. Although he attended high school at St. Joseph's Marist College in Rondebosch he was unable to complete his secondary education due to an early childhood injury. He attended a weekly gathering of mostly Catholic intellectuals where he met and befriended Professor Martin Versfeld.

Versfeld recognised his intellectual talents; writing Holiday a letter of recommendation which help him secure a job as a junior reporter at the Cape Times in 1965. He was later recruited as a reporter for The Rand Daily Mail.

During his time as a journalist Holiday was a member of the South African Communist Party (SACP) and the African National Congress (ANC). In 1976 he was arrested by the apartheid authorities and charged under the Terrorism Act for accepting funds from the ANC and SACP, being trained by the ANC in subversive activities, organizing an underground cell, and producing propaganda. He was sentenced to six years in prison, being detained for a total of seven years, during which he did a correspondence course through the University of South Africa. After his release he moved to the United Kingdom where, with the assistance of ANC contacts, he enrolled in the University of Oxford to do his doctorate in philosophy on Wittgenstein.

Following the end of apartheid in 1994 Holiday returned to South Africa, left the SACP, and became an academic, teaching philosophy at the University of the Western Cape until his retirement in 2005. Holiday died from cancer on 10 July 2006.
