= Rondebosch Fountain =

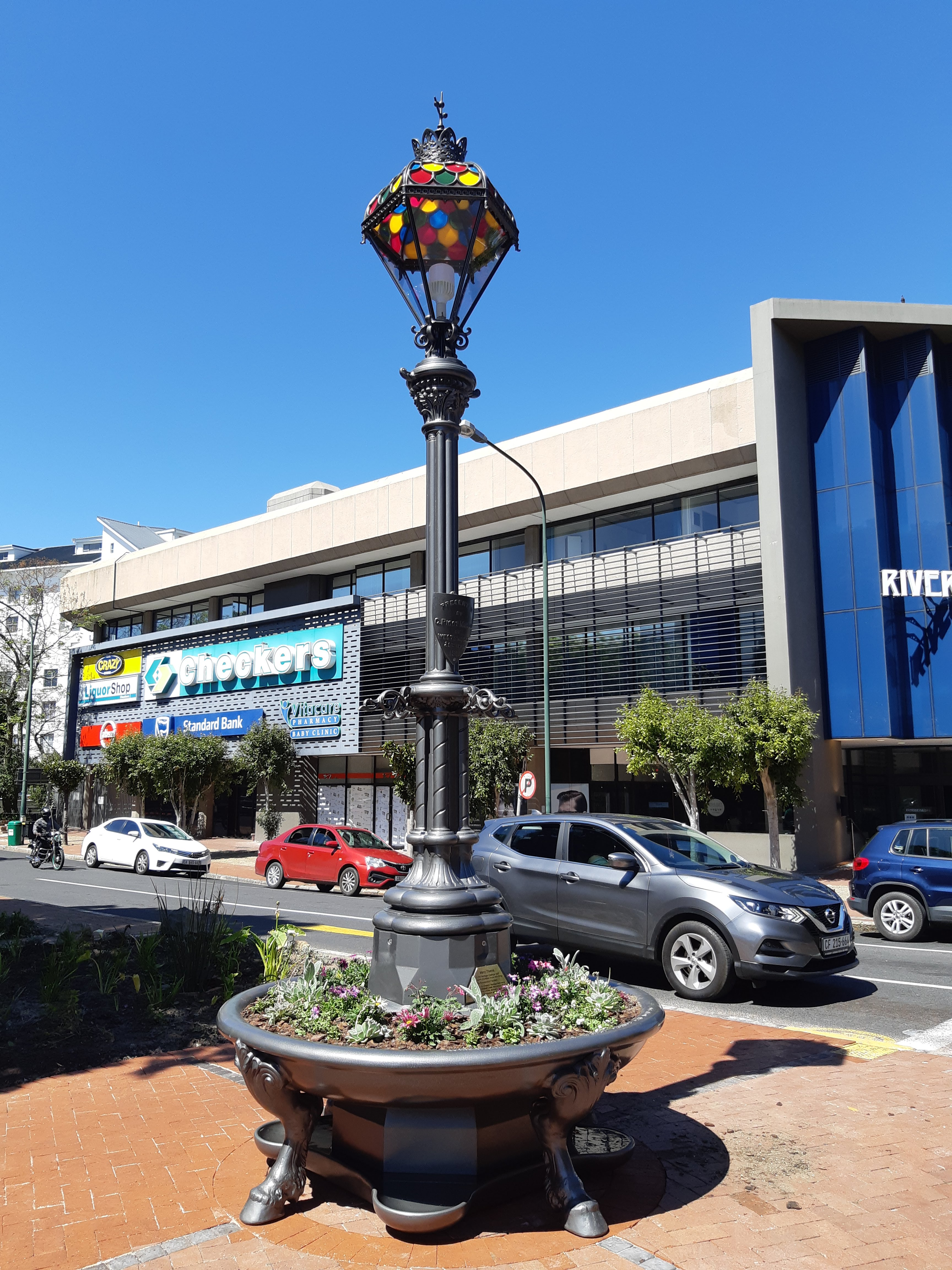
- The replacement fountain shortly after it was installed in 2020
- Location: Rondebosch, Cape Town, South Africa
- Coordinates: 33°57′41.2″S 18°28′12.3″E
- Area: 5 metres (16 ft)
- Height: 4 m (13 ft)
- Built: 1891, 2020

Rondebosch Fountain is an ornamental Victorian drinking trough for horses, standing on a traffic island on the intersection between Belmont Road and Main Road in the centre of Rondebosch in Cape Town, South Africa. It was declared a National Monument on 10 April 1964.

Originally known as the Moodie Fountain, the fountain was made of cast iron in 1891 and consisted of a circular drinking trough supported on horses' legs, with a central post topped with a hexagonal lantern. Four decorated brackets may have originally suspended cups for people to drink from the spouting water, while horses drank from the trough, and dogs from smaller basins at ground level.

It was cast by Walter Macfarlane & Co. at the Saracen Foundry in Glasgow, Scotland, and presented to the community by George Pigot Moodie in 1891. The lantern was not South Africa's first electric streetlight. It was first turned on on 25 April 1892, almost 10 years after streetlights in Kimberley were turned on. Initially powered by Moodie's private power plant until a municipal power plant on the Liesbeek River was completed.

The original cast iron fountain was destroyed in August 2015 when a speeding car smashed into it, and some of the pieces were stolen. The fountain was rebuilt in aluminium by local company Heritage Castings. The rebuilt fountain was installed on the 24 September 2020.

== Gallery ==
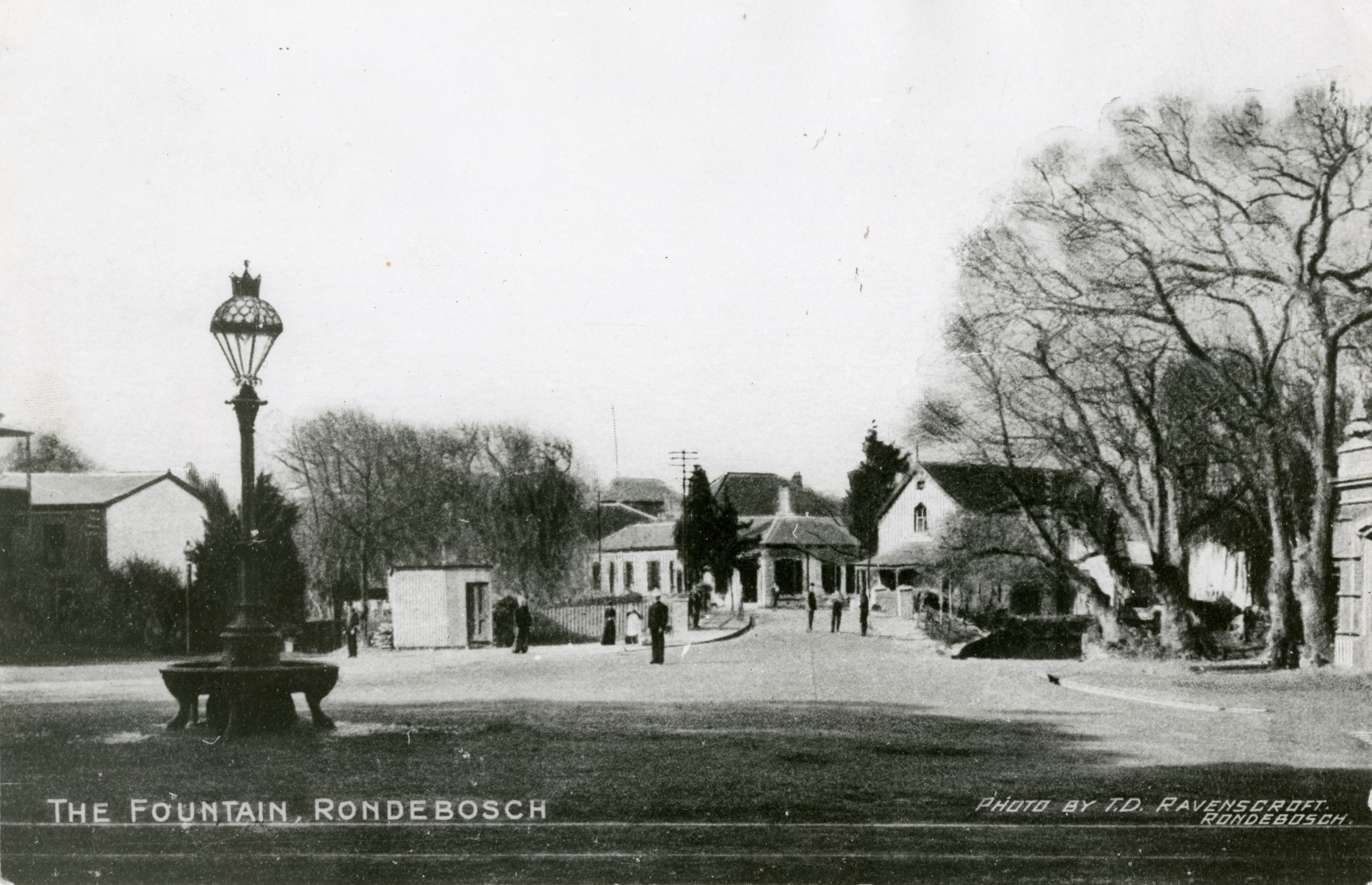
A street scene of Main Road Rondebosch, Cape Town around the turn of the 20th century. The recently installed Rondebosch Fountain can be seen to the left in the foreground.

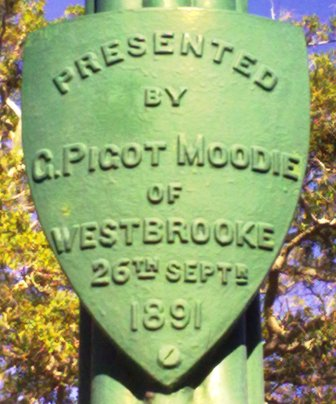

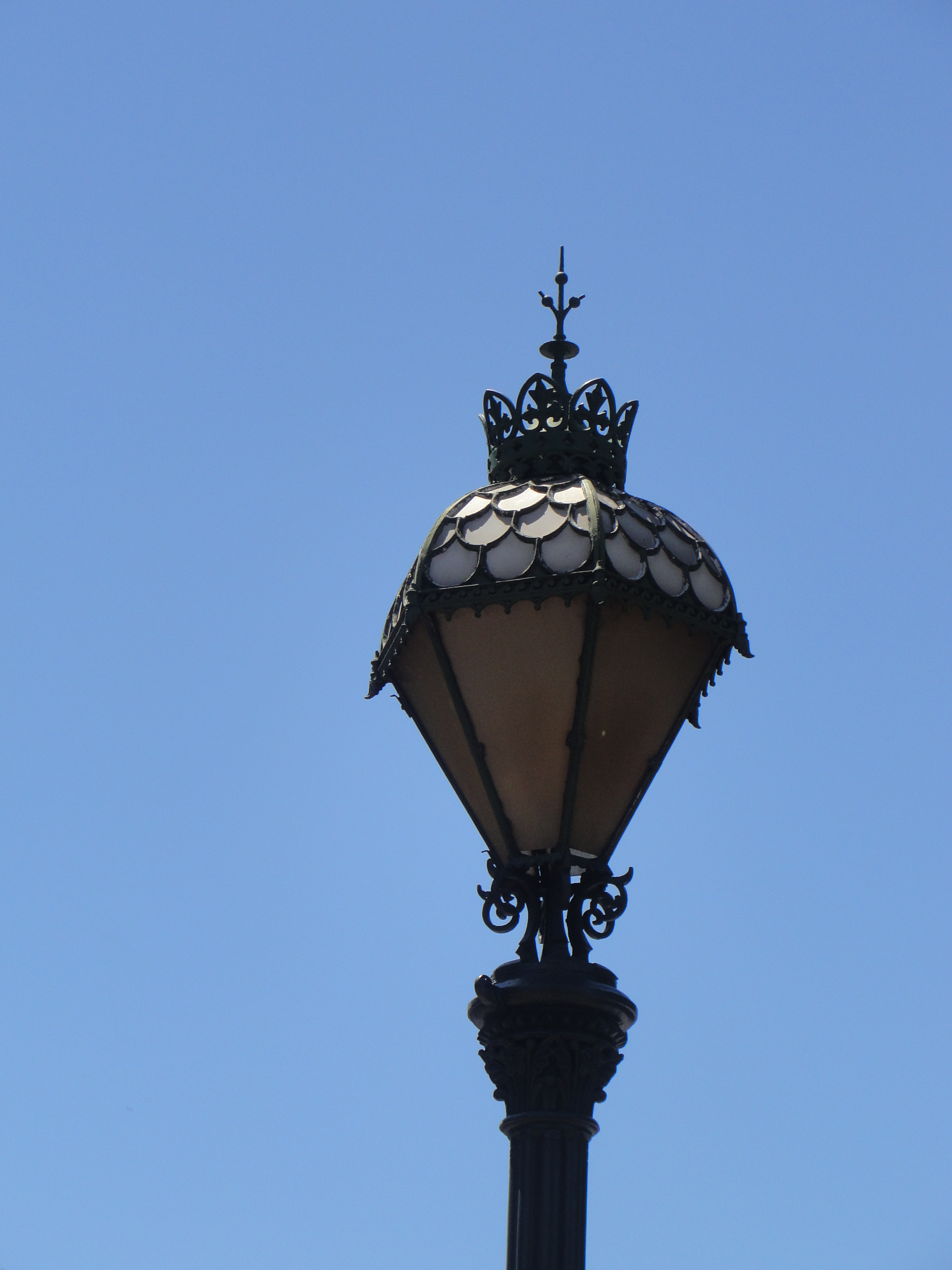

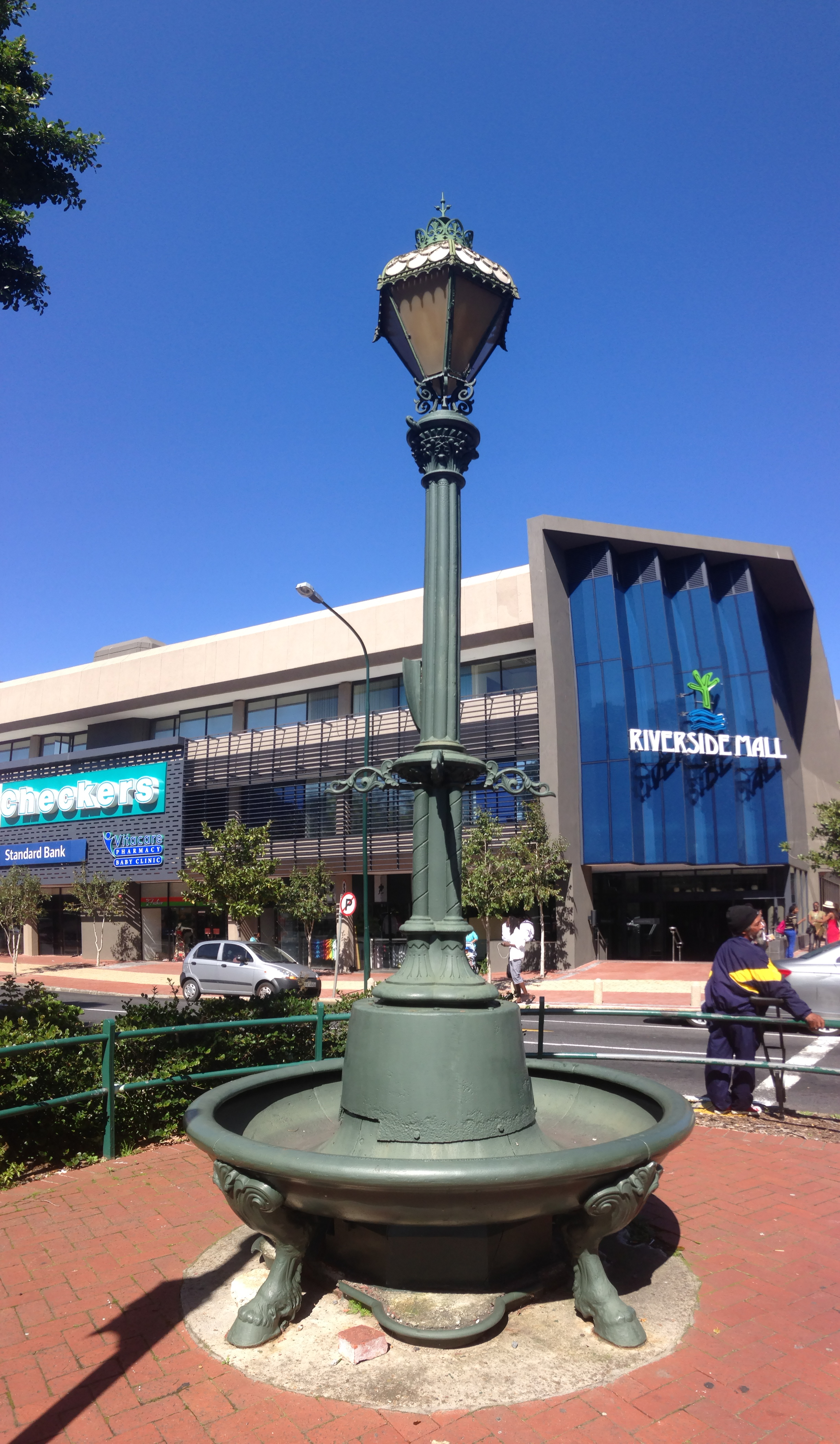
A photograph of the original fountain a few years before it was accidentally destroyed.

== Similar fountains ==
The Fountain was listed as Water Trough number 27 in the Macfarlane's Castings Catalogue, Sixth edition, vol. 2.

Two similar fountains manufactured at Saracen Foundry to the same design exist in South Africa: one in the neighbouring suburb of Rosebank, but without the horses' legs, and one in Cradock in the Eastern Cape, now without the original hexagonal lantern. A cast iron fountain with a similar but simpler design stands in Jubilee Square, Simon's Town. Other fountains to the same design include the Adye Douglas Water Trough in Australia, the Racedo Fountain in Argentina on Boulevard Racedo in front of the railway station in Paraná, Entre Ríos, and the Coronation Fountain in Loanhead, Scotland, dismantled in 1933.

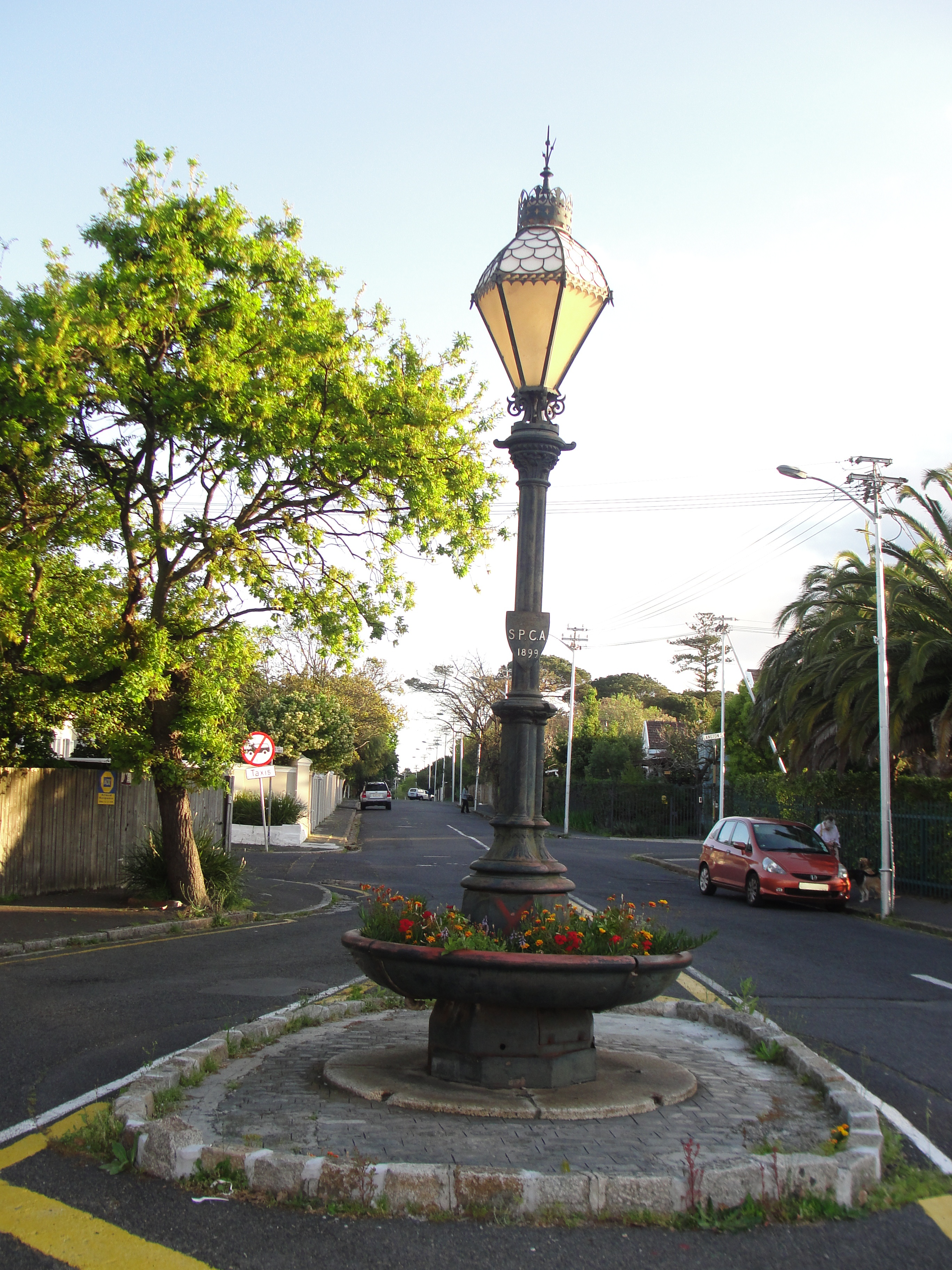
Rosebank Fountain

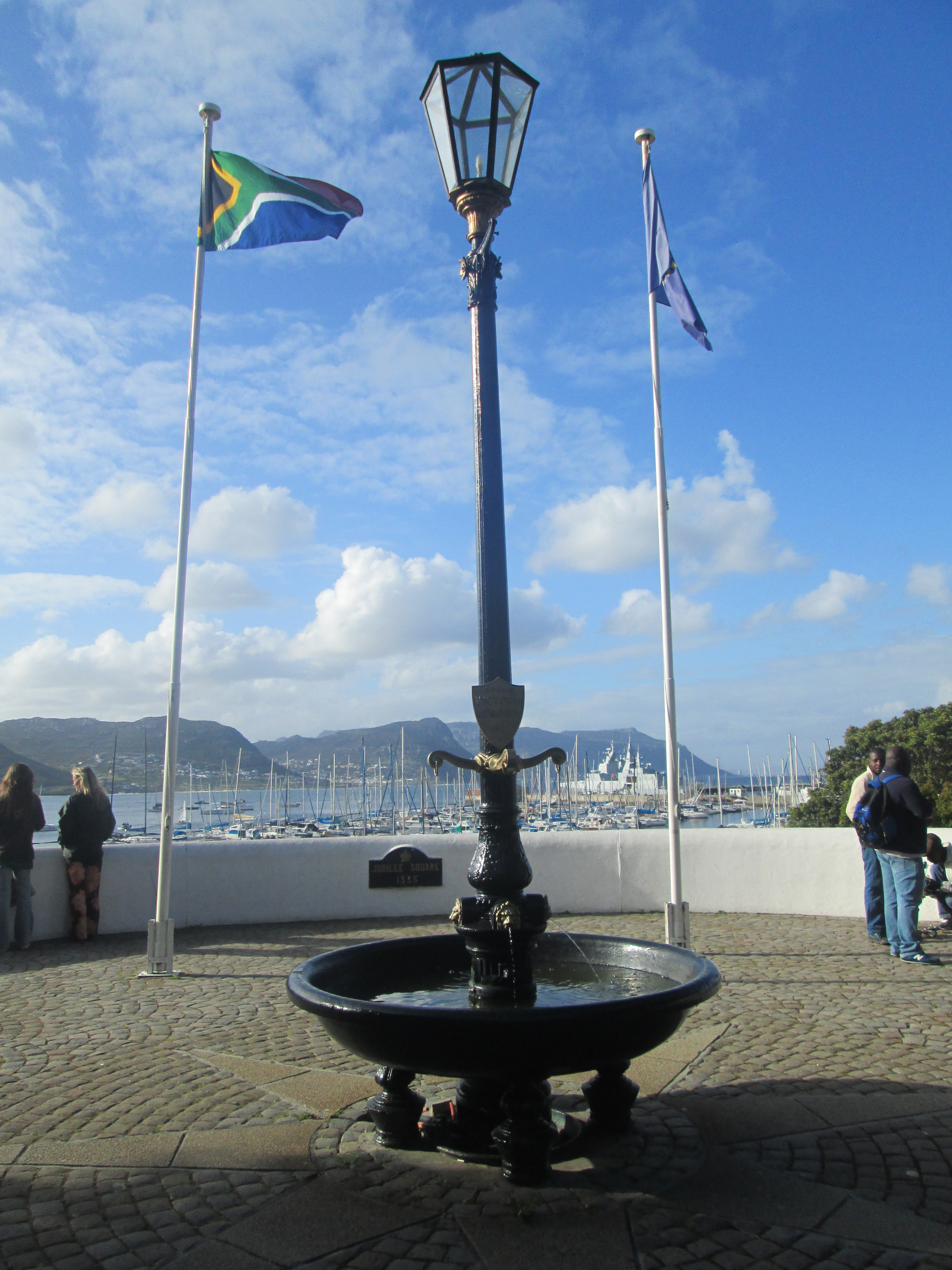
Queen Victoria Fountain

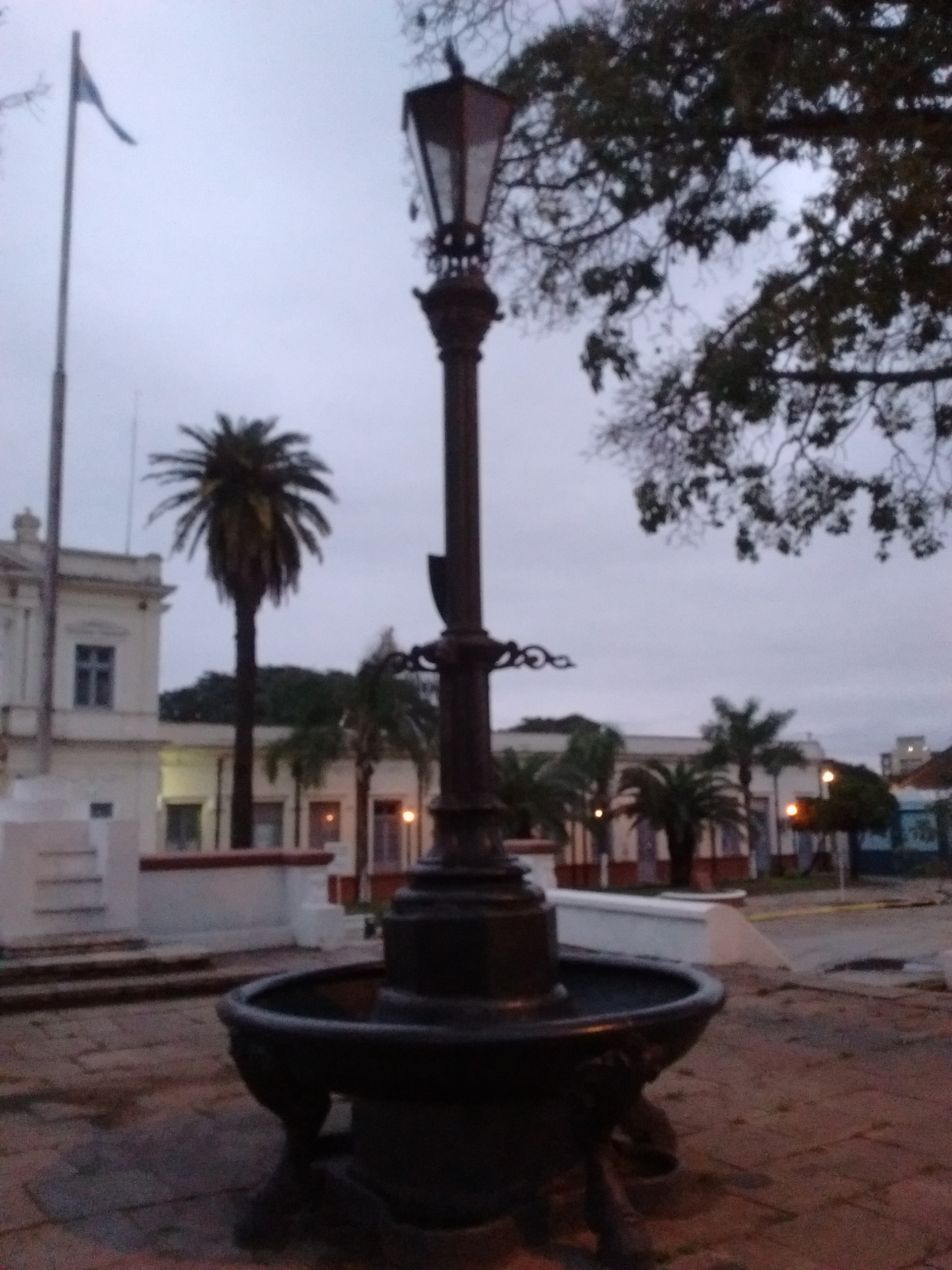
Fountain in Paraná Entre Ríos Argentina

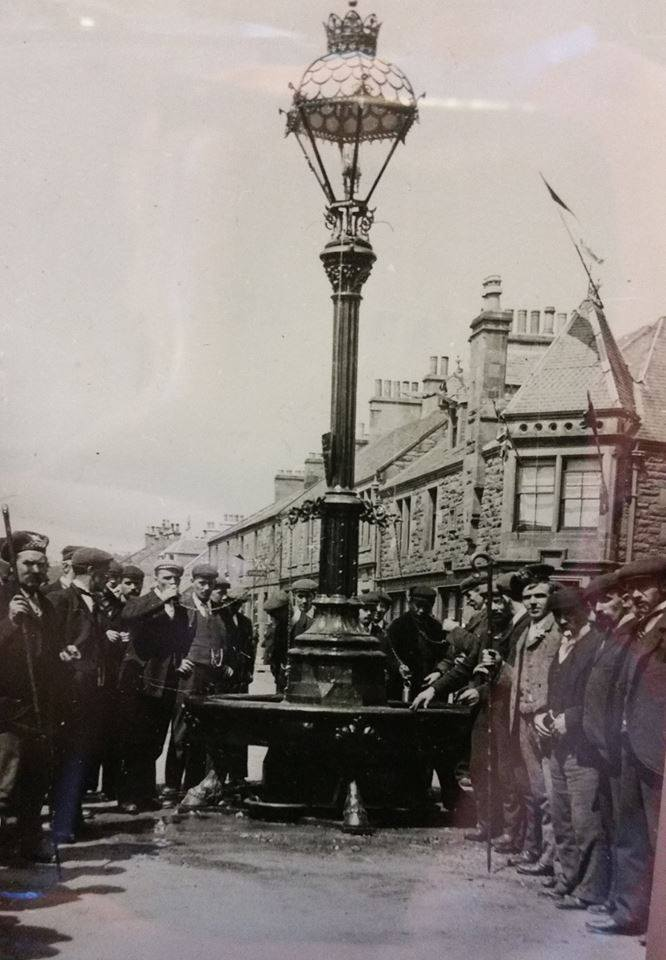
Coronation Fountain

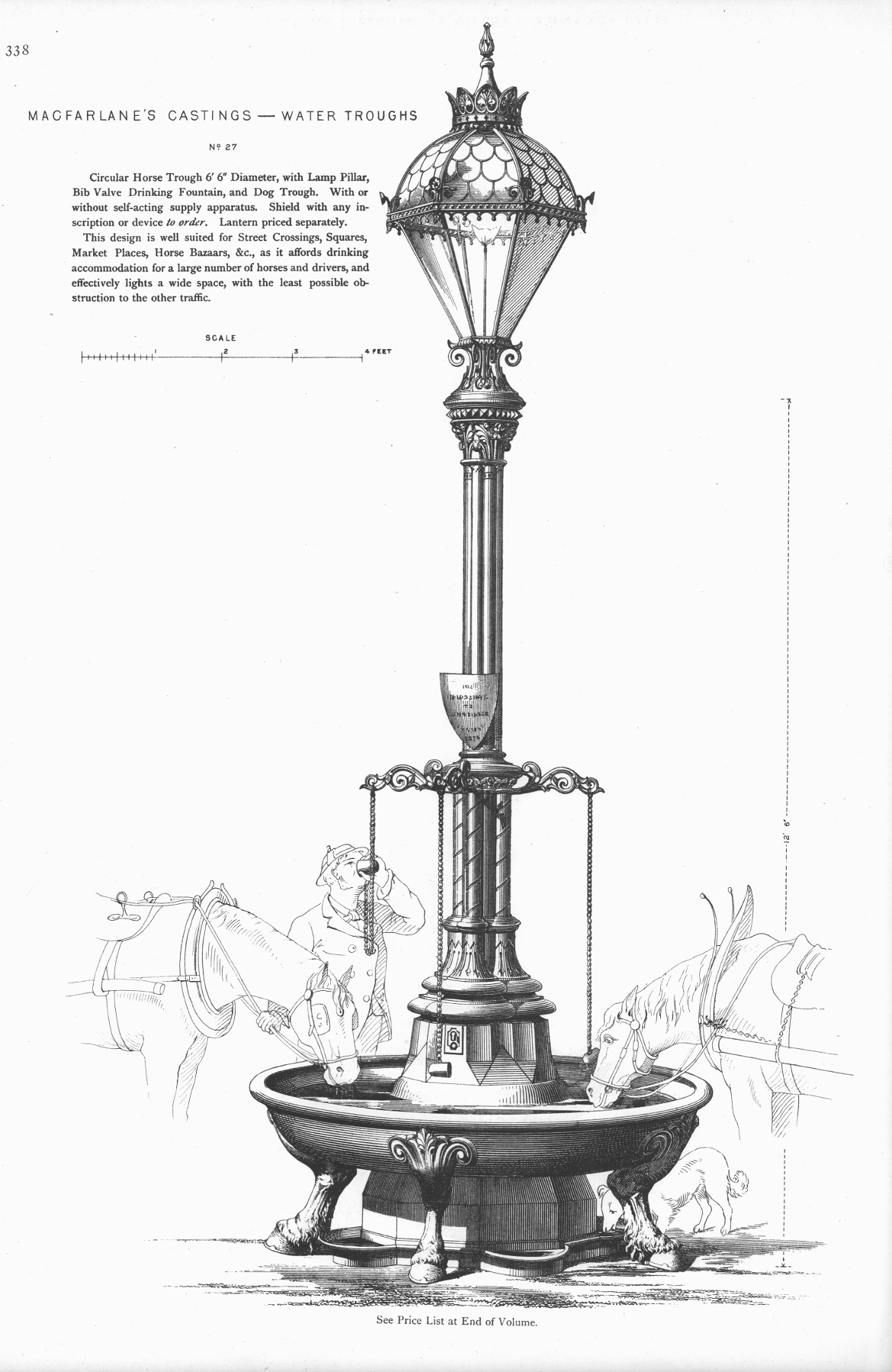
Walter McFarlane catalogue pattern number 27

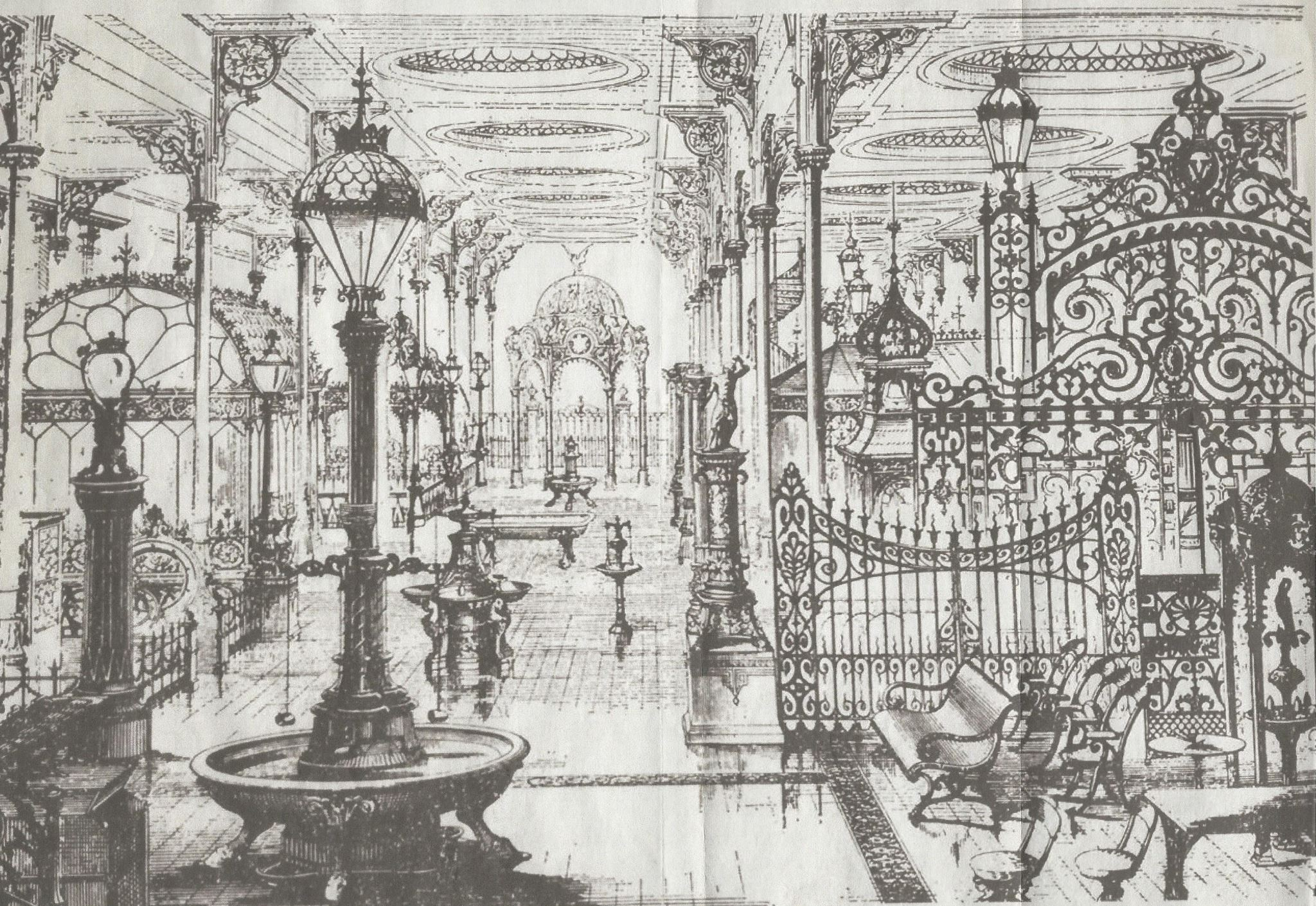
Saracen Foundry showroom
