= Rondebosch Library =

Public library in Cape Town

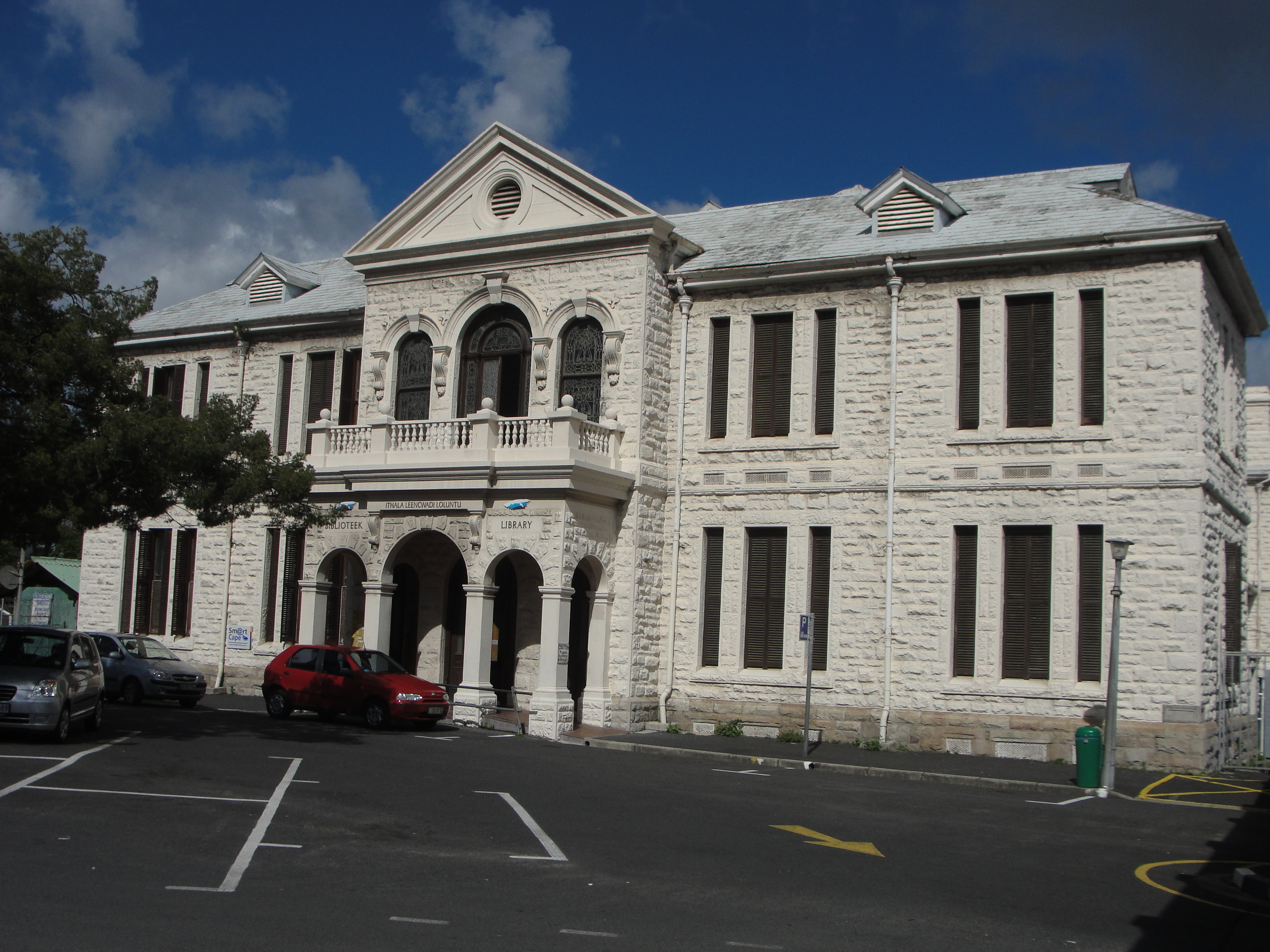
- 33°57′41″S 18°28′19″E
- Location: Town Hall, Hall Road, Rondebosch, Cape Town, 7700, South Africa
- Type: Public Library
- Branch of: City of Cape Town Library and Information Services

Rondebosch Library is a public library in Rondebosch, Cape Town, South Africa. It was ranked 18th in the City of Cape Town's top circulating libraries in 2013. The library's holdings can be searched online via the City of Cape Town's Open Public Access Catalogue (OPAC).

== Rondebosch Town Hall ==
The library is housed in the former Rondebosch Town Hall. The main library is situated in the hall itself, which is no longer used for public meetings, as well as on the stage and in two side rooms, while the children's section is housed upstairs and on the balcony. The building was designed by George Murray Alexander and completed in 1899. In addition to a large public hall with a roof over 10m high, a stage and balcony, the building was designed to hold municipal offices, a public library and refreshment rooms. The building is made of rough stone, which has been painted a dull beige, and has high teak doorways and a teak staircase. A stained glass window above the doors onto the portico balcony depicts the Rondebosch municipal crest, and a view of Devil's Peak and the Rondebosch area. The original portico over the front doors became unsafe and was demolished, and rebuilt after 1969.

== Renovations ==
In July 2018, Rondebosch Library was closed to the public due to required renovations of the roof and library infrastructure.

The Library re-opened its doors to the public on Wednesday, 28 July 2021.

== Gallery ==
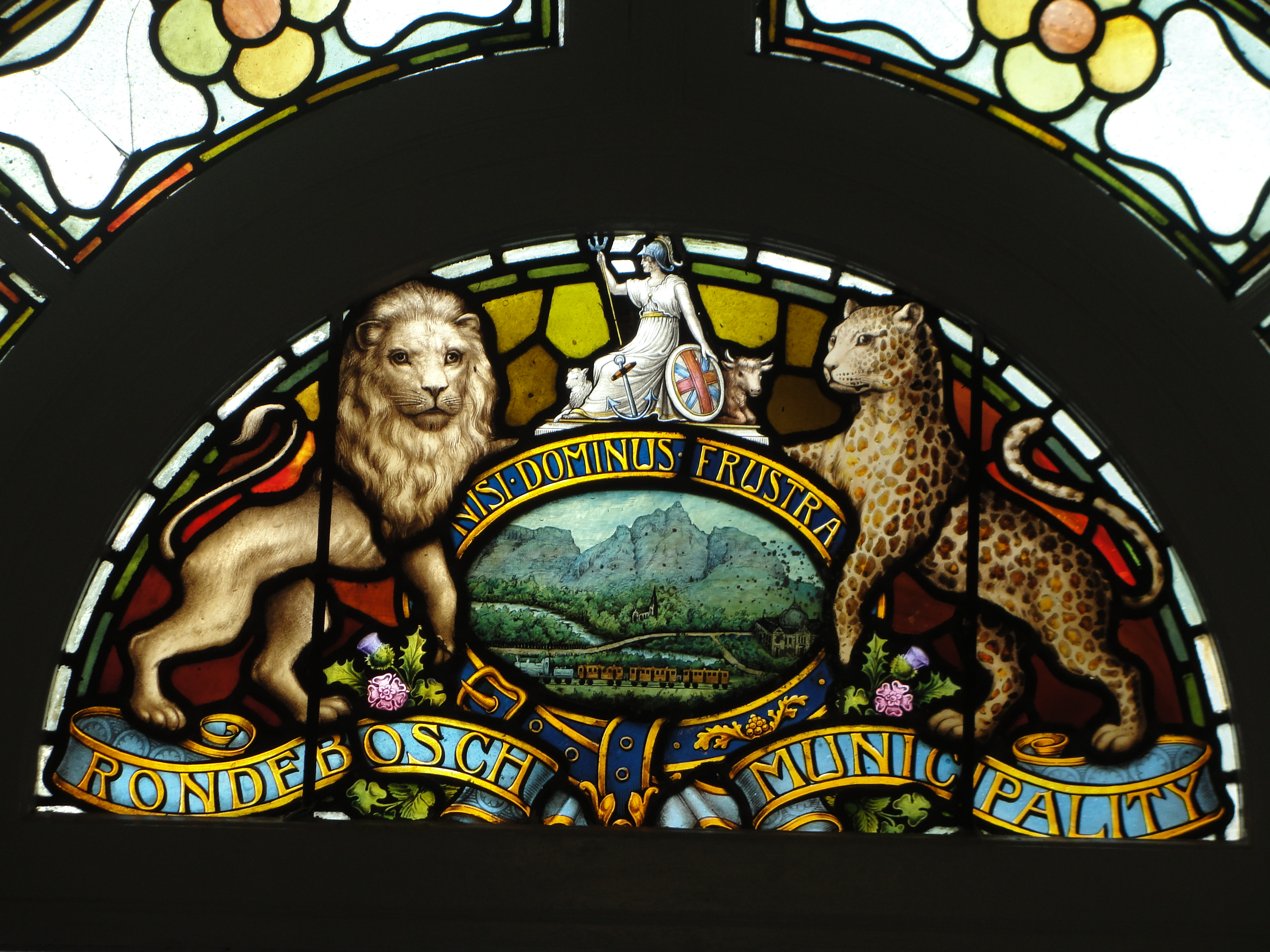
Stained glass window at Rondebosch Town Hall. The Latin motto below reads "nisi dominus frustra" ("Without the Lord, [all is] in vain").

== See also ==
- Fish Hoek Library
- University of Cape Town Libraries
