= Cecil Rolt =

Cecil Henry Rolt was an Anglican clergyman in the first half of the 20th century.

He was born into an ecclesiastical family in 1865 and educated at Winchester and New College, Oxford. Ordained in 1888, he held curacies at St Thomas’s Sunderland, Christ Church West Hartlepool, St Hilda’s South Shields and St Cuthbert’s Bensham before becoming Vicar of Holy Trinity Church, Darlington. He later held further incumbencies in Batley and Huddersfield before his appointment as Dean of Cape Town. He died on 14 September 1926

== Notes ==
Anglican Church of Southern Africa titles
Preceded by Charles Theophilus Headley	Dean of Cape Town; 1917– 1924	Succeeded by Laurence Parsons
