= St. Joseph's Marist College =

Catholic school in Cape Town, Western Cape, South Africa

Location
- Belmont Rd, Rondebosch; Cape Town, Western Cape; South Africa
- Coordinates: 33.958735°S 18.47529°E

Information
- School type: Independent
- Established: February 1918; 108 years ago
- Grades: K–12
- Gender: All gender
- Age: 3 to 21
- Enrollment: 528+ pupils
- Language: English
- Schedule: 07:30 - 16:00
- Campus: Urban Campus
- Campus type: Suburban
- Website: www.maristsj.co.za/st-josephs

St. Joseph's Marist College is an independent English medium co-educational Catholic school situated in the suburb of Rondebosch in Cape Town in the Western Cape province of South Africa. It comprises both a kindergarten, primary and secondary school offering education to children and young people from the age of three up until 21.

The schools origins began with its establishment on 6 May 1867 by the Marist Brothers institute of brothers of the Catholic Church.

The school moved to is current location at the Belmont Estate in February 1918, increasing the schools capacity to above 100 students. In 1933 the nearby St Joseph's Academy was incorporated into St Joseph's College and a chapel was completed in 1936. Further expansions tool place in the 1960s.

In 1978 the school elected to de-racialise itself, contrary to the apartheid policies of the day. The early 1980s saw a decline in enrolments that almost resulted in the closure of the school. The situation was reversed with the assistance of the school's alumni. The school expanded further in the 1990s and in the 2000s a Montessori Teacher Training Centre was established.

== Notable alumni ==
- Anthony Holiday, activist, journalist, and academic
- Owen McCann, Catholic cardinal
- Herschelle Gibbs, cricketer
- Gordon Mulholland, actor
- JM Coetzee, Nobel prize winning novelist
