= Keurboom Park =

Park in Rondebosch, Cape Town, South Africa

Coordinates: 33.973064°S 18.478039°E

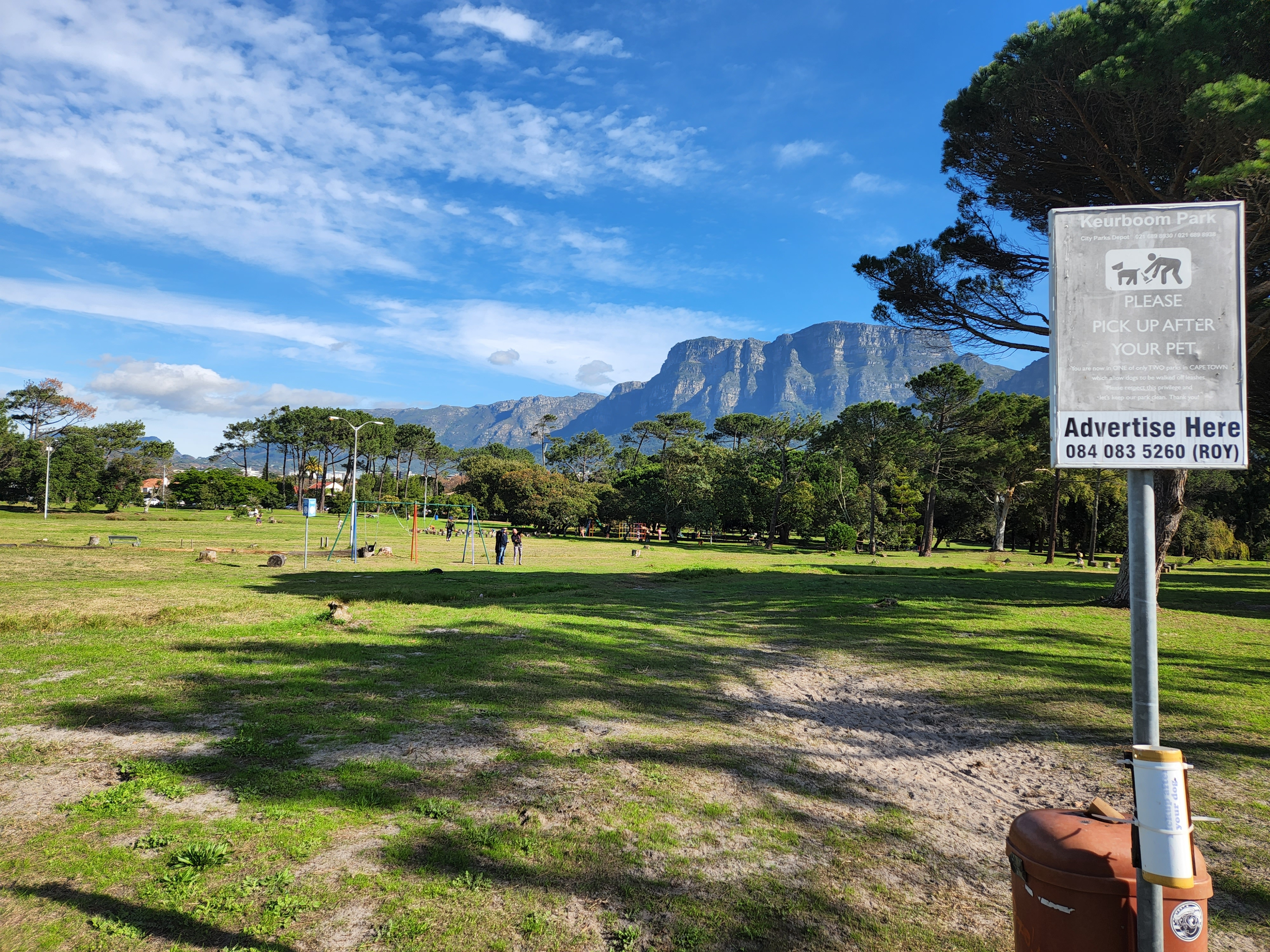
- A view of Keurboom Park (Squirrels Way), Cape Town. Table Mountain is visible in the background
- Interactive map of Keurboom Park
- Location: Rondebosch, Cape Town 7708 South Africa
- Operator: Keurboom Park Association; City of Cape Town
- Status: Open all year

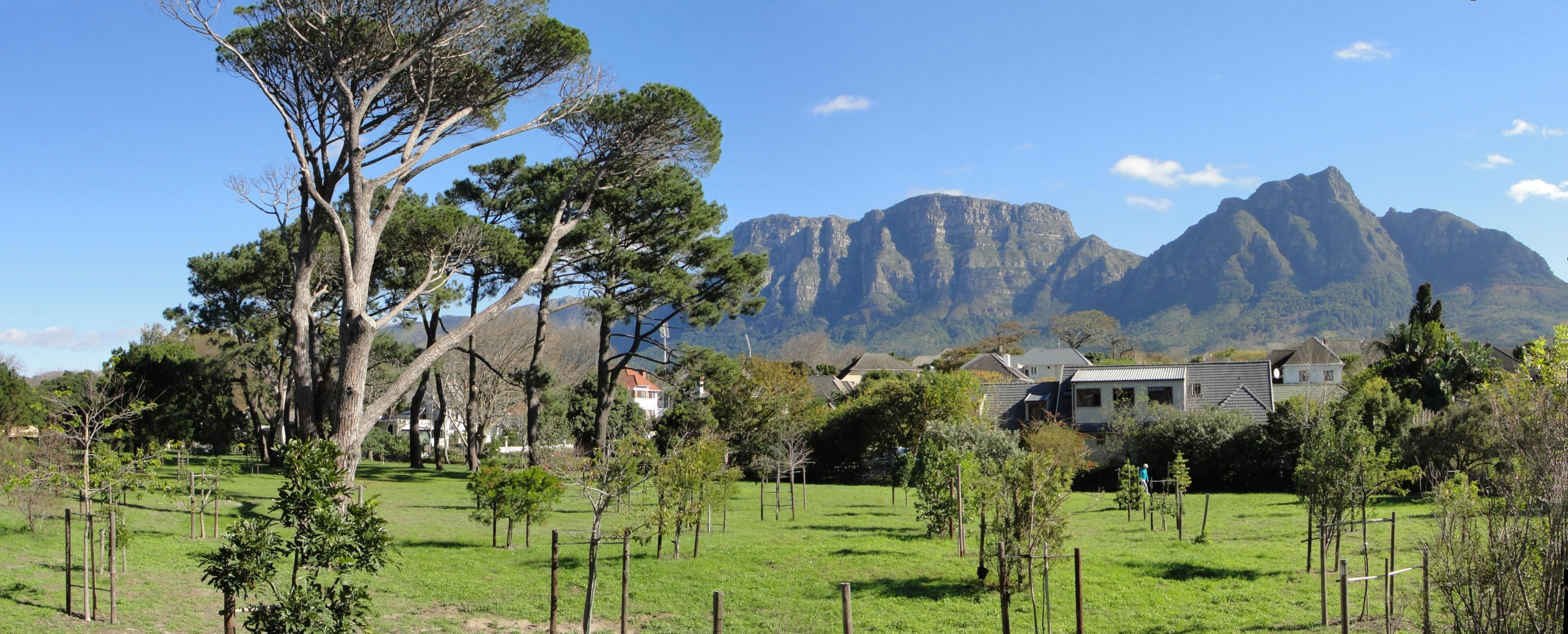
Keurboom Park in Rondebosch

Keurboom Park is a park in Rondebosch, Cape Town, in South Africa. It borders the Western Province Cricket Club and Rondebosch Boys' High School. It is named after the original Keurboom estate. It has two children's play areas within it, in addition to open air exercise equipment, dog friendly open areas, and ponds and streams for local wildlife. This includes a seasonal frog and dog pond. It is locally known for its sweeping views of Table Mountain, and for being a child and dog friendly park.

The keurboom is an indigenous tree known for its very fast growth and pink flowers. In 2003 a planting program to plant keurboom trees in the park began with the planting of twelve trees on Arbor Day. By 2007 over 200 trees had been planted.

Since 2019 the park has hosted an annual family market in November.

The park hosted the 2012 African Cross Country Championships with races ranging from 6 to 12 km (3.7 to 7.5 mi).
