= Oswald Hogarth =

The Ven. Oswald James Hogarth, MA (1874–1961) was archdeacon of The Cape from 1927 to 1932.

Hogarth was educated at the Diocesan College, Cape Town and Christ Church, Oxford; and ordained deacon in 1898 and priest in 1899. After curacies in Battersea and Rondebosch he became Rector of Salt River. From 1919 to 1922 he was a Diocesan School Inspector in Oxford. Returning to South Africa, he served further incumbencies in Cape Town and Kalk Bay before he became Archdeacon; and at Severn Stoke in England afterwards.

He died on 21 August 1961.
