= Harold Arthur Morris =

Harold Arthur Morris (1884–1977) was the fifth person to be awarded the Freedom of the City of Kimberley, South Africa, an honour conferred in 1967 in recognition of outstanding services to the City and the Northern Cape. Morris was born in Rondebosch, Cape Town, on 4 May 1884 and died in Kimberley aged 93 on 3 June 1977.

== Early life and education ==
H.A. Morris was the second of three sons of the Revd Henry Elliott Morris, who was the head of the Diocesan College Preparatory School and afterwards an Honorary Canon of St. George's Cathedral, Cape Town. The three boys grew up with their parents at Feldhausen ('The Grove') in Claremont and at Bishops (Diocesan College). Morris's elder brother, Edward, an attorney at Nqamakwe, Transkei, died during the 1918 influenza epidemic, while the youngest of the siblings, Hugh, as a medical graduate from Edinburgh and a fine artist, who rose to the rank of captain in the Great War, was killed by a sniper behind enemy lines in 1915 while sketching enemy positions.

Morris was educated at Diocesan College, 1893–1901, and began an engineering career in Cape Town in 1902. As a qualified journeyman in 1907 he helped install a Pelton wheel hydro electric scheme in the Hex River Valley, and the first 2 200 Volt high tension switchboard at the Dock Road Power Station for Cape Government Railways. Subsequently, joining the staff of the English-owned "Koffyfontein Mine Ltd", he went to the Free State mining town of Koffiefontein in 1909. In 1912, he qualified as an engineer, being awarded Certificate No 11 which, in 1967, was the oldest valid professional engineering certificate in South Africa.

== World War I ==
With the outbreak of World War I Morris volunteered for service, first in local hostilities when he joined Cullinan's Horse, a mounted unit forming part of a surprise "Eastern Force" for an intended cross-desert attack on the German rear in South West Africa (the Germans had surrendered, however, by the time the force reached its destination). He then worked his passage to England, as a Third Engineer in S.S. Galway Castle, and joined the Royal Engineers. As a Sergeant he took a searchlight contingent to the front. Commissioned in 1918 as 2nd Lieutenant, No 5 Anti Aircraft Searchlight Section, H.A. Morris was awarded a Military Cross "for continuous excellent work and disregard of personal danger, though constantly bombed, machine gunned and sometimes shelled in front of Arras and in the advance on Valenciennes and Mons". He later led his section on the great march across the Rhine as part of the Army of Occupation in Germany.

== Kimberley ==
Morris returned to South Africa after the war and went to Kimberley to join De Beers as a construction electrician, resigning in 1926 to take up the post of "City Electrician" with the Kimberley City Council – or as "City Electrical Engineer" as the position came to be designated from 1930 onwards.

=== Developing Kimberley's electrical reticulation ===
His first task was to re-organise the obsolete electrical reticulation of the city, although dual control by Kimberley and De Beers continued. He encouraged the use of electrical appliances to increase the load, revenue and size of the municipal network. Morris later recalled that although Kimberley was famed for its early street lighting, he'd been astonished on his first day with the municipality to have a staff member report for paraffin and fodder for his horse, his job being to light up the rather primitive lamps in the "far West End" of the city. For prioritising the extension of electric street lighting in the poorer parts of town, Sol Plaatje was to inscribe a copy of his novel Mhudi (1930) to "Mr H.A. Morris, with the author's compliments and happy memories of the lights of the first Electric City on the Continent of Africa."

In 1941, dual control of Kimberley's electrical reticulation was finally ended, and, as Morris put it, the city regained its birthright. The department expanded rapidly.

=== Kimberley Airport and aviation ===
In 1930-31, when Imperial Airways planned its Trans-Africa Air Service, Kimberley upgraded its aerodrome. This new venture was included in the engineer's portfolio, which became "City Electrical and Airport Department". The Kimberley airfield's night lighting was proclaimed the best on the continent and was subsequently copied by Johannesburg.

In 1934, the Kimberley Air Rally, largely organized by H.A. Morris, attracted 20,000 spectators, hugely popularising aviation. He was a co-founder of the Municipal Airports Association, and launched the Kimberley Aviation Society (1936). In 1938, with impending war, he submitted a scheme to set up a pilot training school "on the safest aerodrome in the world where the highest possible number of flying hours could be had". The Union Defence Force and Royal Air Force leased the whole municipal airport in Dec 1939 for this purpose. During the war, as a 'key man', he was prevented from volunteering for service and so remained in Kimberley.

== The Northern Cape ==
In 1943, Morris conceived the idea of a Northern Cape region, with Kimberley as 'capital', and in that year he was responsible for publishing a map in which the name "Northern Cape" was used for the first time to define the area. Thinking along these lines dated back at least to 1936 when he and George Robertson approached Eskom with proposals for power lines along the Vaal and Modder Rivers to feed the Kimberley region. In 1946, with Russell Elliott and Graham Eden, he co-founded the Northern Cape and Adjoining Areas Development Association, publishing further pamphlets and maps to promote this hitherto neglected region which held enormous potential, particularly in terms of its mineral wealth. (Jottings among Morris's personal papers indicate a search for a name for the region that would not require translation – "Nova Kaap" being one possibility – but "Northern Cape" was the name that stuck).

In 1944, H.A. Morris, upon retirement, was re-employed as Municipal Development Officer. One of his campaigns at this time was for the generation of electricity for the Northern Cape using Vierfontein low-grade coal. The idea was taken up in due course. From 1946 he was a member of the fund-raising committee for the building of the Northern Cape Technical College, the William Humphreys Art Gallery and the theatre complex.

== Freeman of the City ==
In 1967, H.A. Morris was made a Freeman of the City of Kimberley and was also the recipient of a Rotary Honours Award. The citation, referring to Morris's "yeoman service in pioneering the establishment of the Northern Cape and Adjoining Areas Regional Development Association" which had "proved to be of inestimable benefit to the City of Kimberley and the Region as a whole", as well as his having been "a leading figure in promoting the interests of the City of Kimberley in the early years of commercial aviation in South Africa," was handed to Mr Morris by the Mayor, Councillor G.B. Haberfeld, during a municipal ceremony.

Following his death in 1977 the Intake Substation at Homestead, Kimberley, was opened and named the Harold Morris Substation.

== Family ==
H.A. Morris married Mavis Aitkin Hull McIntyre (granddaughter of Kimberley pioneers David McIntyre and George Henry Hull) at St Cyprian's Cathedral in Kimberley in April 1920 and the couple had a daughter, Elizabeth, and a son, Roger. In 1947, H.A. Morris and his son Roger Morris, with Graham Eden, founded an electrical firm named Morris & Eden Pty Ltd, later Morris Radio Engineers (Pty) Ltd. Morris's sister-in-law, Olive Grant Vigne McIntyre, was City Librarian of Kimberley.
