= Richard Brooke (priest) =

British-South African Archdeacon of Cape Town, Cape Colony

Archdeacon of The Cape
- In office 1905-1926

Personal details
- Born: 1840
- Died: 4 April 1926 (aged 85–86) Rondebosch, South Africa
- Children: John Brooke
- Education: University of the Cape

The Ven. Richard Brooke J.P. (1840–1926) was Archdeacon of The Cape from 1905 to 1926.

Brooke was educated at the University of the Cape and ordained Deacon in 1864 and Priest in 1865. He was a Tutor at the Diocesan College until 1866 when he became Rector of Philippolis. After further incumbencies at Clanwilliam and Claremont he became Principal of the Diocesan College. In 1901 he became Rector of Kalk Bay.

He died on 4 April 1926 at Rondebosch. His son was Dean of Cape Town from 1932 to 1947.
