= Rondebosch Park =

Park in Rondebosch, Cape Town, in South Africa

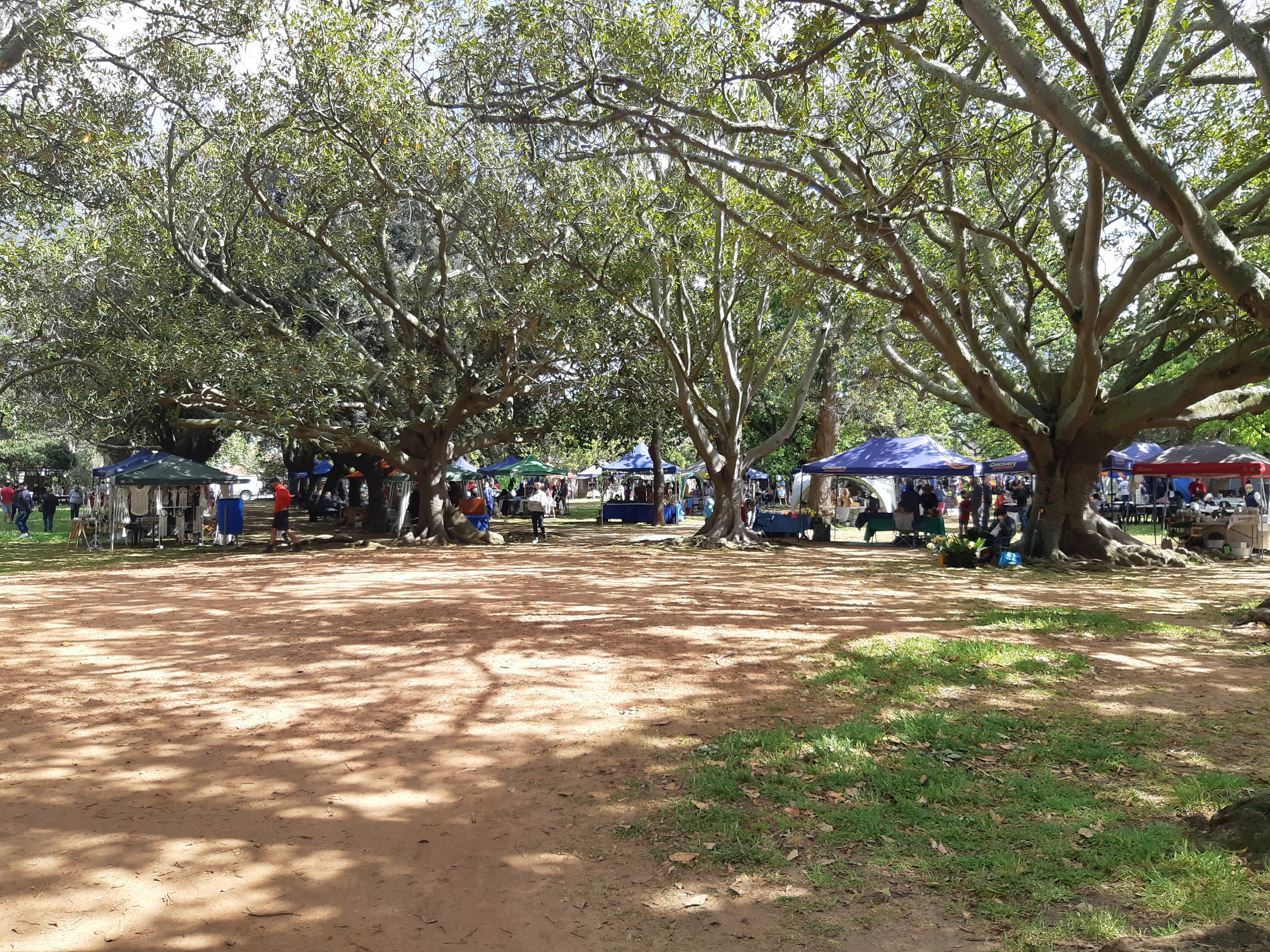
- The Potter's Market at Rondebosch Park.
- Interactive map of Rondebosch Park
- Type: Urban park
- Location: Rondebosch, Cape Town, South Africa
- Coordinates: 33°57′51″S 18°28′38″E
- Area: 2 hectares (4.9 acres)
- Open: 1870
- Status: Open all year
- Website: Rondebosch Park

Rondebosch Park is a park in Rondebosch, Cape Town, South Africa. It is located on the corner of Campground Road and Sandown Road. The park is laid out with avenues of trees, and is used for regular markets and a Potter's Market held twice a year, usually on March and November. The park was originally owned by the Rondebosch and Mowbray municipalities and is subsidized by the local government. A potter's market is held on the second-last Saturday of March and November, it is one of the largest pottery markets in the Western Cape.

== History ==
The park was opened in 1870, when it was still a part of the Rondebosch Common. The park was split up later that year by the local municipality.
