= Laurence Parsons (priest) =

British priest

Laurence Edmund Parsons was an eminent Anglican clergyman in the 20th century.
He was born on 22 July 1883 and educated at Winchester, Christ Church and Cuddesdon. Ordained in 1908, he initially held curacies at St Bartholomew's, Leeds. then Chaplain to the Bishop of Southwark before becoming a missionary in Shandong. Later he was Vicar of Chippenham then Dean of Cape Town. After this he was Director of the South African Church Institute then General Secretary of the SPCK until his retirement in 1954. He died on 17 December 1972

== Notes ==
Anglican Church of Southern Africa titles
Preceded by Cecil Henry Rolt	Dean of Cape Town; 1925– 1928	Succeeded by Sidney Warren Lavis
