= Marthinus Versfeld =

South African philosopher (1909–1995)

Marthinus Versfeld (or Martin Versfeld; 11 August 1909 – 18 April 1995) was a South African philosopher. From 1937 to 1972 he taught at the University of Cape Town. He was celebrated as researcher, enjoyed the recognition of the South African literary community and was known as an opponent of the Apartheid system. His work ranged from scholarly books to playful essays on issues like ethics, anthropology, the meaning of life.

== Life ==
Versfeld came from an Afrikaans family with a long history in the Western Cape region of South Africa. He attended the South African College Schools and did his undergraduate and Master's studies at the University of Cape Town. He moved on to Glasgow where he completed his doctoral dissertation on Descartes' metaphysics under the supervision of Archibald Bowman. In 1937 he was appointed as lecturer at UCT where he was to spend his entire career.

During his student years he became disaffected from the Protestant faith in which he was raised. However, in the late 1930s, he went through a time of serious religious uncertainty. Eventually, he converted to Catholicism in the early 1940s.

== Work ==
After the publication of his thesis as An essay on the metaphysics of Descartes (1940), Versfeld's first book was the polemical Oor gode en afgode [On gods and idols] (1948). This book contains a damning critique of war, exploitation and racism. He argued that "Christian nationalism" – a key concept from the Apartheid ideology – was a contradiction in terms.

Arguably Versfeld's most systematic books are The perennial order (1954) and The mirror of philosophers (1962). One finds in these books his engagement with Medieval philosophy – particularly Augustine and Thomas Aquinas – as well as with modern and contemporary philosophers. His work is characterised by the quest for an ethic of humaneness and care for the environment. This ethic is developed from intensive studies in philosophical anthropology. In the horizon of his work remains his opposition to the unjust political dispensation in South Africa.

The bulk of his philosophy was published in collections of scholarly essays. He did, however, also publish translations, commentaries and essays for the broader public.

The nexus of anthropology and ethics is arguably the most important theme running through his work of the 1960s and 1970s. The playfulness and humour, as well as his ethic of simplicity – themes for which he became best known – appear in these works, as they did since Klip en klei (1968). One also notices the gradual increase in his attention to classical Eastern wisdom: he offered a translation of Lao-Tzu's Tao te ching (Die lewensweg van Lao-Tse, 1988) and a series of essays, especially in Our selves and in Pots and poetry (1985). Eating became a central motive in his ethics, as is witnessed by Food for thought (1983).

== Major themes ==
=== Religion ===
All Versfeld's work bear the trace of his religious convictions. However, it is not possible to give a single characterisation of the way this conviction affected his work. In the 1948 book, Oor gode en afgode one finds him lauding the early Christian Church's anti-imperialism (the Second World War serves as background for this) or, again, advocating a version of "Christian science". At the same time, this fervour is strongly opposed to the petit-bourgeois morality of South African cultural conservatism and it is explicitly against the ideological combination of "Christian Nationalism".

In his later work, Versfeld expresses his critique of religious apologetics – against "some superficial fools who write books on apologetics". At the end of his life, he reiterated this view: “there are works of Catholic apologetics of the very recent past which claim to provide all the answers, falling very far short of the wisdom of the sage in Chuang-zu (22.1) who said: ‘We come nowhere being near right, since we have the answers.” Furthermore, he acknowledged the ambiguity of his own faith: "To be a Christian cannot possibly mean to conform to a type or to coincide with the paradigm case. And if you are asked by anybody with such an idea in the back of his mind, whether you are a Christian, it is intensely embarrassing. You may say no, not because you are Judas, but because you are trying not to be." Still later, he would conclude: "True religion finds itself comic.". This almost negative-theological trait of his later religious thought is accompanied by a secularising turn – his later philosophy is shot through with the conviction that "The secular is the miraculous."

=== Anthropology and philosophy ===
Much earlier this not-knowing was already at the centre of his philosophical anthropology. In the autobiographical essay, "Descartes and me" (1960), Versfeld described his intellectual development as the move away from the certainty of the Cartesian cogito to the Augustine's "factus eram ipse mihi magna questio, I became a great puzzle to myself."

On the one hand, this affected Versfeld’s self-understanding as a philosopher. In 1960 he could describe his work as "post-modern". The playfulness that increasingly characterise his work in the later decades, could be construed as the appropriation of the fundamental uncertainty at the centre of his thought. Hence he could open his 1971 inaugural lecture as follows: “I must confess at once that I do not know what philosophy is. This sometimes embarrasses me before the innocence of students, but not before those who have come to realise that the things by which we live are the things about which we know least. We do not know what life is, or what knowing is, or what truth and goodness are.” In later years he would drive this irony to its utmost: “I have fought a long duel with seriousness. That is why there is no need to take me seriously.”

On the other hand, Versfeld took over from both Descartes and Augustine the central significance of understanding the human being for his philosophy. This is reflected in the titles of books such as Our selves or Persons. In fact, he claimed that "Philosophy ought to start with anthropology in the Continental use of the term. What comes first is not theory of knowledge, but the problem of the being of man [sic]."

Essentially, this problem of being human has to do with the conflict between two selves: the real, historically situated, but nevertheless abysmally mysterious self and the pathological masquerades thereof, the grasping, dominating, manipulating self. Never is there question of a moralising choice for the first at the expense of the second. Rather, Versfeld is attentive to the inevitable cohabitation of the two.

=== Social and political thought ===
Nevertheless, this does not take away from the importance he attaches to the first. And the distortions of the self – distortions to which Descartes and other modern philosophers gave philosophical expression – are reflected in the socio-political pathologies of modernity: its "dominative epistemology", its destruction of nature, its wars and exploitation of people.

This socio-political critique remains far from abstract. Although there is no sustained examination of the apartheid state in Versfeld’s work, his judgement on the injustice and harm of this system is clearly expressed: “The whites accelerated their self-exploitation by means of the exploitation of other races. Through their ingenuity in the sphere of transport and explosives they were in the position to utilise the non-whites as means for their own ends.” and in the religious parlance that was his in the 1948 book, he categorically rejects “racial discrimination, one-sided patriotism, participation in unjust war, exploitation, etc.” In South Africa, he writes in 1971 “we are bedevilled by a racialist capitalism exacerbated by our industrial and technological revolution, which justifies itself by a scriptural literalism.” His dissatisfaction with the contemporary solutions to the country’s political situation is captured succinctly as follows: “On the one hand we have the inadequate response of a nominalism of race, and on the other the conceptualism of abstract liberalism. One produces a variety without love, and the other a unity without significant differences. The creation of a nation requires the analogical mind which will accept the situation as matter seeking form, respect the variety, and seek the solution of charity.” But he could also argue his case in terms of human rights, by concluding in 1960 that: “If these rights belong to every man whatever his race and colour and by virtue solely of his being made for the truth, their preservation is the due of every man to every man. This prescribes that the means employed may not include trickery, outrage, lies or robbery. Justice is colour-blind, and requires for its realisation that we should see, beyond the contingencies of biology and history the image of truth in every man, which often in spite of himself is striving for expression in a common world. These contingencies are relevant as the material in which justice must be realised. But one could make no greater mistake than to mistake the matter for the form, that is, to give justice a racial expression instead of giving race a just expression. This applies impartially to black, white, and yellow since as justice is man's universal due, the doom of injustice done also works impartially upon all. What we have to do with is a law of human nature which extends to its metaphysical roots. It is a prescription to human wills before it is a prescription by them, and as such is as unalterable as the law of gravity."

== Influence and recognition ==
Versfeld exerted a broad influence on students, philosophers, activists and authors of literature. Among his students count Athol Fugard, Adam Small, Jeremy Cronin, Breyten Breytenbach, Richard Turner, Augustine Shutte and Jane Carruthers.

Versfeld was invited by the University of Notre Dame to participate in the 1966–67 "Perspectives in Philosophy" lecture series (with Stephan Körner, A. J. Ayer, Stephen Pepper and O. K. Bouwsma).

In 1977 Versfeld received the Stals Prize of the Suid-Afrikaanse Akademie vir Wetenskap en Kuns. He also received honorary doctorates from the University of Cape Town and the University of Johannesburg.

== Media and archive ==
Katinka Heyns, with Chris Barnard and colleagues, produced a documentary on Versfeld for the SABC, entitled "Marthinus Versfeld : man van klip en klei" (1989).

The academic material of Versfeld's archive is kept by the Library of the University of Cape Town.

== Bibliography ==
=== Books ===
- Versfeld, Marthinus. An Essay on the Metaphysics of Descartes. London: Methuen & Co, 1940.
- Versfeld, Marthinus & De Klerk, W.A. Berge van die Boland [The mountains of the Western Cape]. Stellenbosch: Kosmo, 1965 [1947].
- Versfeld, Marthinus. Oor Gode en Afgode [On gods and idols]. Cape Town: Nasionale Pers, 1948.
  - Second edition: Oor Gode en Afgode [On gods and idols] (with an introduction by Ernst Wolff). Pretoria: Protea, 2010.
- Versfeld, Marthinus. The Perennial Order. Dublin: Brown & Nolan, 1954.
- Versfeld, Marthinus. The Mirror of Philosophers. London: Sheed and Ward, 1960.
- Versfeld, Marthinus. Rondom die Middeleeue [On the Middle Ages]. Cape Town: Nasionale Boekhandel, 1962.
- Versfeld, Marthinus. "Talking Metaphysics" in: Versfeld, M & Meyer, R. On Metaphysics. Pretoria: Unisa, 1966.
- Versfeld, Marthinus. Wat is kontemporêr? Vier opstelle oor ons tyd. Johannesburg: Afrikaanse Pers-Boekhandel, 1966.
- Versfeld, Marthinus. Klip en Klei [Stone and clay]. Pretoria: Human en Rousseau, 1968.
  - Second edition: Klip en Klei [Stone and clay]. Pretoria: Protea, 2008
- Versfeld, Marthinus, De Klerk, W.A. & Degenaar J.J. Beweging Uitwaarts [Movement outwards]. Cape Town: John Malherbe, 1969.
- Versfeld, Marthinus. Plato. Die simposium of die drinkparty. Kaapstad: Buren-Uitgewers, 1970.
- Versfeld, Marthinus. The Socratic Spirit. University of Cape Town. Inaugural Lecture Series, no. 7, 1971.
- Versfeld, Marthinus. Persons. Cape Town: Buren, 1972.
- Versfeld, Marthinus. ’n Handleiding tot die Republiek van Plato. Kaapstad: Buren, 1974.
- Versfeld, Marthinus. Our selves. Cape Town: David Philip, 1979.
  - Second edition: Our selves (with an introduction by Ernst Wolff). Pretoria: Protea, 2010.
- Versfeld, Marthinus. Tyd en dae [Time and days]. Cape Town: Tafelberg, 1982.
- Versfeld, Marthinus. Food for Thought. A Philosopher's Cookbook. Cape Town: Carrefour, 1983.
- Versfeld, Marthinus. Die Neukery met die Appelboom [The trouble with the appletree]. Kaapstad: Tafelberg, 1985.
  - Second edition: Die Neukery met die Appelboom en ander essays [The trouble with the appletree] (with an introduction by André Brink). Pretoria: Protea, 2009.
- Versfeld, Marthinus. Pots and Poetry. Cape Town: Tafelberg, 1985.
  - Second etidition: Pots and Poetry and other essays (with an introduction by André Brink). Pretoria: Protea, 2009.
- Versfeld, Marthinus. St. Augustine's Confessions and City of God. Cape Town: Carrefour, 1990.
- Versfeld, Marthinus. SUM. Selected Works / 'n Keur uit sy werke. Cape Town: Carrefour, 1991.

== Secondary bibliography ==
- Allen, Jonathan. "A Competing Discourse on Empire", in Grant Parker (ed.), South Africa, Greece and Rome: Classical Confrontations. Cambridge: Cambridge University Press (forthcoming).
- Carruthers, Jane. "Men in my (historical) life", Historia 52/2 2007, 269–272.
- Brink, André. "In praise of all that is fleeting and eternal", introduction to Marthinus Versfeld, Pots and poetry and other essays (2d edition) Pretoria: Protea, 2009, 7–16.
- Brink, André. "Marthinus Versfeld – 'n volledige lewe", introduction to Marthinus Versfeld Die Neukery mat die Appelboom en ander essays [The trouble with the appletree]. Pretoria: Protea, 2009, 9–17.
- De Klerk, W.A. "Marthinus Versfeld: die man en sy denke", Tydskrif vir Letterkunde 4, 1966, 62–72.
- De Klerk, W.A. "Marthinus Versfeld: mens en denker", Tydskrif vir Geesteswetenskappe 23/3, 1983, 178–186.
- Nash, Andrew. "Marxism and dialectic, from Sharpeville to the negotiated settlement", in The dialectical tradition in South Africa. London/New York: Routledge, 2009, 159–184, here 159–164.
- Rossouw, Hennie. "Die kuns van die lewe is om tuis te kom. Gedagtes oor die filosofie van Martin Versfeld", Tydskrif vir Geesteswetenskappe 36/1, 1996, 11–20.
- Sienaert, Marilet. "(Inter)teks as tranformasie: 'n nuwe Breytenbach-gedig opgedra aan Martin Versfeld", Stilet 8/1, 1996, 70–81.
- Sweet, William. "Martin Versfeld, Citizenship, and the 'Civitas Dei'," Philosophy, Culture, and Traditions, 13, 2017, 11-25.
- Van Niekerk, Marlene. "Die etende Afrikaner. Aantekeninge vir 'n klein tipologie", in Van Volksmoeder tot Fokoppolisiekar. Kritiese opstelle oor Afrikaanse herinneringsplekke. Stellenbosch: SUN Press, 75–92.
- Viljoen, Neil. "Shakespear's The Tempest and Martin Versfeld's 'Comments on the rapist society'", The English Academy Review 5/5, 1988.
- Wolff, Ernst. "Sanctus Marthinus laudator philosophicus", Fragmente 4, 1999, 87–101.
- Wolff, Ernst. "Die neukery met verval en herstel in Versfeld se storie van die appelboom", Koers 74/3, 2009, 539–542.
- Wolff, Ernst. "Selfkennis en verstandigheid in 'n tyd van politieke raserny", in Marthinus Versfeld, Oor gode en afgode (2d edition) Pretoria: Protea, 2010, 7–40.
- Wolff, Ernst. "Grasping the truth from where we are", in Marthinus Versfeld, Our selves (2d edition) Pretoria: Protea, 2010, 6–39.
- Wolff, Ernst. "Poiesis. Oor maaksels en hul wêreld na aanleiding van Versfeld se Pots and poetry", Tydskrif vir letterkunde 48/1, 2011, 206–215.
- Wolff, Ernst, Martin Versfeld. A South African Philosopher in Dark Times, Leuven: Leuven University Press, 2021, (with contributions by Ruth Versfeld, Paul van Tongeren, Kobus Krüger, Marlene van Niekerk & Antjie Krog)
