= Roy Cowdry =

British clergyman in South Africa

- Died: 6 November 1984
- Education: King's College London

The Rt Rev. Roy Walter Frederick Cowdry, AKC was Suffragan Bishop of the Anglican Diocese of Cape Town and Archdeacon of Cape Town from 1958 to 1964.

Cowdry was educated at King's College London and ordained in 1942. After curacies in Perivale and Ealing he became Domestic Chaplain to the Archbishop of Cape Town.

In 1964 he became Rector of St Cuthbert, Port Elizabeth; and in 1970 of St Phillip in the same city.

He died on the 6th of November 1984, and his ashes were interred in the St Cuthbert's Garden of Remembrance.
