= Rondebosch =

Suburb of Cape Town, South Africa

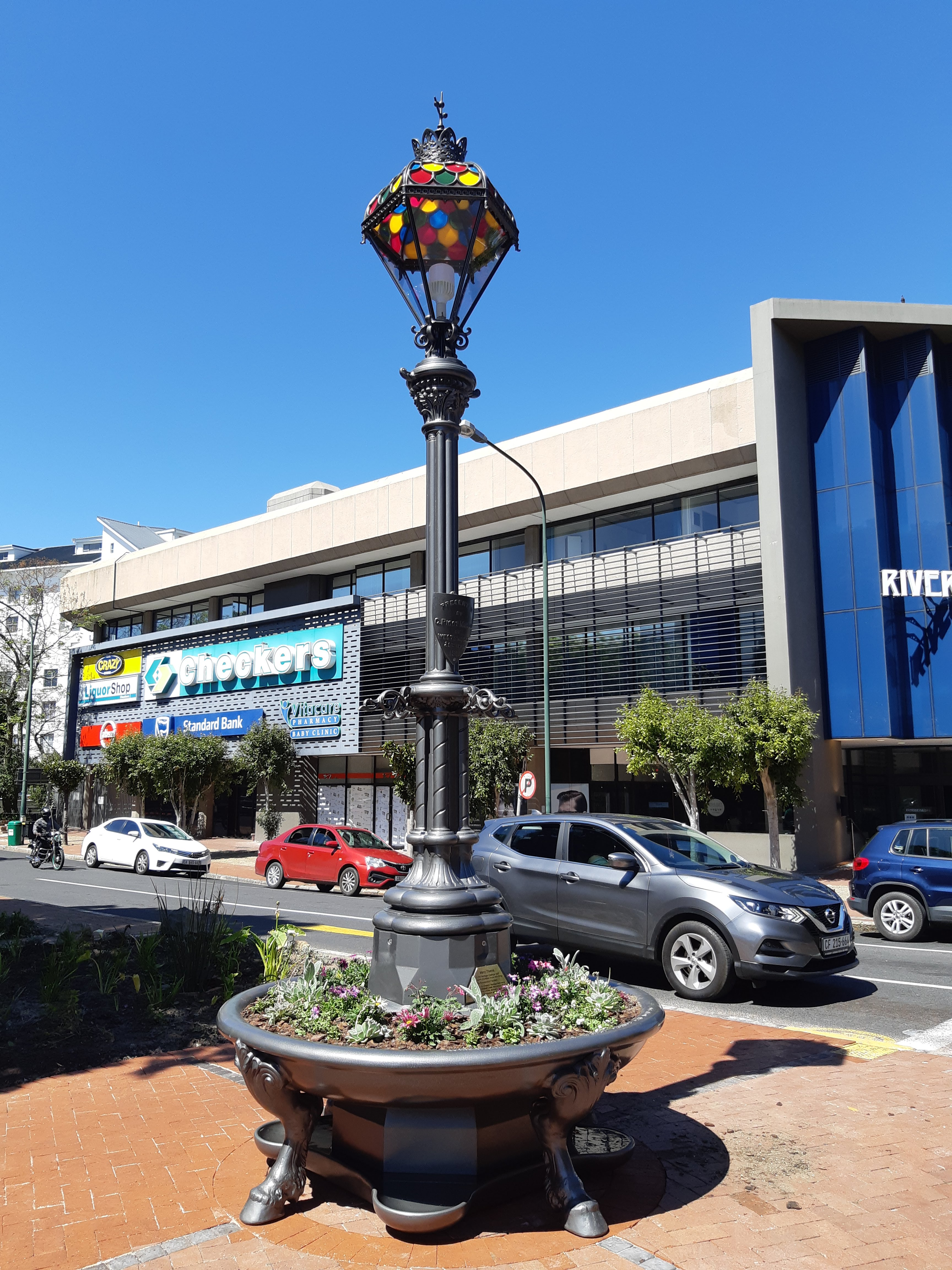
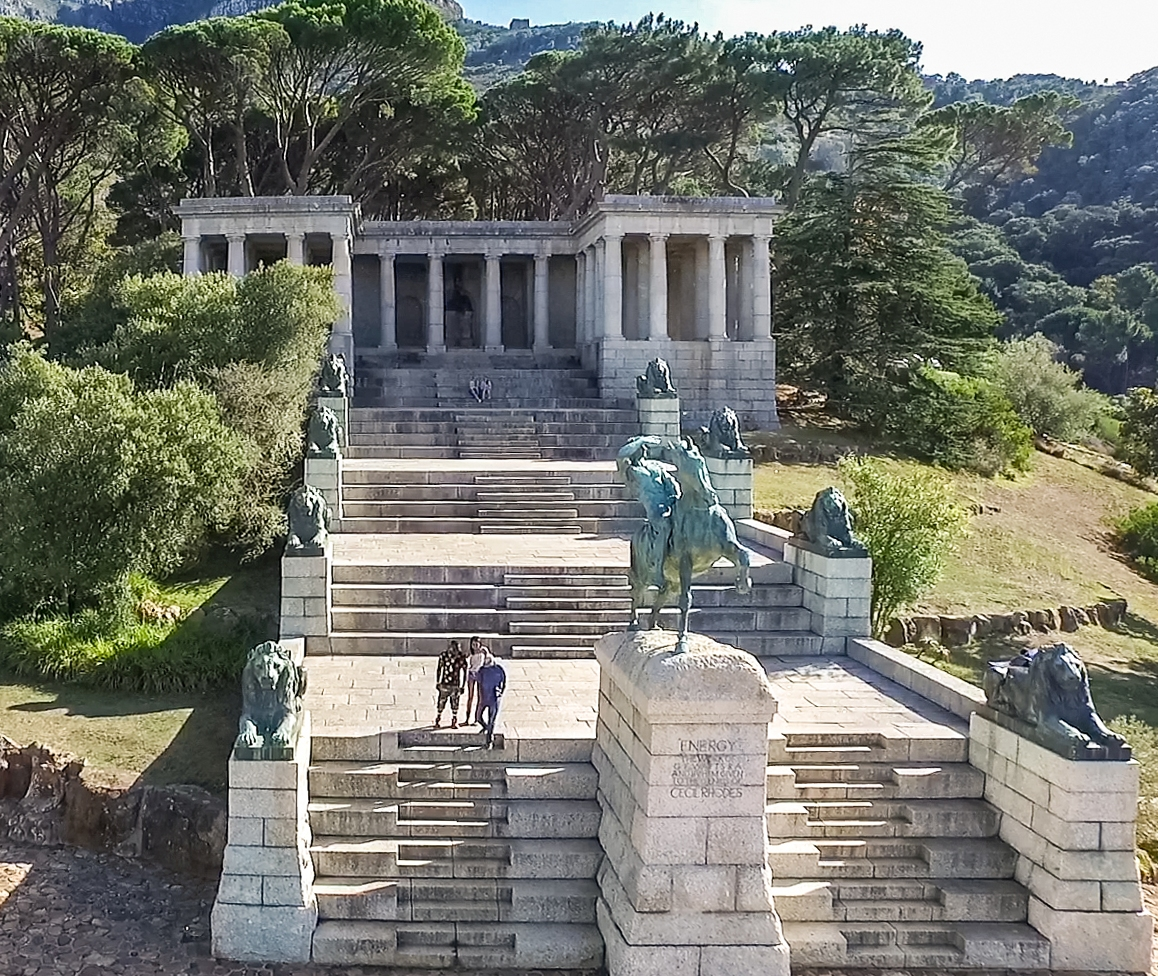
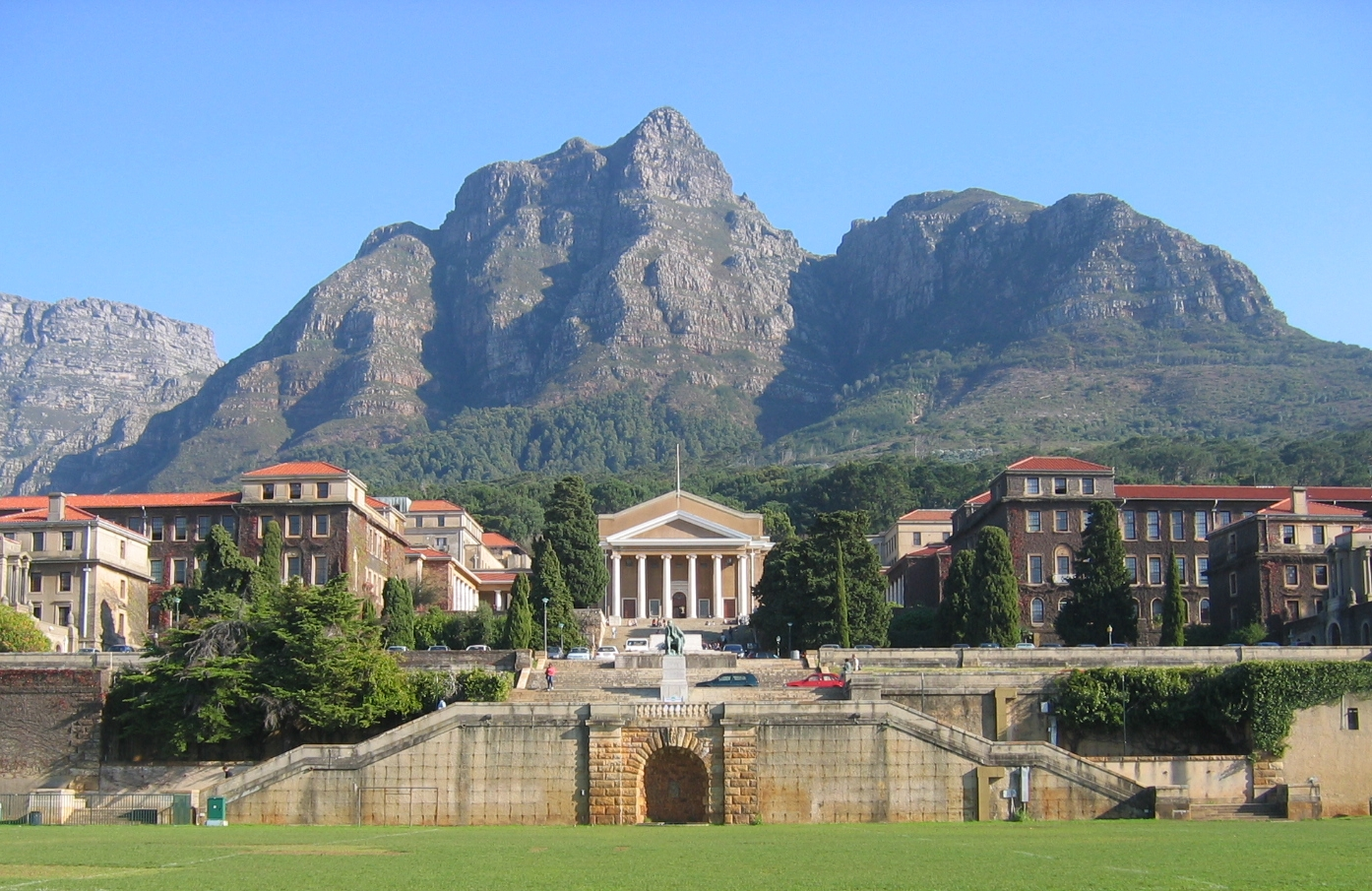
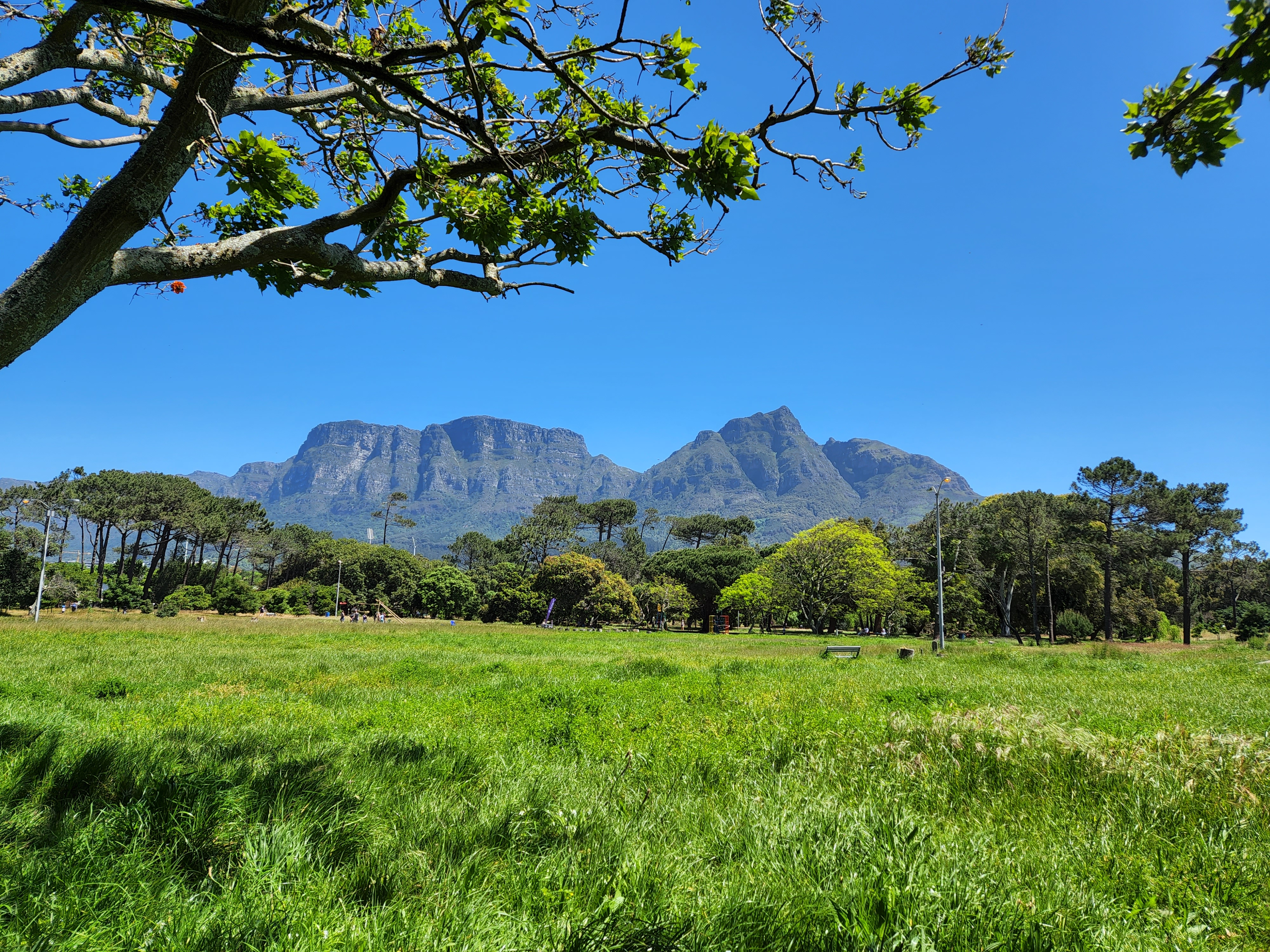
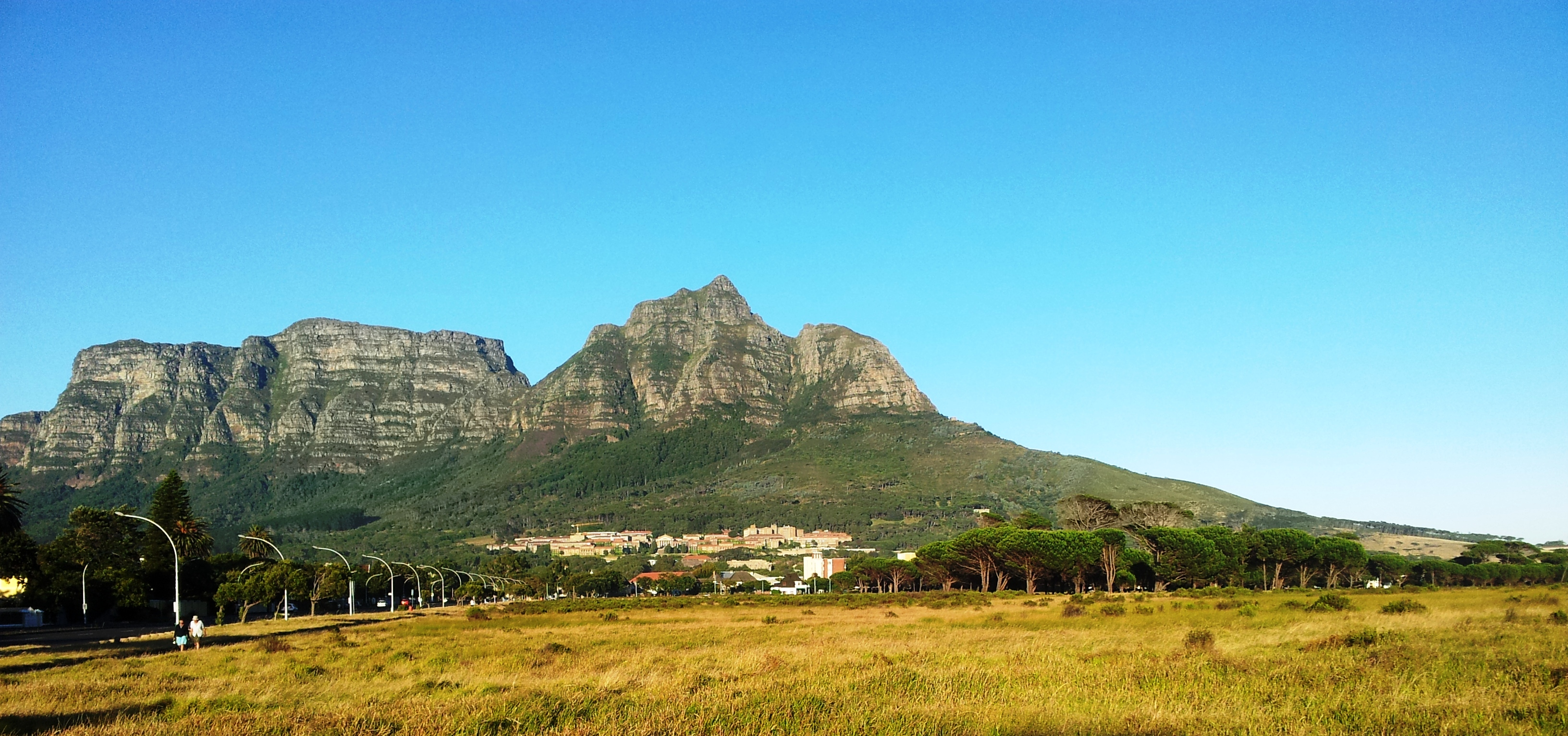
- Rondebosch Fountain Rhodes Memorial University of Cape Town Keurboom Park Rondebosch Common
- Interactive map of Rondebosch
- Coordinates: 33°57′48″S 18°28′35″E
- Country: South Africa
- Province: Western Cape
- Municipality: City of Cape Town
- Main Place: Cape Town

Area
  - Total: 6.42 km^{2} (2.48 sq mi)

Population (2011)
  - Total: 14,591
  - Density: 2,270/km^{2} (5,890/sq mi)

Racial makeup (2011)
  - Black African: 16.5%
  - Coloured: 9.6%
  - Indian/Asian: 6.1%
  - White: 62.7%
  - Other: 5.0%

First languages (2011)
  - English: 84.3%
  - Afrikaans: 7.6%
  - Xhosa: 1.8%
  - Other: 6.3%
- Time zone: UTC+2 (SAST)
- Postal code (street): 7700
- PO box: 7701
- Area code: (021) 685/686

Rondebosch is one of the Southern Suburbs of Cape Town, South Africa. It is primarily a residential suburb, with shopping and business districts as well as the main campus of the University of Cape Town.

== History ==
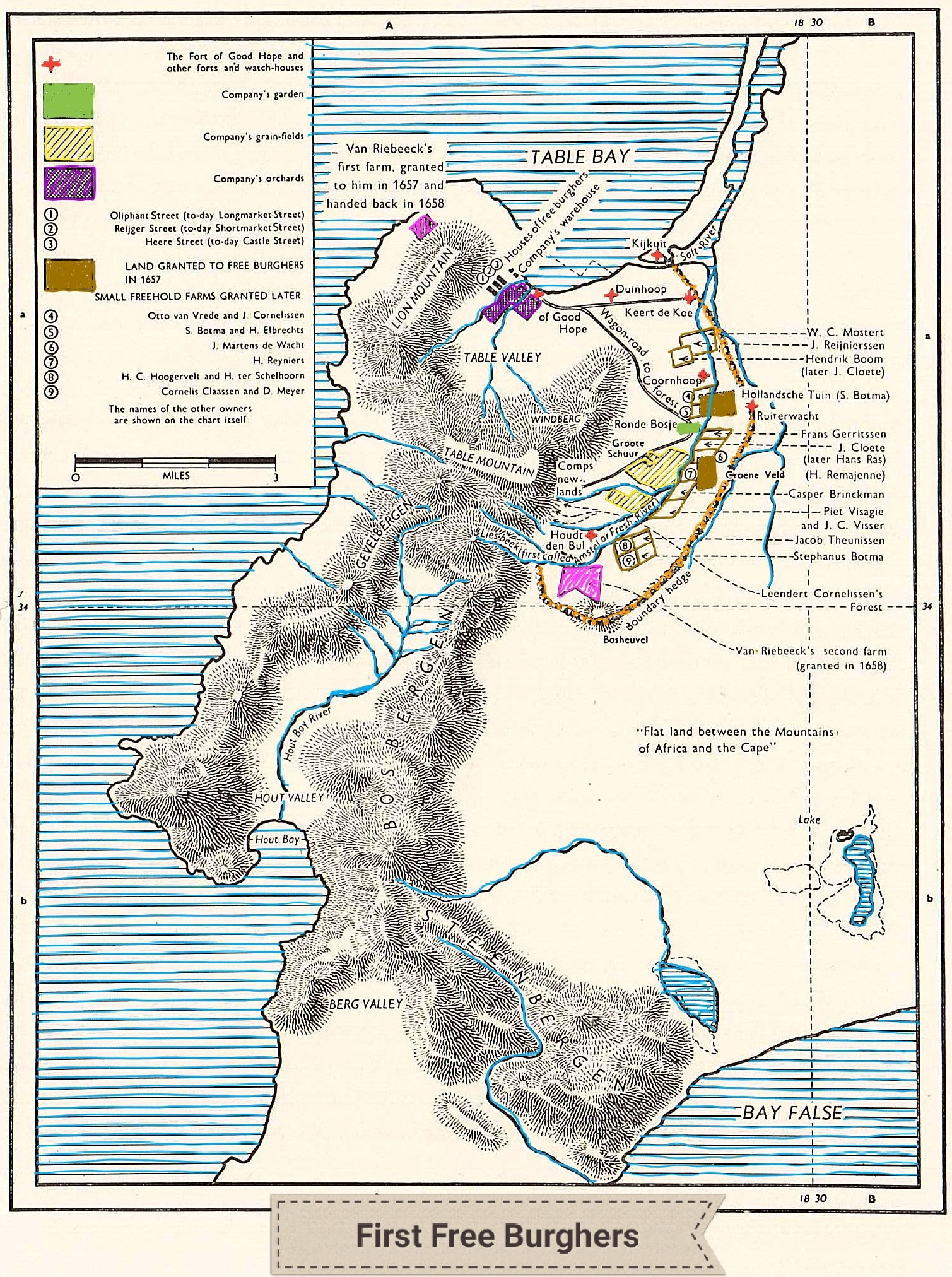
A map of the first farms granted to free burghers by the VOC in 1650s mentioning the farm of "Ronde Bosje" from which Rondebosch got its name.

Four years after the first Dutch settlement at the Cape in 1652, the first experimental crops were grown along the banks of the Liesbeek River (at that stage called the Amstel or Versse Rivier). In October 1656, Jan van Riebeeck visited Rondeboschyn, whose name derived from a contraction of "Ronde Doorn Bossien," referring to a circular grove of thorn trees growing on the banks of the Liesbeek River. By 1670 the area's name had been shortened to "Rondeboschje" in the Dutch East India Company's (VOC) records.

In 1657, the first group of VOC employees gained free burgher status, four of whom were granted land along the river and founded "Stephen's Colony" in the area now known as Rondebosch. The first permanent title of land in southern Africa was issued, by Van Riebeeck, to the four free burghers of Rondebosch.

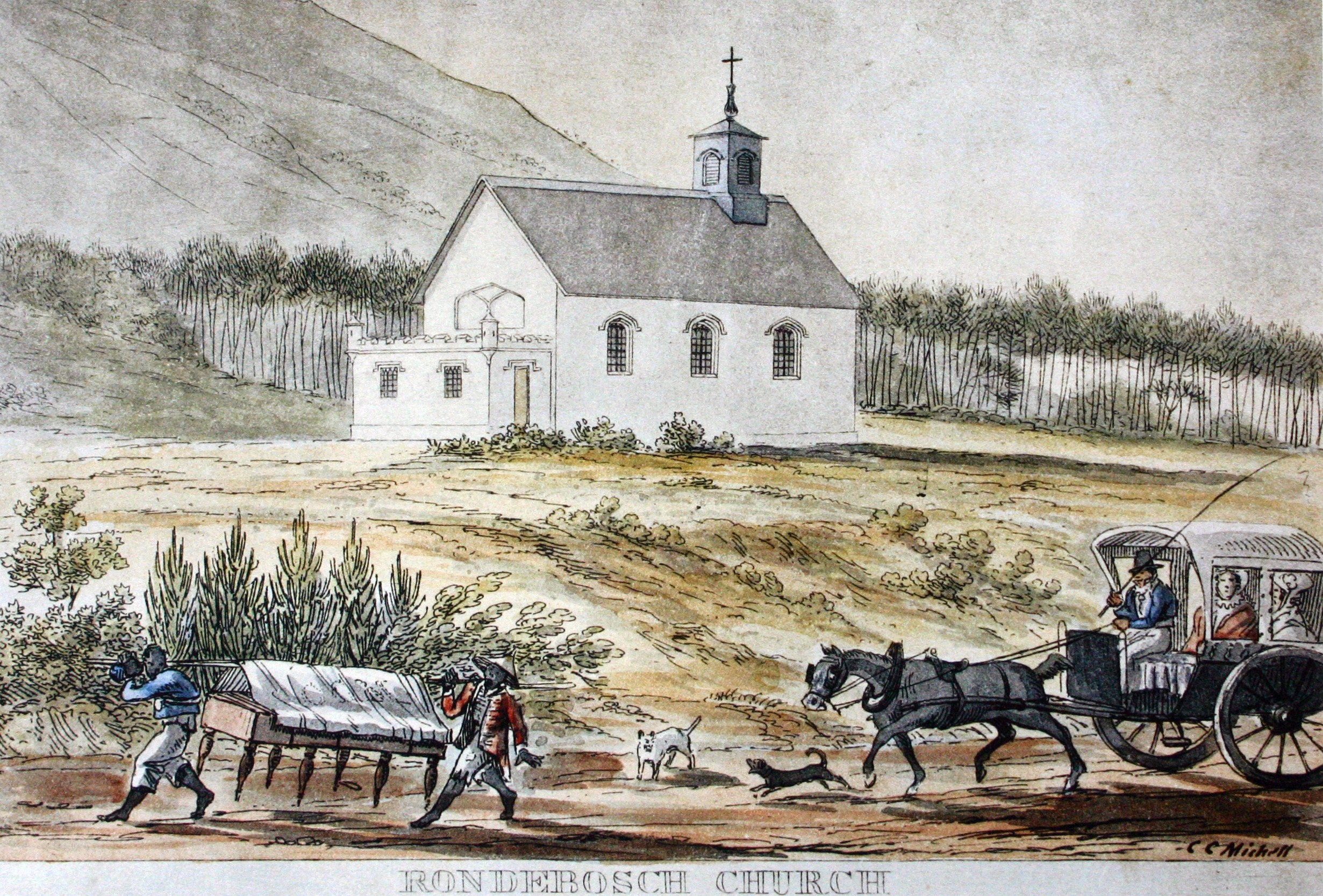
Rondebosch Church, 1830s.

The area only obtained recognition as a separate village or area of Cape Town after the 1830s. In 1864 the area was connected by railway upon the competition of the Cape Town to Wynberg line. By the time of the 1875 census Rondebosch had a recorded population of 1,902 residents. The 1891 census recorded a population of 3,378, and by the time of the 1904 Cape census the area had a total population of 6,035, of whom 4,312 were recorded as being literate.

One of Cape Town's first municipal electricity stations was built in 1892 to supply power to the Rondebosch area, replacing the old oil street lamps with electric ones.

On 4 May 1990 the 'Groote Schuur Minute’ was co-signed in Rondebosch by the then leader of the African National Congress, Nelson Mandela, and then State President of South Africa, FW de Klerk, as a commitment to a peaceful negotiation process to end Apartheid. Thereby starting the process to peacefully transition to South Africa's modern democracy.

== Geography ==
Rondebosch lies between the slopes of Devil's Peak in the west and the M5 freeway in the east; it is one of the Southern Suburbs of Cape Town, which lie along the eastern slope of the Table Mountain massif. The suburb's western border with the Table Mountain National Park is defined by the M3 freeway. To the north are the suburbs of Rosebank and Mowbray, while to the south are Newlands and Claremont. The eastern border of Rondebosch is the M5 freeway; beyond the freeway are Sybrand Park, Athlone and Rondebosch East.

The Southern Line railway divides Rondebosch in two; the only road within Rondebosch that crosses the railway is the Belmont Road bridge. Main Road (the M4) runs north-south through the area west of the railway, while Campground Road runs in the same direction east of the railway. The third north-south through route is Milner Road, further east close to the M5.

The area around the intersection of Main Road and Belmont Road is Rondebosch's main commercial area, with several small shopping malls and two supermarkets. Also located in this area is Rondebosch railway station, which is the main public transport facility in the suburb. A smaller commercial area lies just to the east on the corner of Belmont and Campground Roads; there is also a row of shops along Belvedere Road in the southeastern part of the suburb. The rest of the suburb is used for educational and residential purposes, with the residential areas being generally denser further to the west where the influence of the University of Cape Town is felt.

Two canalised streams run from the slopes of Table Mountain through Rondebosch; the Liesbeeck River runs northwards between Main Road and the railway, while the Black River runs in a northeasterly direction through the eastern part of the suburb. The terrain is generally flat east of the railway line, while to the west it slopes upwards towards Devil's Peak.

The flower Erica turgida, was endemic in area between Rondebosch, Kenilworth and Wynberg before becoming extinct in the wild.

=== Landmarks ===
On the slopes of Devil's Peak above Rondebosch is the main campus of the University of Cape Town.

The historic Groote Schuur estate in Rondebosch includes presidential and ministerial residences with Cape Dutch origins. The Groote Schuur building is the biggest, rebuilt by Cecil Rhodes according to a design by Herbert Baker after a fire in 1896. The presidential residence, Genadendal (formerly Westbrooke), also dates back to Cape Dutch times. "The Woolsack" is a historic house within the grounds of the University of Cape Town that is now used as student housing. Previously part of Cecil Rhodes's estate at Groote Schuur, it was frequently used by the famous British poet and author Ruyard Kipling when he used to visit Cape Town for his winter holidays between 1898 and 1908.

The home of Simon van der Stel (first governor of the Cape Colony) is now part of Rustenburg Junior School. This building dates back to the 17th century, although it has undergone many alterations over the years. Its summer house, dating from 1760, remains as a monument just below the university. Other historic buildings in the area include the Rondebosch Town Hall, now occupied by the Rondebosch Library, and St. Paul's Church, which was designed by Charles Collier Michell.

Rondebosch Common, once a military campground, is a national monument and an important fynbos conservation area.

The Baxter Theatre in Rondebosch is Cape Town's second biggest theatre complex, after the Artscape Theatre Centre in the city centre.

==== Rondebosch Fountain ====
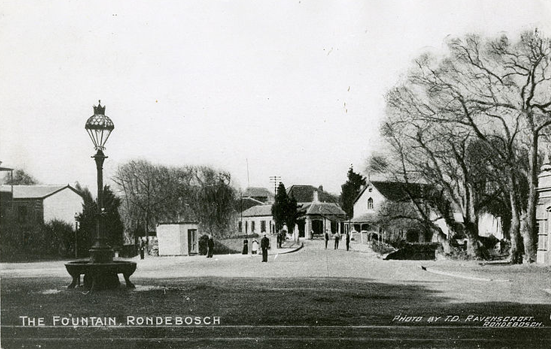
A street scene of Main Road Rondebosch in 1900. The recently installed Rondebosch Fountain can be seen to the left in the foreground.

The historic centre of Rondebosch is the Main Road, with the Victorian cast iron Rondebosch Fountain being a historic landmark. Originally known as the Moodie Fountain, it was one of South Africa's first electric streetlights. It was built by the Saracen Foundry in Glasgow and presented to the community by George Moodie as a gift in 1891. The lamp was first turned on, on 25 April 1892 and was initially powered by Moodie's private power plant until a municipal power plant on the Liesbeeck River was completed. The fountain was destroyed in a road accident in 2015 and rebuilt in 2020.

== Government and politics ==
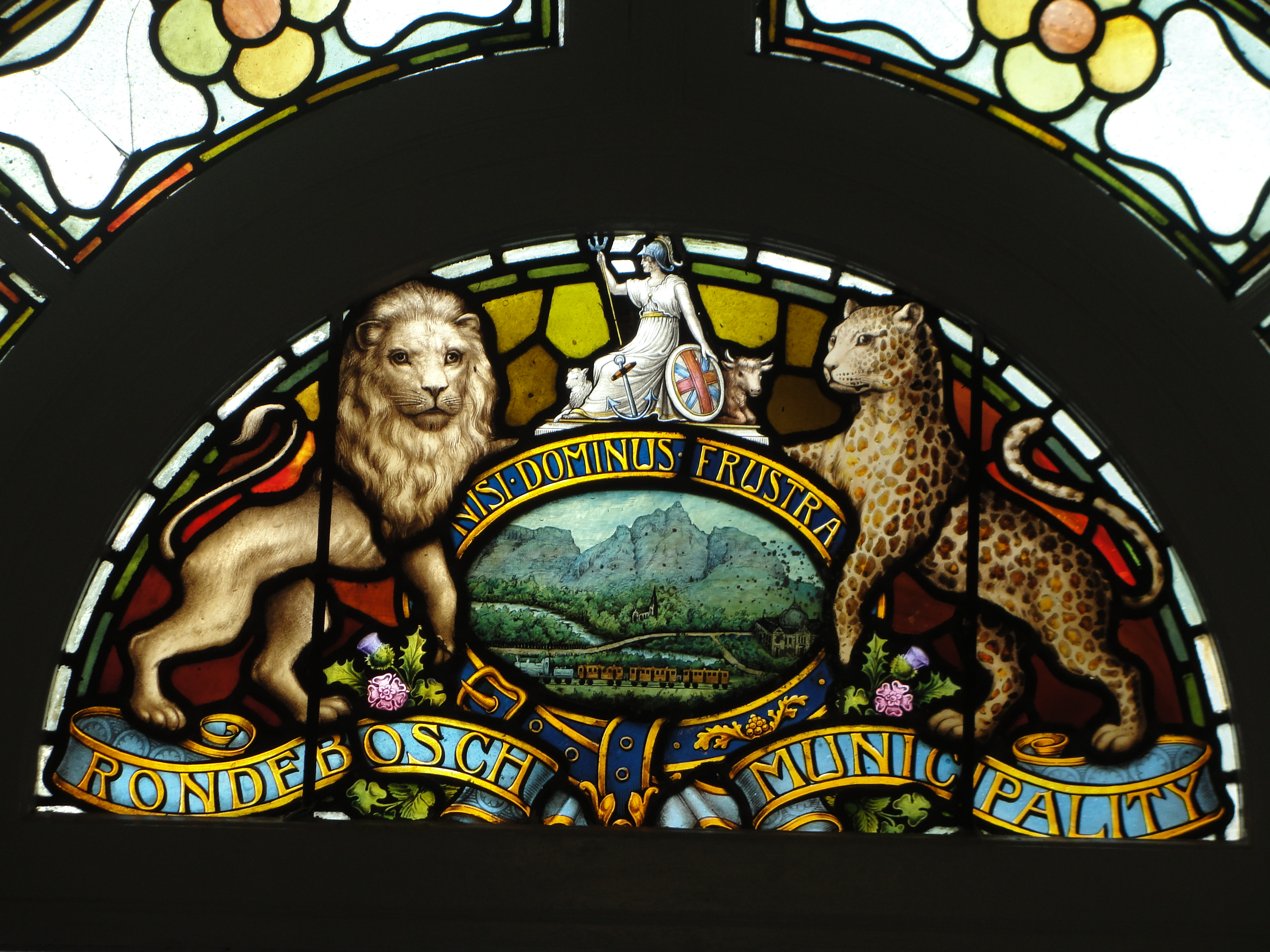
A stained glass window at the townhall depicting the old Rondebosch Municipality coat of arms.

Rondebosch is in the City of Cape Town municipality, within the Protea Sub-Council (Sub-Council 20). The eastern part of the suburb is within ward 58 and the ward councillor is Dr Richard Hill, and the western part is in ward 59 with councillor Mikhail Manuel, both members of the Democratic Alliance.

Rondebosch was the parliamentary seat of Sir De Villiers Graaff, the leader of the opposition United Party, and later that of Frederik van Zyl Slabbert, leader of the opposition Progressive Federal Party.

== Education ==
The western part of Rondebosch is dominated by the main campus of the University of Cape Town. Rondebosch is also notable for a high density of schools. Originally the Rondebosch Town Hall the Rondebosch Public Library is a notable landmark in the neighbourhood.

Schools in Rondebosch
Secondary or high schools	Groote Schuur High School • Rondebosch Boys' High School • Rustenburg Girls' High School • Westerford High School • South African College School (SACS)
Primary or elementary schools	Golden Grove Primary School • Groote Schuur Primary School • Rondebosch Boys' Preparatory School • Oakhurst Girls' Primary School • Rustenburg Girls' Junior School • Rosebank Junior School
Private schools	Diocesan College (Bishops) • Micklefield School • Forres Preparatory School • Progress College • St. Joseph's Marist College
Other schools	Pro-Ed House

== Sports and recreation ==
Western Province Cricket Club is the largest sports facility in Rondebosch, catering for many different sports, including tennis and hockey. The University itself has facilities for most sports. Other facilities include Rondebosch Golf Club and Rygersdal Football Club. Next door to Rondebosch is Newlands, home to the Newlands Stadium for rugby and soccer, and Newlands Cricket Ground.

Parks in Rondebosch include Keurboom Park and Rondebosch Park. Rondebosch Common is also a popular recreational park.

== Demographics ==
According to the 2011 census, 14,591 people live in Rondebosch. 62.7% described themselves as "White", 16.5% as "Black African", 9.6% as "Coloured" and 6.1% as "Indian or Asian". The predominant language is English, which is the first language of 84.3% of the population. 7.6% speak Afrikaans and 1.8% speak Xhosa.

In the second half of the 20th century (1950-1991), Rondebosch was a whites-only area in terms of the Group Areas Act, an Apartheid law that enforced segregation.

== Notable residents ==
- John Bardwell Ebden (1787 - 1873), Cape businessman and political leader.
- Louise Juta (1821-1893), book seller and sister of Karl Marx.
- Charles William Hutton (1826-1905), Cape politician.
- William Thorne (1839-1917), businessman and Cape politician.
- Richard Brooke (1840–1926), clergyman.
- Thomas Muir (1844-1934), mathematician.
- Harriet Mason (1845-1932), song collector, botanical illustrator, plant collector, advocate, and author.
- Walter Aubrey Kidd (1852–1929), physician and medical and zoological author.
- Johannes Hendricus Meiring Beck (1855-1919), physician and politician.
- Harry Scobell (1859-1912), soldier.
- Ernest Glanville (1855-1925), short story writer and author.
- William H. Andrews (1870-1950), union leader and politician.
- Arthur Howe-Browne (1881-1961), clergyman.
- May Edginton (1883-1957), novelist and play-write.
- Walter Michael Dickson (1884-1915), South African-Scottish rugby union footballer.
- Patric Curwen (1884 – 1949), actor.
- Harold Arthur Morris (1884–1977), soldier and electrical engineer.
- Mary Agard Pocock (1886-1977), South African phycologist.
- Tuppy Owen-Smith (1909-1990), English rugby union footballer and cricketer.
- Gabriel de Jongh (1913-2004), painter.
- Hector Macdonald (1915-2011), judge.
- Hazlitt Beatty (d.1916), railway engineer and manager at the Cape Government Railways.
- Brian Bunting (1920-2008), journalist, politician and anti-apartheid activist.
- Hannes Fagan (1927-2014), South African judge.
- Margaret Elsworth (1929-2023), philanthropist.
- David Millard (1931-1978), South African cricketer.
- Just Nuisance (1937-1944), only enlisted dog in the Royal Navy.
- Edward George Hudson Oliver (b.1938), botanist and author.
- J.M. Coetzee (b. 1940), Nobel laureate, author and scholar.
- Anthony Holiday (1940-2006), journalist, activist, academic and philosopher.
- Vintcent van der Bijl (b.1948), South African cricketer.
- Cameron Dugmore (b.1963), ANC politician.
