= Workers' Library and Museum =

Former library and museum in Johannesburg, South Africa

The Workers' Library and Museum was a non-profit labour service organisation (LSO) active in Johannesburg, South Africa between 1987 and the early 2000s. The organisation provided a meeting and learning centre for labour activists as well as students from the nearby Alexandra and Soweto areas. In 1994, it was expanded into the Workers and Museum in Newtown, Johannesburg, with the only museum in South Africa focussed on working people other than the Slave Lodge, Cape Town.

== History ==
The Workers' Library was founded in 1987 as an alternative to the racially segregated public library system under apartheid. Under apartheid, black workers and writers were "forbidden entrance into some of the basic institutions required to practice history, such as archives and public libraries." It was preceded by the Trade Union Library, founded in Cape Town in 1983: both were part of a larger wave of LSOs that emerged from the 1970s. Often initiated by politicised university students and graduates, these worked with the rising unions of the 1970s and 1980s. The "gathering strength of the labour movement" with its "exciting potential" for social change attracted academics who combined scholarship and "working-class perspectives."

In 1994, the Workers' Library was relocated to premises in the Newtown district, adjacent to Mary Fitzgerald Square, and near the Market Theatre, MuseuMAfricA and the national offices of the National Union of Metalworkers of South Africa (NUMSA). It was renamed the Workers' Library and Museum to reflect an expanded role: the new premises were a refurbished municipal compound (hostel) for black African migrant men workers, part of which was converted to a museum, part of which hosted the library collection, and part of which provided large venues for meetings; nearby cottages for skilled white workers were included, to be used for office space. The buildings housed employees of the now-defunct Jeppe Street Power Station and were a National Monument. The redesign was undertaken by the architect, anti-apartheid activist and radical Allan Robert Lipman in association with Henry Paine, for which they were awarded the South African Institute of Architects Award (SAIA) for Excellence. The Newtown area, including the power station and the Square had a long history as a site of worker protests and rallies, and was "intrinsically linked" to the working-class culture of the area that the Workers' Library and Museum now commemorated.

== Activities ==
The Workers' Library hosted numerous workshops and provided meeting space for unions. This continued in the 1990s and early 2000s, and the venue was also used by the new Anti-Privatisation Forum. Relations with unions were maintained through representatives attending the Johannesburg Local of the Congress of South African Trade Unions (COSATU) and running tables at union congresses, and the launch of a bookshop and t-shirt printing project directed at workers In the late 1990s, the Workers' Library and Museum formed a partnership with Khanya College, another Johannesburg-based LSO, which rented office space, refurbished part of the premises and provided some administrative support for venue bookings.

The Workers' Library and Museum was non-sectarian and inclusive in its approach. Its activities in the 1990s included Saturday afternoon workshops "typically attended by over 35 people, overwhelmingly drawn from the shop steward layer and community activists." The organisation was run by an elected committee of members, who were unpaid volunteers, including anarchists-syndicalists, COSATU members, people from the South African Communist Party (SACP), and Trotskyists . Likewise, the Workers Bookshop included a wide range of materials, from union (mainly but not only COSATU and its unions) and SACP materials, to Trotskyist newspapers and publications from the anarchist-syndicalist Bikisha Media / Zabalaza Books. It was the only left-wing bookshop in Gauteng province in the late 1990s and early 2000s.

Unlike LSOs such as the International Labour Research and Information Group (ILRIG) in Cape Town, the Workers’ Library and Museum was not actively involved in research and publishing, the main exception being an oral history project in the 1990s with former residents of the municipal compound. Its Board was a mixture of trade unionists, like Petros Mashishi, president of the South African Municipal Workers Union and academics linked to the unions and the larger national liberation movement, like Sakhela Buhlungu and Luli Callinicos.

== Closure ==
In the early 2000s, the Johannesburg Municipality withdrew its previous subsidies to the Workers' Library and Museum, which had taken the form of rebates on service charges, rent and taxes. Like other LSOs at the time, it was meanwhile hit by the drying up of donor and solidarity funding after the end of apartheid, and displacement by unions' own expanding research and service departments. Although it had links to the South African Municipal Workers Union (SAMWU), partly through Mashishi and through its highlighting of black municipal workers' history at the museum, there was no formal relationship or ongoing financial support.

Faced with growing debt and unable to pay municipal levies, the Workers' Library and Museum closed in the early 2000s. This was part of a larger decline in the LSO movement, and of left spaces and infrastructure countrywide post-apartheid.

The library collection is now housed at the offices of Khanya College, which relocated to Kerk Street, while the premises are now a separate Workers' Museum, run by the municipality for tourists and schools.
