= Mary Fitzgerald Square =

Public Square in Newtown, Johannesburg

- Interactive map of Mary Fitzgerald Square
- Location: Newtown, Johannesburg
- Coordinates: 26°12′09″S 28°01′53″E

The Mary Fitzgerald Square in Newtown, Johannesburg in South Africa, is a public space named after Mary "Pickhandle" Fitzgerald, who is considered to have been the first female trade unionist in the country.

A former wagon site previously known as Aaron's Ground, the square was named for Fitzgerald in 1939 as it was an often-used location for strikers' meetings in the early part of the 20th century.

The square features lighting designed by French lighting engineer Patrick Rimoux, and an installation of carved wooden heads.

The square is the centrepiece of the Newtown urban renewal project and is surrounded by structures significant to the city, including the Market Theatre, which played host to much of the 1980s 'struggle theatre' opposing the apartheid regime's discriminatory policies; MuseuMAfricA; the old Turbine Hall, and the Worker's Library.

== Events ==
On 2 July 2005, Mary Fitzgerald Square hosted the Johannesburg leg of the Live 8 series of concerts organised by Bob Geldof.

Since 2012, In The City has been hosted in the square on the first Friday of every October.
