= Alternatives =

- Founded: 1994
- Type: Non-profit; NGO
- Purpose: Latin America, Africa, Europe and the Middle East, as well as Central, South and Southeast Asia
- Location: Montreal, Quebec
- Region served: Worldwide
- Owner: Alternatives
- Revenue: Donors, International Organizations, Members and Governments
- Website: Official Website

Founded in 1994, Alternatives, Action and Communication Network for International Development, is a non-governmental, international solidarity organization based in Montreal, Quebec, Canada.

Alternatives works to promote justice and equality amongst individuals and communities worldwide. Active in over 35 countries, Alternatives supports local, community-based initiatives working towards the greater economic, social, and political rights of people and communities affected by poverty, discrimination, exploitation, and violence.

The organization publishes the Le Journal des Alternatives newsletter, a publication inserted every three months in Montreal's French paper Le Voir. Alternatives also publishes the Alternatives International Journal, a monthly publication in English distributed electronically.

Alternatives Montreal is the headquarters of an International Federation consisting of nine NGOs spread across the world. Alternative-Niger, Alternatives Asia (New Delhi), Alternative Information Center (Jerusalem), Forum Macrocain des Alternatives Sud, Initiative Pour un Autre Monde, Institut Alternatives Terrazul, Khanya College, and Teacher Creativity Center.

== Mission statement ==
Alternatives' mission statement (2009) reads: "Strengthened by our vision and national and international experience, Alternatives is an organization that works for solidarity, justice, and equity the world over. Alternatives' aim is to help the networking, building, and promoting of innovative initiatives in popular and social movements that are fighting for economic, social, political, cultural and environmental rights."

The organization says that it wants to "strengthen citizen action and reinforce the contribution of social movements in the construction of sustainable societies."

== International program ==
Alternatives is present in Latin America, Africa, Europe and the Middle East, as well as Central, South and Southeast Asia.

Alternatives Montreal is the headquarters of a federation consisting of nine NGOs spread across the world. Alternative-Niger, Alternatives Asia (New Delhi), Alternative Information Center (Jerusalem), Forum Macrocain des Alternatives Sud, Initiative Pour un Autre Monde, Institut Alternatives Terrazul, Khanya College, and Teacher Creativity Center.

In each of these regions, the organisation works in direct partnership with groups of women and men who are struggling for progress, respect and justice; as well as the peace and sustainable development of their community, their environment, and their region.

Alternatives supports network creation between groups so that they can benefit from their shared experiences and successes. Network formation is crucial since it allows for a deepened analysis and comprehension of the conflicts affecting their communities from the outside.

Alternatives' and its partners' international solidarity projects are centered upon:

- The environment and sustainable development
- Democracy
- Rehabilitation of communities affected by war
- Good governance
- Socio-economic justice and equality
- Civil, political, economic, social and human rights
- The fight against poverty
- Women's rights, equality between genders, the inclusion of women in all spheres of society
- Education and inclusion of youth
- Civil society development, management, and autonomy
- Freedom of organization, of information, of the press, and of religion

== Criticism ==
Alternatives has been criticised as a political organisation supporting "left-leaning causes" through taxpayer funds, provided by the Canadian International Development Agency (CIDA). The Conservative government noted that the Alternatives' board includes "supporters of Hezbollah and Hamas, such as Ali Mallah, vice-president of the Canadian Arab Federation." In addition, the government was reported to have been concerned regarding a 2008 "education camp" at Saint-Alphonse de Rodriguez in Quebec, was attended by "500 motivated militants" from Lebanon, Iraq, and Venezuela.

== Youth Internship Programs ==
Alternatives organizes overseas youth internship programs (such as Alternatives' NetCorps program), with the aim of developing a sense of solidarity and curiosity about other regions within youth. These internships emphasize understanding Third World realities and encouraging actions that will advance Alternatives' message of justice. Thanks to the internships, hundreds of young people have had the opportunity to participate in uncommon professional, cultural, and human experiences.

Alternatives' Internships Program for 2009-2010 offers internships funded by the Québec Sans Frontières Program of Québec's Ministère des relations internationales.

The 2009-2010 Program offered 4 types of internships, under the following 3 themes:

- Communications et journalism: Bolivia: Andale! An environmental voice for workers in Bolivia]

Ecuador: Documentaries for the rights of youth and children in Ecuador

- Environment and urban agriculture: Mali: Roots around the world : urban agriculture in Bamako
- Information and Communication Technologies: Cameroon: When communities take the information highway : education in Yaoundé

Also, one position of the OCI program of Québec Sans Fronitères was available at Alternatives' offices in Montreal:

- Community sector management and institutional development: Assistant to the Québec sans frontières (QSF) program : from Africa to the Americas

As part of the Youth Eco Internship program of YMCA of Canada, Alternatives offered 2 internship positions in Montreal:

- Environment and urban agriculture: Assistant to the environment and urban agriculture program

Urban agriculture mobilization and education officer

== Alternatives in Quebec and Canada ==
Alternatives is an organization that produces and participates in many conferences, that publishes a newspaper and several Web sites, and that organizes educational and informational activities.

The Alternatives newspaper, a monthly compendium of international, national, and cultural news, has a distribution of 50,000, creating a window of alternative information on the world.

Whether in Quebec, Canada, or the world, Alternatives works to raise public awareness of international and local policy debates and keep people informed of the links between them. Through its information and educational campaigns, reflecting our concerns with equality and justice for the South, Alternatives goes beyond the general public to reach policymakers. At the local level, our work involves environmental concerns, participatory democracy, out-reach and solidarity programs with immigrant communities and the promotion of pro-social policies.

For the last 16 years, Alternatives has been hosting the Journées Alternatives, a three-day retreat with Alternatives volunteers at Camp Papillon de St-Alphonse de Rodriguez. The retreat promotes reflection, engagement and education and has hundreds of participants yearly.

== Alternatives' Rooftop Gardens Project in Montreal ==
Since 2003, Alternatives has funded and promoted promotes a Rooftop Garden Project, which has been exploring new ways to interact with urban man-made environment and the food cycle, for a greener city and healthier communities. The Rooftop Garden Project is a combination of hydroponic cultivation, permaculture, organic agriculture and collective gardening. It has inspired numerous initiatives in Québec, Canada and elsewhere in the world.

The new green community spaces have been designed as collective gardens, making participation possible in both public and private areas. This is founded in a desire to offer some simple food production models that are affordable, environmentally friendly and easy to adapt for use in both the South and the North, in a response to growing urbanization, pollution and growing urban poverty.

In 2008, the Rooftop Garden Project earned the highest environmental distinction in Quebec, the Phénix de l’environnement, and received the 2008 National Urban Design Award from the Royal Architectural Institute of Canada, the Canadian Institute of Planners (CIP) and the Canadian Society of Landscape Architects (CSLA) for its collaborative project with McGill University's Minimum Cost Housing Groupe and Santropol Roulant.

== Finances ==
Alternatives garners its financial support from a combination donors and members, as well as partner organizations working alongside Alternatives including major unions and church groups, international organizations and governments.

== Supporters ==
Individuals across Canada contribute to Alternatives either as donors, members, or by subscribing to the newspaper.

Many activists, journalists, and public figures from Quebec, Canada, and the world support Alternatives. Among these are:

- Margaret Atwood, award-winning novelist and poet
- Judy Rebick, politically engaged writer and researcher
- Françoise David, leader of Québec Solidaire, ex-President of the Quebec Federation of Women, co-founder of the World March of Women
- Gil Courtemanche, activist journalist and writer
- Madeleine Parent, feminist and long-time union leader
- Archbishop Desmond Tutu, Nobel Peace Prize winner
- Noam Chomsky, linguist, philosopher, cognitive scientist, and political activist.
