= William Cullen Library =

Coordinates: 26°11′26.09″S 28°1′46.15″E

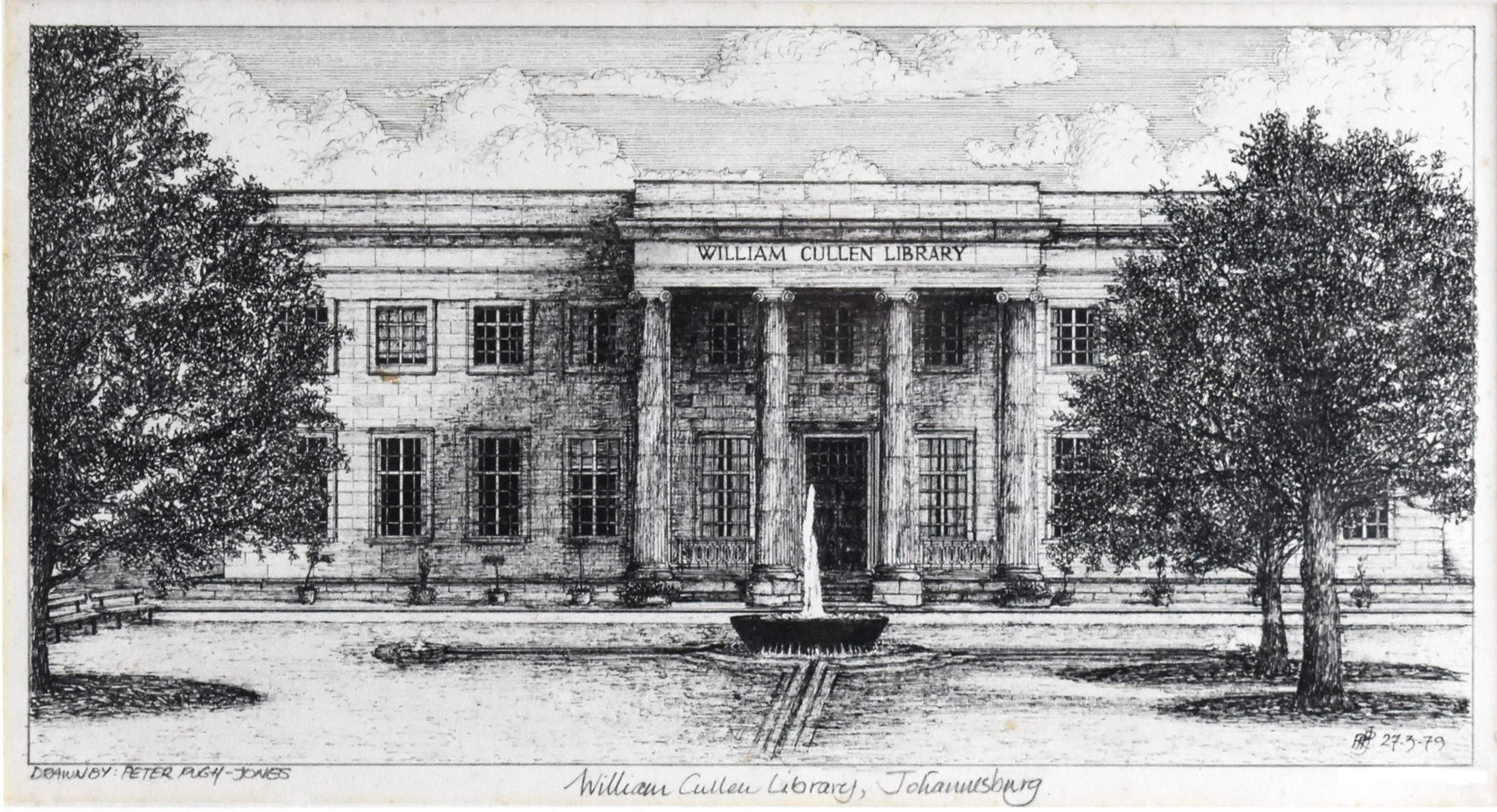
The William Cullen Library

The William Cullen Library is a library located on the East Campus of the University of the Witwatersrand, in Braamfontein, Johannesburg. Opened in March 1934, it stands as one of the university’s oldest and architecturally distinguished buildings, now serving as a research and special collections hub.

== History ==
The library was constructed to replace the university’s original library, which was destroyed in a fire in Central Block on 24 December 1931 along with the law library and half of the Gubbins Afrikana collection were also destroyed. The new building was designed by the architectural firms Emley and Williamson in association with Cowin and Powers. The foundation stone was laid on 10 April 1933 and the building officially opened by Prince George, Duke of Kent, on 12 March 1934. In March 1974, the university named the building in honor of Dr. William Cullen (1867–1948), a Scottish-born chemist and metallurgist who played a key role in fundraising and reconstruction efforts after the fire.

== Architecture and design ==
The William Cullen Library is one of only two buildings in South Africa inspired by the Petit Trianon at Versailles, though the design is interpreted in a more restrained manner. Its façade features a prominent Ionic-columned portico, flanked by tall windows on either side, and is designed to complement the classical features of Central Block.

Internally, the main reading room is a double‑volume space lit by clerestory windows, with flanking single‑volume reading areas and carefully arranged furniture for natural lighting. The basement originally housed stacks and service areas, and while interiors have evolved, the architectural essence largely remains unchanged.

== Collections and functions ==
=== Special collections and archives ===
The Historical Papers Research Archive, located within William Cullen Library and established in 1966, is one of the largest independent archives in Southern Africa. It houses thousands of collections—including the Jan Hofmeyr and Gubbins collections—as well as manuscripts, political papers, personal diaries, photographs, and audiovisual materials. The library also conserves prized artifacts such as fragments of the Diaz Cross and handwritten documents by Nelson Mandela from the Rivonia Trial, displayed occasionally in the foyer. The library houses a collection of academic resources, including: Over 1.5 million print volumes, More than 100,000 electronic journals, a large quantity of digital databases, repositories, and rare and special collections, including the Archives and Special Collections Department.

=== Digitization ===
The library is home to the Wits Digitisation Centre (WDC), officially established in 2012 and now occupying the lower level of the William Cullen Library. The WDC’s guiding motto reflects its dedication to safeguarding digital records and enhancing accessibility for education, research, and lifelong learning. The WDC supports numerous media to be digitized, including bound/unbound documents, books, manuscripts, microfilm, glass plates, artifacts, fabrics, maps, photographic prints, among others.

== Capacity building and outreach ==
In 2018, the Wits‑NRF Digitisation Capacity Development Initiative was launched to build digitization expertise within South Africa and the continent, later resuming in 2022 after COVID-19-related delays. The Centre regularly hosts training workshops—for example, a 2019 Digital Curation workshop led by Paul Weinberg and Azizo Da Fonseca—for technicians, archivists, librarians, photographers, and other heritage professionals. Topics included scanning processes, metadata, copyright, equipment use, and project and preservation standards.
