= MuseuMAfricA =

Museum in Johannesburg, South Africa

Museum Africa
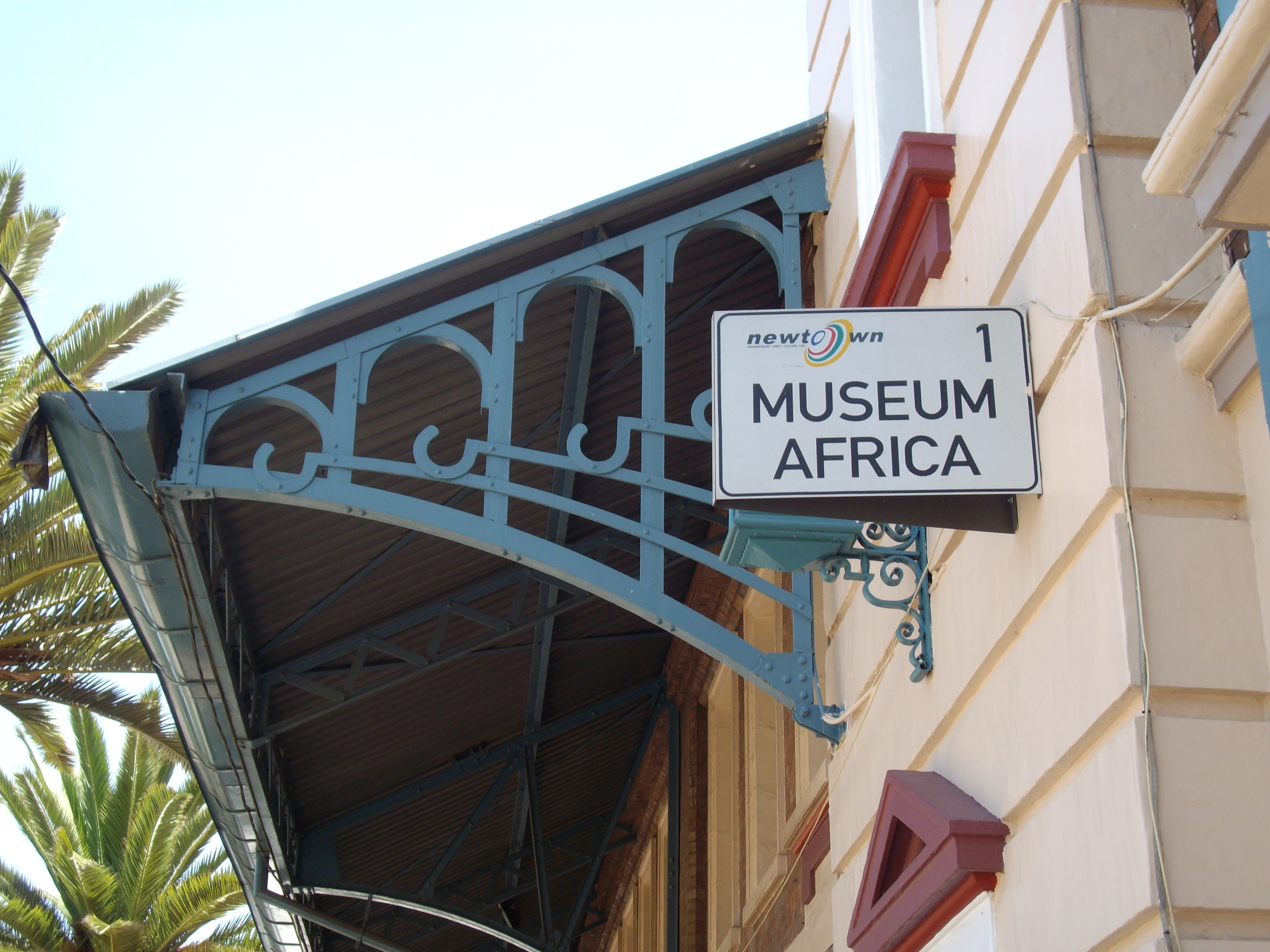
- Sign at the entrance to the Museum Africa

- Location within South Africa
- Former name: Africana Museum (1935–1994)
- Established: 1933; 93 years ago
- Location: Newtown, Johannesburg, South Africa
- Coordinates: 26.2018°S 28.0312°E
- Website: Museumwebsite

Museum Africa or MuseuMAfricA (formerly known as the Africana Museum) is a historical museum in Newtown, Johannesburg, South Africa.

== History ==
The museum was established in 1933, when the Johannesburg Public Library bought a large quantity of Africana material and books from John Gaspard Gubbins. From the mid-1930s, the museum's scope widened to include all aspects of African cultural history and material culture.

The museum regularly published catalogues of the Africana it had in its collections, with titles such as "Military medals of South African interest", "Artists' impressions of Johannesburg, 1886-1956" and "Claudius water-colours in the Africana Museum". From 1943 to 1993 the museum also published the quarterly journal Africana Notes and News.

The museum established the following branch museums: James Hall Museum of Transport, 1964; Bensusan Photographic Museum and Library, 1969; The Museum of South African Rock Art, 1969; and the Bernberg Museum of Costume, 1973. In 1978, it took over the Museum of Man and Science.

In 1994, after the fall of apartheid and the election of a representative democratic government in South Africa, the museum was refurbished and renamed MuseuMAfricA.

MuseuMAfrica launched an exhibit entitled "Never, never again" which led to the establishment of the Hector Pieterson Museum in Soweto. The Apartheid Museum in Gold Reef City was created and run by Christopher Till, former head of the Africana Museum.

== Location ==
The museum is housed in the city's former fruit and vegetable market in Newtown, built in 1913, located opposite Mary Fitzgerald Square, on the same block as the Market Theatre.

== Collections ==
The museum has collections of African material culture from across the continent, including noted collections of tokens, musical instruments and head-rests.

Permanent exhibitions include MyCulture which outlines the different South African cultural and ethnic groups, their origins and how these groups have changed over time;Johannesburg Transformations, highlighting the momentous changes that the city has undergone in its history; and Tried for Treason an exhibition detailing the Rivonia Trial involving 156 defendants, including Nelson Mandela.

The Bensusan Museum of Photography collects rare and valuable precision-made photographic equipment, some dating from the Victorian and Edwardian eras and pictures made using this equipment including wet-plate prints, stereoscopic views and digital images.

The Geology Museum collection consists of over 17 000 rock and mineral samples from Southern Africa, including from the Tsumeb area of Namibia (an area with diverse mineral deposits), the Witwatersrand reefs (a gold mining area), and the Okiep area (a copper mining region).

The Workers' Museum, located two blocks away opposite the Sci-Bono Discovery Centre, is a branch of the museum which tells the story of the migrant labourers who came from across Southern Africa and other parts of the world to work in the gold mines of Johannesburg.

== COVID-19 lockdown theft ==
During the level 1 lockdown imposed on South Africa during the 2020 COVID-19 pandemic, museums were closed along with all such public buildings. In November 2020 a break-in and robbery occurred. No artefacts from the museum were taken but tap fittings and basins were removed, resulting in partial flooding of the museum and possible damage to stored exhibits.
