= Johannesburg City Library =

Library in Johannesburg, South Africa

- "Old Library" (1935)
- 26°12′17″S 28°02′19″E
- Location: Cnr. Albertina Sisulu Streets & Fraser Street, South Africa
- Type: Municipal Public Library
- Established: 1935
- Architect: John Perry

The Johannesburg City Library is situated in the central business district of the City of Johannesburg. The Library is located in an Italianate building designed by John Perry, which first opened in 1935. It has over 1.5 million books and items in its collection and more than 250 000 members.

== History ==
In 1889, a group of prominent Johannesburg residents met to discuss the formation of a public library and eventually formed a committee to raise funds, find a building and order the books. With the books ordered from London, the library opened in June 1890 with the committee members serving as librarians but by February 1891, the library obtained its first librarian, Robert C Hemming. It started as a subscription library, its members paying a subscription to use the facilities. In 1894, the library received a grant from the South African Republic government of £250 though two-thirds of the donation was to be spent on Dutch books though the library was kept funded by means of balls, lectures and donations from the Randlords.

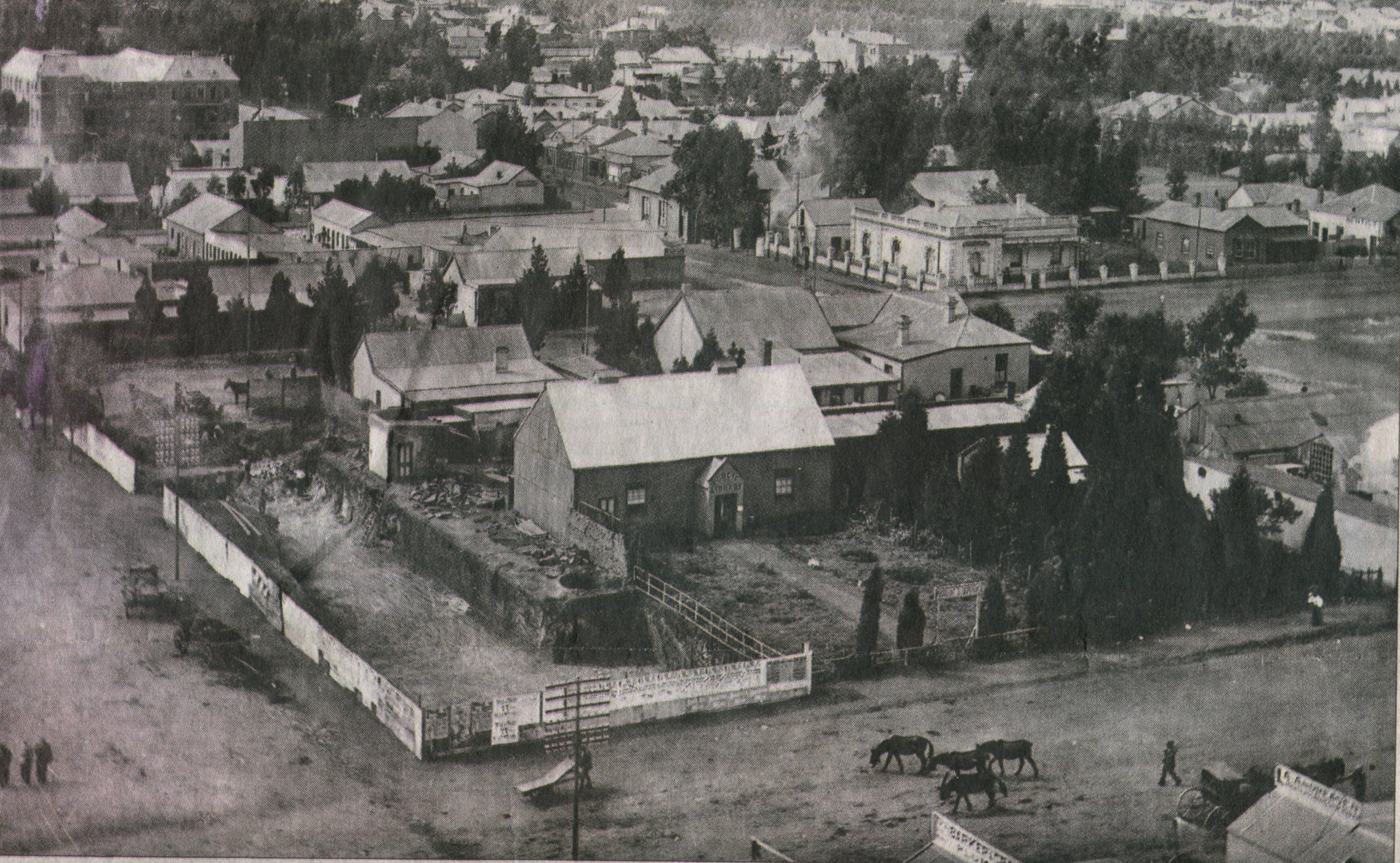
The Johannesburg Library in 1893

The first library was a corrugated iron structure built in 1893 known as the Old Church Building. In 1898, a new structure on Kerk Street was built for the library consisting of three floors with shops on the ground level, the library in the middle and dwelling rooms on the third that allowed rents to fund the buildings mortgage. In October 1899, the Second Anglo-Boer War broke out and the librarian and most of the English inhabitants of Johannesburg fled the Transvaal but a Boer burgher was asked to take care of the library and when the British under Lord Roberts retook the town in 1900, he reopened it and ran it until the librarian could return.

With British management of the Transvaal Colony after 1902, the Johannesburg Town Council was formed and they offered to take control of the library but the members refused but did accept a grant from the council for a free reading room with a limited number of free memberships. Further grants were given over the years and the council obtained membership on the library committee but the library fell into dire financial straits in 1921 after the end of the grants. The council was able to force a vote in 1924, which it won, to establish it as a "free" municipal library. The library was not entirely free with lending tickets issued on the receipt of a returnable cash deposit.

By 1922, the old library building in Kerk Street had taken over the other two floors it used to rent out and the town council offered them the use of land in Market Square if a library and museum were built but on its takeover by the latter in 1924, they would build it and move into the present building and opened on 6 August 1935.

In 1937, after a study of overseas libraries, two branch libraries would be opened, as was a hospital library and its first mobile travelling library as well the cancellation of the returnable cash deposit making it a free library. It would open the Winifred Holtby Memorial Library in the Western Native Township, the first library for black readers. After World War Two, the branch libraries had increased to twenty-nine, with eight hospital and two mobile travelling libraries.

1938 saw the establishment of the Municipal Reference Library for the collection of publication used by local government and housed there until 1952 when it was moved to the Johannesburg City Hall and is now housed on the 12th floor of the Metro Centre in Braamfontein and called the Urban Resource Centre.

By 1960s the library was running short of storage space and the gardens in front of the library were re-excavated to extend the underground stacks and store more than 750,000 books with space for about 20 years. The library did not allow access to other members of different races as it was during apartheid era. In 1974 the Johannesburg library became the first public library to open its doors to all races.

It was closed in 2009 for three years of extensive modernisation by conservation architect, Jonathan Stone and renovated by Fikile Construction. It was reopened to the public on 14 February 2012, on St. Valentine's Day. The renovation was funded with a conditional grant from the Carnegie Corporation of New York of $2-million, and the City of Johannesburg itself spent a further R55-million on the project.

== Architecture ==
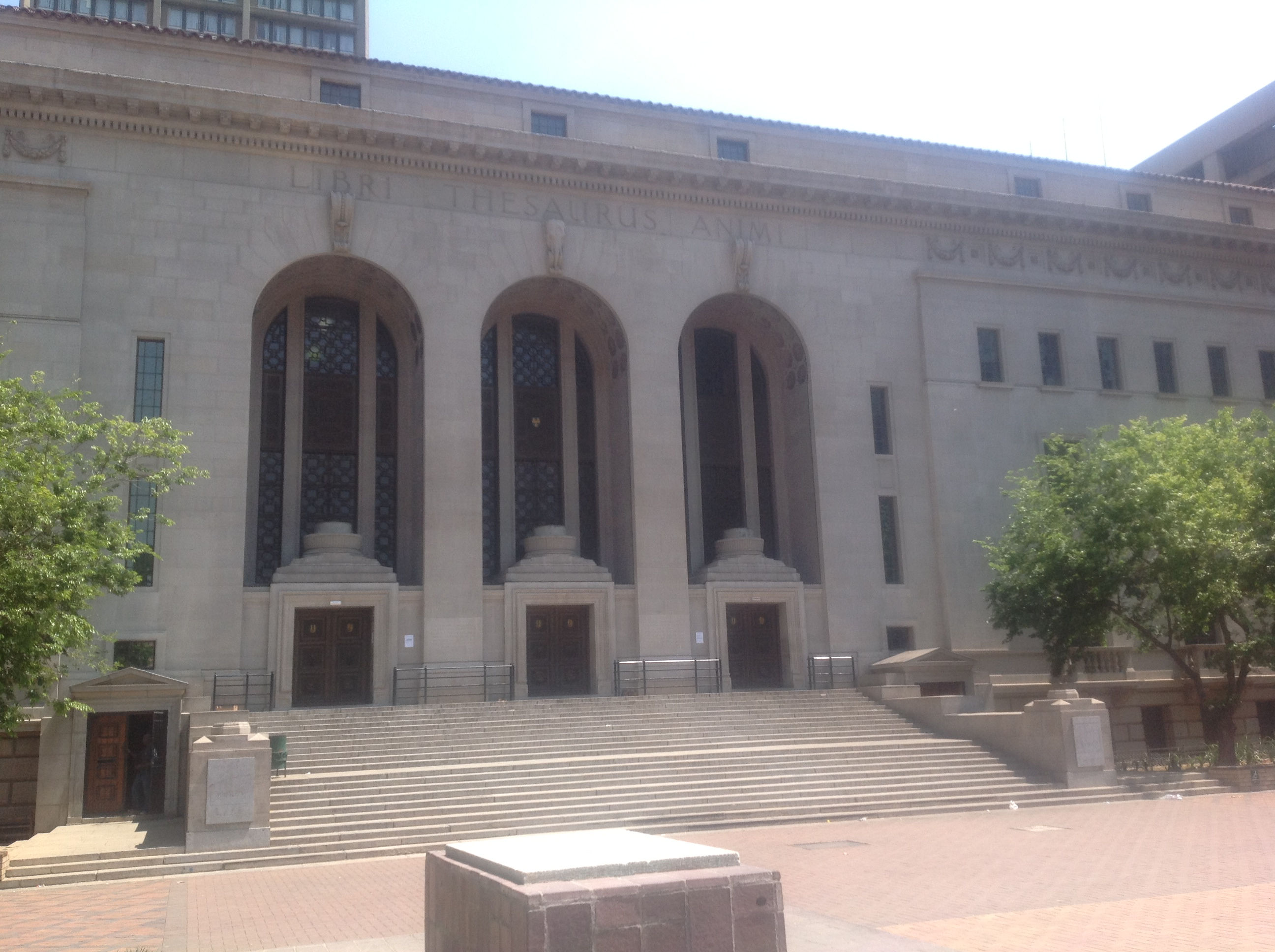
The Johannesburg Library in 2013

The building is an Italianate structure sitting across the road from the ANC's Luthuli House. The construction of the Johannesburg Public Library took place between 1931 and 1935 and was the result of an architectural competition won by Cape Town architect John Perry. The building features a massive and imposing triple-arch, east-facing entrance with metal doors featuring monograms reading "LJ" and "BJ" for the English "Library of Johannesburg" and the Afrikaans "Biblioteek Johannesburg". The northern and southern facades are decorated with stone medallions each carved by Peter Kirchhoff with the face of a great literary, scientific, or philosophical figure. Larger figures designed by Moses Kottler, representing literature, music, architecture, medicine, philosophy, and history surround the building. The building is stone with a terracotta tiled roof. It originally surrounded an atrium, but during the 2009–2012 renovations, a new building was built to fill the atrium with three floors.

== Facilities and collection ==
The library collection consists of about 1.5 million items of some 700,000 books and includes DVDs, CDs, sheet music and periodicals. With the new construction work, the library's size has increased by 1,967m² from 11,198m² and now can accommodate 566 people as opposed to 255 people originally. A new coffee shop has been built and the toilets, lifts, electrics, and air-conditioning upgraded. The new atrium contains three floors. The first two floors is a literacy and numeracy centre containing 212 work stations with free internet access and the third floor is a glassed enclosure designed to house exhibitions. The theatre section is used as a conference venue and the music section is used for listening to music or viewing film.

In addition to the main lending library there is also a number of specialist libraries:

- Central Reference Library
- Children's Library
- Young Adults' Reference Library
- Michaelis Art Library
- Multimedia Library
- Music Library
- Harold Strange Library of African Studies
- Newspaper Reading Room
- Cybase centre

The Music Library collection, created in 1950, has its origins in scores drawn from the lending library and books from the reference library. Money was later set aside to increase the collection. In 1953, the disbanded City Orchestra gave the library a collection of 1,700 orchestral sets, 3,000 vocal scores and miniatures scores.

The Michaelis Art Library was named after its benefactor Sir Max Michaelis, who started the collection off with a donation of £1,000 to purchase art books.

The Strange Collection is based on a collection of 2,300 volumes and books purchased in 1913 from the estate of Harold Fairbrother Strange consisting of books on Africa south of the Zambezi River, and has been expanded upon over the years.

The Johannesburg City Library is open on Mondays to Fridays, from 9 am to 5 pm, and on Saturdays from 9 am to 1 pm.
