= Johannesburg City Hall =

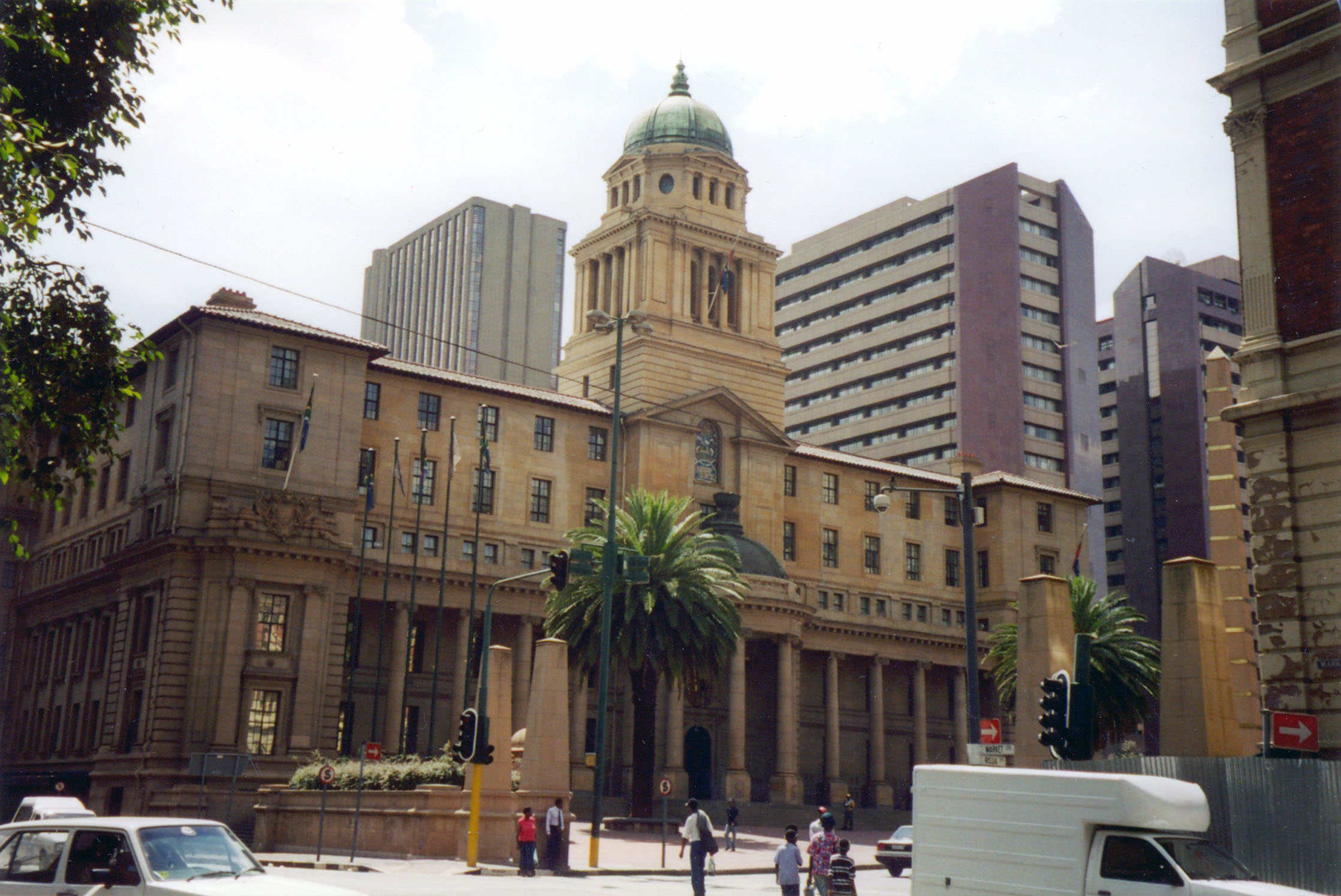
- A view of the Johannesburg city hall from Rissik Street
- Interactive map of the Johannesburg City Hall area

General information
- Status: Completed
- Location: Johannesburg, South Africa
- Coordinates: 26°12′16″S 28°2′30″E
- Current tenants: Gauteng Provincial Legislature
- Construction started: 1912
- Completed: 1914
- Opening: 1915
- Owner: Gauteng Provincial Government

Technical details
- Floor count: 4
- Lifts/elevators: 2

Design and construction
- Architects: Hawkey & McKinley
- Main contractor: Mattheus Meischke

Johannesburg City Hall is an Edwardian building constructed in 1914 by the Hawkey and McKinley construction company. The plan for the building was drawn in 1910 and construction was started in 1913 and finished in 1914. The Gauteng Provincial Legislature currently occupies the building. The City Hall has seen many political events on its steps from protest meetings to a bomb blast in 1988.

== History ==
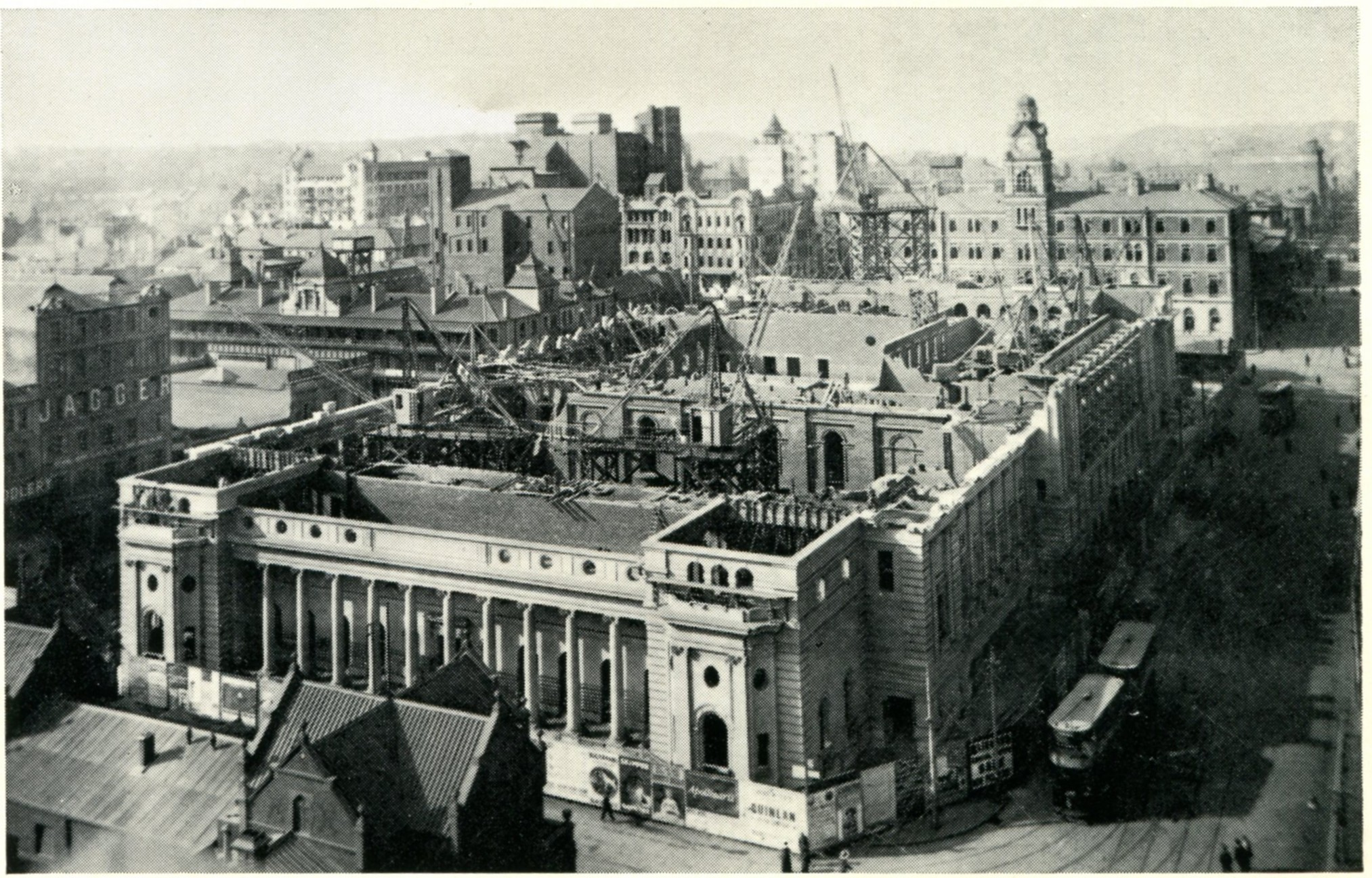
The Johannesburg city hall while still under construction

A competition was held in 1909 to design a new Town Hall. Only South African resident architects were allowed to take part and entries were judged by Leonard Stokes, Vice-President of the Royal Institute of British Architects and a decision was made in March 1910. A Cape Town architectural firm, Hawke and McKinlay, won the competition to design the new building but it took until 17 February 1912 before Mattheus Meischke was awarded the tender to construct the building which would cost £503,000. The site chosen was the eastern end of Market Square where one half was purchased by the Johannesburg Town Council from the South African Government and then latter donated the other half on condition that a town hall was built. On 29 November 1910, the Town Hall's corner stone was laid by Prince Arthur, Duke of Connaught and Strathearn on land previously known as Market Square. Completed in December 1914, the Town Hall was officially opened on 7 April 1915 by the South African Governor-General Lord Buxton having been presented a golden key by the builder, Mattheus Meischke, with the building open to the public for two days. The building was officially in use earlier, having opened on 26 January 1915.

On 5 September 1928, Johannesburg was proclaimed a city by the Administrator of the Transvaal, J.H. Hofmeyer in front of a crowd gathered in the square of the now City Hall. In 1937, the City Hall would undergo further construction when the tower was dismantled and an additional floor was added to the building and then the tower rebuilt. On 12 October 1979, City Hall was designated a National Monument. After the 1994 South African elections, the Gauteng Provincial Legislature moved from Pretoria to Johannesburg and on 21 October 1995 the City Hall would become its new home. The Johannesburg City Council sold the City Hall in November 2001 for R20-million to the Gauteng Provincial Legislature with legal transfer occurring in 2003. The sale of the City Hall also included the Harry Hofmeyr Parking Garage, the archive areas of the Johannesburg City Library and the Beyers Naude Gardens which lies between the library and the hall.

== Old building design ==
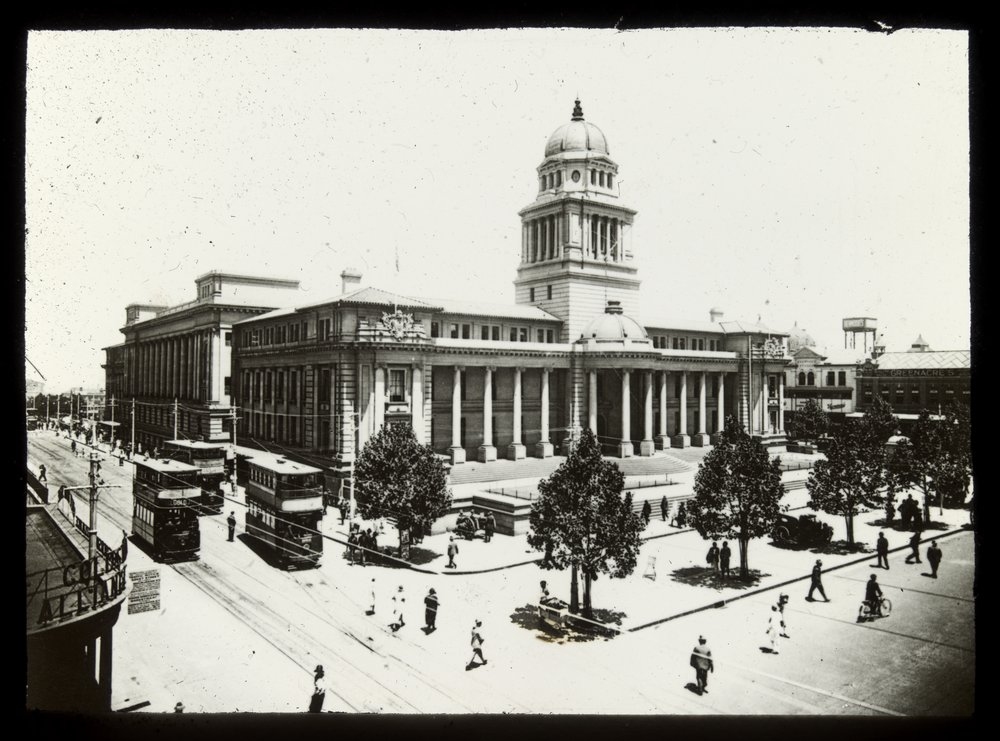
The Johannesburg City Hall prior to 1937 rebuild

The style is described as Edwardian Baroque with a portico of Ionic columns and tower with a half dome entrance described as neo-Renaissance. The building is designed as two-halves, with the eastern side consisting of the municipal offices which faces Rissik Street and the western side containing the Town Hall facing Harrison Street.

Sixty metres from the main entrance on Rissik Street is a small stone paved square originally with flower boxes. During the Civic Spine project of 1989–91, Rissik Street between the City Hall and The Post Office was bent in front of the square to accommodate a fountain and obelisks in the centre of the road. Granite steps lead up to the entrance consisting of a colonnaded portico along the full front of the building and with a central domed tower above. The entrance vestibule of marble and mosaics had corridors leading left and right to municipal departments while a marble staircase lead up to the first floor which consisted of the council chamber, committee rooms, councillor's library and lobby with Mayor's parlour facing the square. The council chamber was domed with ornamental plaster and oak finishes with the committee rooms with a similar finish. On the ground floor below the council chamber was the Rates Hall which was accessed from the north and south sides of the building in President and Market Streets. The building originally had an open courtyard in the centre.

The western entrance in President Street faces the now renamed Beyers Naude Square with the Johannesburg City Library beyond that. From that street are five doors to the entrance hall and the town hall beyond, while two staircases on either side lead up to gallery while in the hall itself, the Organ faces the entrance. The hall is decorated in plaster, gilding, and woodwork. Accessed from President Street, Selborne Hall is found on the first floor. The organ for the new hall was built by Noman & Beard of Norwich based on the specifications of Dr Alfred Hollins. The organ was assembled by A.M.F Tomkins of Cooper, Gill and Tomkins under Herbert Norman's supervision. The organ was first opened to the public on 4 March 1916 with an inaugural recital by Alfred Hollins. In the 1920s it was used to present recitals on Sunday nights and during the lunch hour on Tuesdays afternoon. The organ was said to be the largest on the continent of Africa and was at one time the second largest organ in the Southern Hemisphere.

The external walls are brick but clad in sawn border stone from the Free State called Flatpan Freestone. Some of roof is tiled, originally of green Spanish tiles but are now clad in red tiles replicated in Pretoria, while other parts of the roof are cement and corrugated iron. The internal walls consist of plaster, mahogany, oak and teak depending on the location and the rooms uses. While the floor material differs on the location and its uses and could consist of marble, mosaics, American cork and maple.
