= Nelson Mandela Bridge =

Bridge in Johannesburg, South Africa

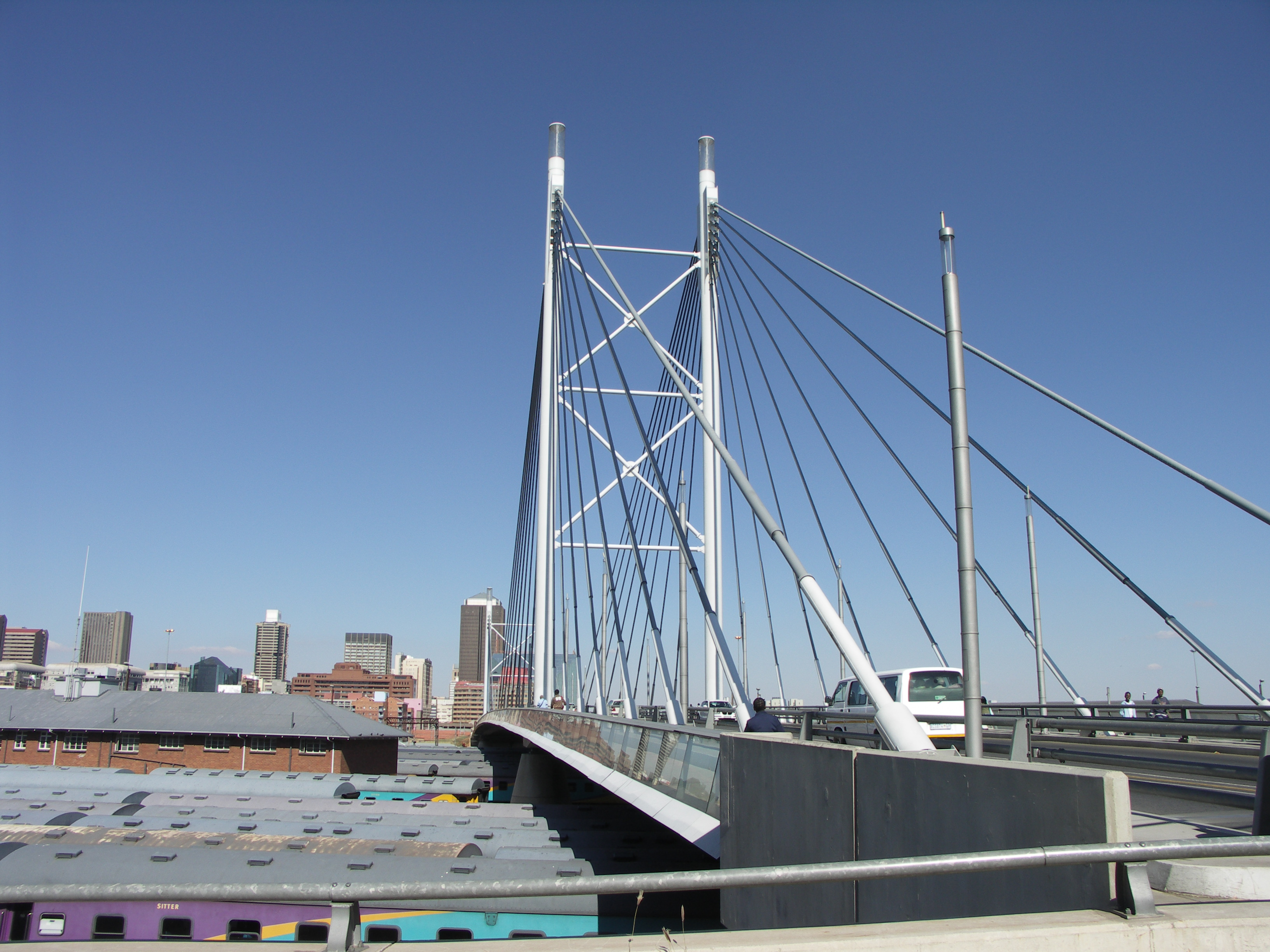
- Coordinates: 26.1967°S 28.0342°E
- Carries: Road and pedestrian traffic
- Crosses: Railway yard (42 lines)
- Locale: Johannesburg

Characteristics
- Design: Dissing+Weitling
- Total length: 284m
- Height: 27m
- Longest span: 176m

History
- Opened: 20 July 2003; 23 years ago

Location
- Interactive map of Nelson Mandela Bridge

Nelson Mandela Bridge is a bridge in Johannesburg, South Africa. It is the fourth of five bridges which cross the railway lines and sidings located just west of Johannesburg Park Station, the first being the Johan Rissik Bridge adjacent to the station. It was completed in 2003, and cost R38 million to build. The proposal for the bridge was to link up two main business areas of Braamfontein and Newtown as well as to rejuvenate and to a certain level modernise the inner city. The bridge forms part of the M27 Route of Johannesburg. Nelson Mandela Bridge was the longest suspension bridge in Southern Africa, for 21 years, until it was overtaken by the Msikaba Bridge.

== History ==
A bridge linking Braamfontein to the Johannesburg city centre was first mooted by Steve Thorne and Gordon Gibson, urban designers, in 1993 in their urban design study of the Inner City of Johannesburg. In their study they named the bridge the Nelson Mandela bridge in recognition of the role Nelson Mandela was having in uniting South African society, and the symbolism of linkage and unity provided by the bridge.

== Design ==
The bridge was constructed over 42 railway lines without disturbing railway traffic and is 284 metres long.There are two pylons, North and South, 42 and 27 metres high respectively. Engineers tried to keep the bridge as light as possible and used a structural steel with a concrete composite deck to keep weight down. Heavier banks along the bridge were reinforced by heavier back spans. The bridge consists of two lanes and has pedestrian walk-ways on either side. The bridge can be viewed from one of Johannesburg's most popular roads, the M1 highway. 4,000 cubic metres of concrete and 1,000 tons of structural steel were used to construct the bridge. The bridge is lit in rainbow colours at night.

== Public use and events ==
The bridge is frequently used as a site for public demonstrations and symbolic displays due to its central location and high visibility within Johannesburg. Various civic, political, and social groups have held gatherings on the bridge to draw public attention to their causes.

In October 2023 and January 2026, crowds gathered on the bridge to raise awareness of Israeli hostages held in Gaza following the October 7 attacks by Hamas on Israel, during which thousands of civilians were killed, including hundreds at the Nova music festival.
