= Mvuyo Tom =

South African doctor, administrator and academic

Mvuyo Tom is a South African doctor, administrator and academic, known for his tenure as the vice-chancellor of the University of Fort Hare from 2008 to 2016.

== Career ==
Tom was trained as a medical doctor, before moving into public health management in the Eastern Cape, ultimately serving for six years as the director general of the region's health and welfare department. In 1994, Tom was awarded the Nelson Mandela Award for Health and Human Rights.

Tom was appointed as the director of the School of Public Management and Development at the University of Fort Hare in 2005, and went on to become the university's vice-chancellor in 2008, taking over from Professor Derrick Swarz. During his tenure as vice-chancellor, Tom commented publicly on the Fees Must Fall movement, comparing the damage being done to university campuses to the Xhosa cattle killing in the 1850s. He stood down as vice-chancellor, and was appointed a professor by the university, in 2016, to be replaced by the current incumbent, Sakhela Buhlungu.

Tom currently serves as deputy chairperson on the board of Tekano Health Equity in South Africa, and he also serves on the board of the Oliver and Adelaide Tambo Foundation.

Academic offices
Preceded by DI Swartz	Vice-Chancellor of the University of Fort Hare; 2008−2016	Succeeded by Sakhela Buhlungu
