= Sakhela Buhlungu =

South African sociologist

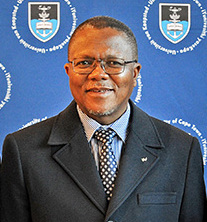
- Occupation: Sociology

Academic background
- Education: University of Transkei; University of Cape Town; University of the Witwatersrand
- Thesis: Democracy and modernisation in the making of the South African trade union movement: the dilemma of leadership, 1973 - 2000 (2001)

Academic work
- Institutions: University of Fort Hare

Maxwell Sakhela Buhlungu is a South African sociology professor and university administrator. He is the current vice chancellor of University of Fort Hare and the former dean of humanities at University of Cape Town. Buhlungu's work focuses on the labour and other social movements. He has also taught at the University of the Witwatersrand, the University of Johannesburg, and the University of Pretoria. At Fort Hare, his efforts to combat corruption lead to threats that culminated in a January 2023 assassination attempt that killed his bodyguard. Before academia, Buhlungu worked as a teacher and was the assistant general secretary of the Paper, Printing and Allied Workers' Union.

== Education and early career ==
Buhlungu grew up in a large family in the Eastern Cape. His father was a migrant worker at the mines in Brakpan. Buhlungu went to boarding school at Jongilizwe College, where his favourite teacher was Dumisa Ntsebeza. Buhlungu earned his Bachelor of Arts in 1982 at the University of Transkei and worked as a teacher at Manzana High School in Engcobo in the Eastern Cape from 1983 to 1984. He became involved in the South Africa labour movement in the early 1980s.

Buhlungu obtained a BA honours in African studies at the University of Cape Town (UCT) in the 1985–1986 academic year. At UCT he was part of the International labour research and information group, and studied Third World labour movements. In 1987, Buhlungu stopped working towards a Master's degree in history to work as an education officer in the Paper, Printing and Allied Workers' Union, which is affiliated with the Congress of South African Trade Unions. He eventually became the union's assistant general secretary. Buhlungu resumed his graduate studies in 1992 and transitioned from a functionary position in his union to an editorial one, becoming the editor of COSATU's Shopsteward journal.

== Academia and university administration ==
Buhlungu's work focuses on trade unions and social movements. In 1994, he left Shopsteward and became a researcher for the Sociology of Work programme at the University of the Witwatersrand (Wits). The same year, he joined the editorial board of the South African Labour Bulletin. At Wits, he earned a masters in industrial sociology in 1996 and PhD in sociology in 2002. Buhlungu's PhD thesis focused on the tensions between democratic control and organisational efficiency in running trade unions.

Buhlungu started teaching at Wits in 1996 as a sociology lecturer. That year, Buhlungu also served as a member of the Presidential Commission to investigate the Development of Comprehensive Labour Markets. In 1998-99, he was on the Council of the South African Sociological Association. In 2000, Buhlungu was on the board of directors of the Workers' Library and Museum. He has also been on editorial board for Labour Markets and Social Frontiers, the journal of the South African Reserve Bank, since 2001. In 2002, he became the newsletter editor for the International Sociological Association's Research Committee on Labour Movements.

In 2005, Buhlungu was a visiting scholar at the University of Massachusetts Amherst as part of the Five Colleges African Scholars’ Program. From 2006 to 2007, he was head of the Department of Sociology at Wits, where he was also the co-director of the Sociology of Work Programme. In January 2008, Buhlungu resigned from Wits after he felt that his concerns about corruption and theft by the sociology department's administrative staff were rejected. After his resignation, Wits vice chancellor Loyiso Nongxa launched a commission of inquiry into the claims. Buhlungu then became professor of sociology at University of Johannesburg.

Later, Buhlungu became a professor at the University of Pretoria, where he was appointed deputy dean for postgraduate studies and ethics in the faculty of humanities in November 2012 for a term starting in January 2013. From 2011–2012, he was the Ela Bhatt Visiting Professor in the International Centre for Development and Decent Work at the University of Kassel in Germany. At Pretoria, Buhlungu temporarily filled in as the head of his department in 2013, which prompted him to pivot towards university administration positions.

Buhlungu joined the University of Cape Town in November 2013 to familiarize himself with the institution before his appointment as dean of the faculty of humanities the following February. In 2015, Buhlungu criticized South African universities for counting international scholars from African countries – especially those who achieved independence far before the end of apartheid – in the same equity category as black South African scholars as hypocritical amidst a period of zero or declining growth in the number of the latter group.

=== Vice Chancellorship at the University of Fort Hare ===
In November 2016, Buhlungu was appointed as vice-chancellor of the University of Fort Hare (UFH), succeeding Mvuyo Tom at the start of 2017. He first reported an instance of possible corruption at UFH to South Africa's Special Investigating Unit in 2018. By May 2018, Buhlungu had to be assigned 24-hour security because of threats over his efforts to reduce corruption and fraud at the university.

In July 2018, a whistleblower alleged that Buhlungu had been in a relationship with an employee that he later promoted; both Buhlungu and the employee denied the accusation. Buhlungu suspended the head of the university's internal audit unit for refusing to disclose two investigations into corruption at the university before the end of the year. At the time, the investigation into the alleged affair was in the hands of an external investigator who reported to the chief auditor executive. In March 2019, UFH's audit and risk committee recommended suspending Buhlungu for undermining the committee and the university council and that the suspension of the audit head was not within his powers, while Buhlungu issued a statement that there were ongoing investigations into the conduct of the audit team.

On 12 April 2019, a meeting of 9 out of 31 members of the university council, including the chair of the audit and risk committee, convened, declared quorum, and passed multiple resolutions, including suspending Buhlungu. Later that month, after the dispute was reported by the press, the university's council was dissolved and UFH was put under government administration by Higher Education Minister Naledi Pandor for 12 months because of concerns about poor governance. Loyiso Nongxa, former Wits vice-chancellor was appointed as administrator, while Buhlungu remained as vice chancellor and retained his responsibility over managing university affairs.

An independent assessment prepared for Nongxa by Chris Brink and Louis Molamu cleared Buhlungu of the whistleblower allegations in a December 2019 report. The report also criticized the suspended university council of factionalism that undermined the vice chancellor. However, they recommended that a grievance process, such as an ombudsman, be implemented to assuage those concerned about potential abuses of power. Nongxa praised the report for providing a roadmap for Buhlungu's efforts to reform the university.

In November 2021, Buhlungu was reappointed to a second term as vice chancellor. In March 2022, Buhlungu's home was attacked by gun fire and police opened an attempted murder case. Two months later, in May 2022, Buhlungu’s former fleet and transport manager, Petrus Roets, was killed in a suspected hit job after he testified in a disciplinary hearing against a fellow employee. Restricted by the statutory limits on the university's investigating powers, Buhlungu convinced South African President Cyril Ramaphosa to sign a proclamation in August 2022 authorizing the Special Investigating Unit to investigate corruption and maladministration at Fort Hare. Buhlungu was a key collaborator with the law enforcement agency.

On 6 January 2023, Buhlungu survived an assassination attempt. Mboneli Vesele, who headed Buhlungu’s security detail and also served as his driver, was fatally shot while in a car outside Buhlungu’s home in Alice, Eastern Cape. Buhlungu's passenger seat was also shot at, but he had been dropped off earlier and was not in the car at the time. A vehicle with false number plates, suspected to have been involved in the shooting, was later recovered by the police. After the assassination attempt, President Ramaphosa condemned the attack and promised that he would meet with Buhlungu. Other officials condemning the attack included Blade Nzimande, the Minister of Higher Education, Science and Technology; Oscar Mabuyane, the Eastern Cape Premier; and Professor Sibongile Muthwa, the chairperson of Universities South Africa. On 11 January, Nzimande announced that Fort Hare would be one of the universities studied in-depth by an upcoming task force on post-secondary education safety and security. Buhlungu spoke at Vesele's funeral service on 14 January, calling him a brother and confidant.

Academic offices
Preceded by Mvuyo Tom	Vice-Chancellor of the University of Fort Hare; 2016−	Incumbent
