= Constitution Hill, Johannesburg =

Building in South Africa

Coordinates: 26°11′19″S 28°2′34″E

Constitution Hill

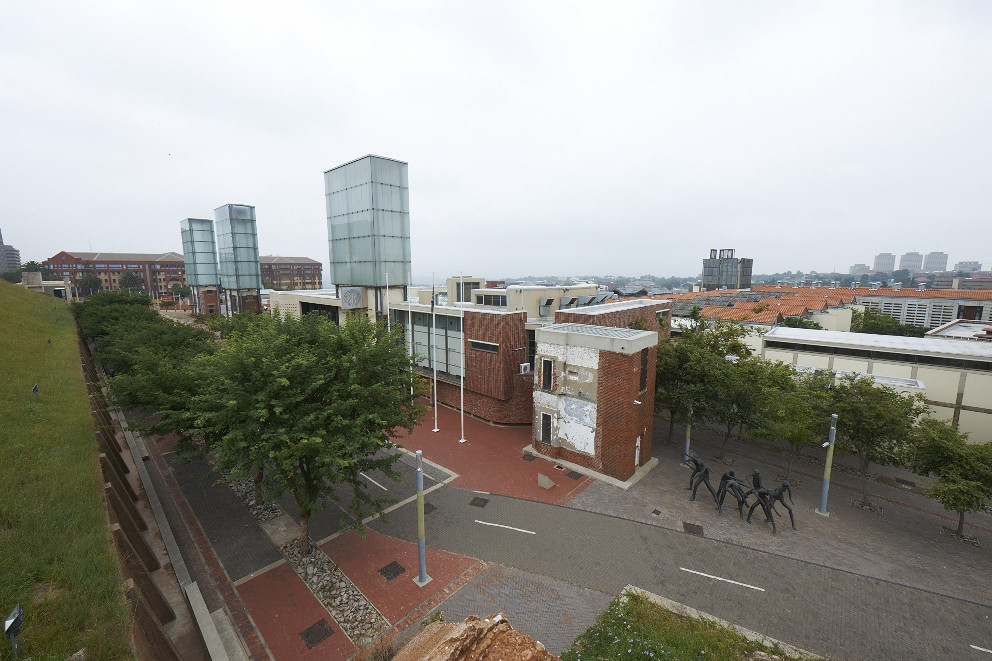
- Established: Old Fort - 1899; 127 years ago
- Location: Braamfontein, Johannesburg
- Website: Constitution Hill

UNESCO World Heritage Site
- Official name: Human Rights, Liberation and Reconciliation: Nelson Mandela Legacy Sites
- Designated: 2024 (46th session)
- Reference no.: 1676

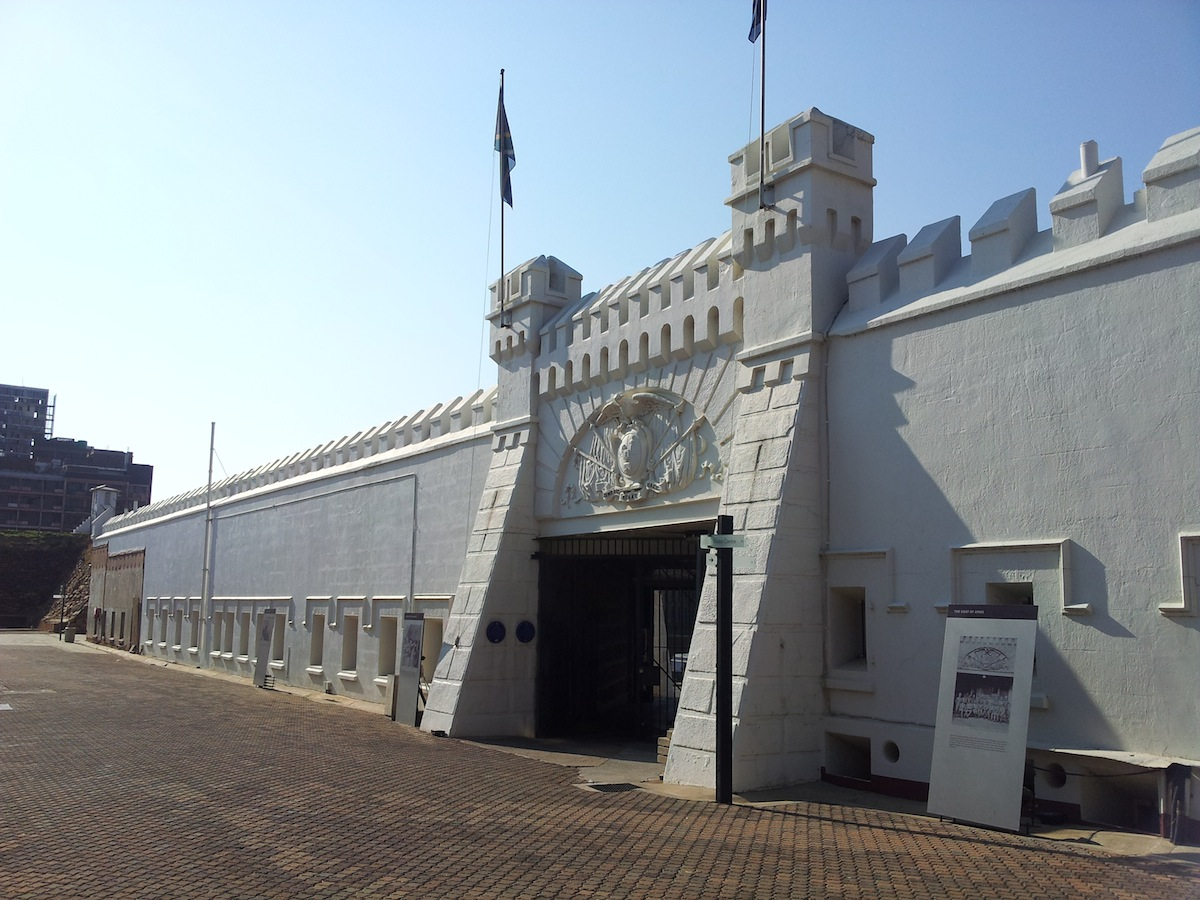
The Old Fort

The Constitution Hill precinct is the seat of the Constitutional Court of South Africa. It is located in Braamfontein, a suburb of Johannesburg, near the western end of the suburb of Hillbrow. The complex consists of the Constitutional Court, the Old Fort Prison and a museum.

In 2024 the Constitution Hill became a World Heritage Site, one of 14 component parts spread across South Africa known collectively as the "Nelson Mandela Legacy Sites".

== History ==
The hill was formerly the site of a fort which was later used as a prison. The Old Fort Prison complex is known as Number Four. The original prison was built to house white male prisoners in 1892. The Old Fort was built around this prison by Paul Kruger from 1896 to 1899 to protect the South African Republic from the threat of British invasion. Later, Boer military leaders of the Anglo-Boer War were imprisoned here by the British.

The Old Fort prison was later extended to include "native" cells, called Section 4 and Section 5, and, in 1907, a women's section was added, the Women's Gaol. An awaiting-trial block was constructed in the 1920s. Both political activists opposed to apartheid and common criminals were held at the prison, and striking white mineworkers in 1907, 1913 and 1922. During the apartheid era the prison complex became a detention centre for political dissidents opposed to apartheid, striking white mineworkers (in 1907, 1913 and 1922), those deemed "anti-establishment" and those who simply violated the pass laws of the time. Mahatma Gandhi was imprisoned here in 1906. Nelson Mandela, Joe Slovo, Bram Fischer, Albert Lutuli and Robert Sobukwe are some of its famous prisoners. For this reason it was also called "The Robben Island of Johannesburg" due to how infamous it became as a result of holding these political prisoners. The site housed prisoners until 1983, when it was closed.

Activists were usually held as awaiting trial prisoners and then sent off to Robben Island or Pretoria to serve jail terms. Brewing beer – an illegal activity if you were black – also landed many women in jail, a situation depicted in the Women Gaol. Still others were arrested for having sex across the colour bar or for homosexual sex. Amongst the practices reported during detention, the humiliating "Tauza" dance, the beatings in the notorious Number Four prison for black men, the detention for months in dirty, overcrowded conditions in the Awaiting Trial Block, or being stripped of their underclothes and their dignity in the Women's Gaol.

The Old Fort was declared a National Monument in 1964 although it continued as a functioning prison until 1987, after which the buildings and the site as a whole suffered from neglect and vandalism. Constitution Hill opened as a museum in 2004, with tours taking the visitors to three prison museums: Number Four, the Women's Gaol and the Old Fort. The site also features the Constitutional Court and the court's collection of 200 South African artworks.

== Flame of Democracy ==
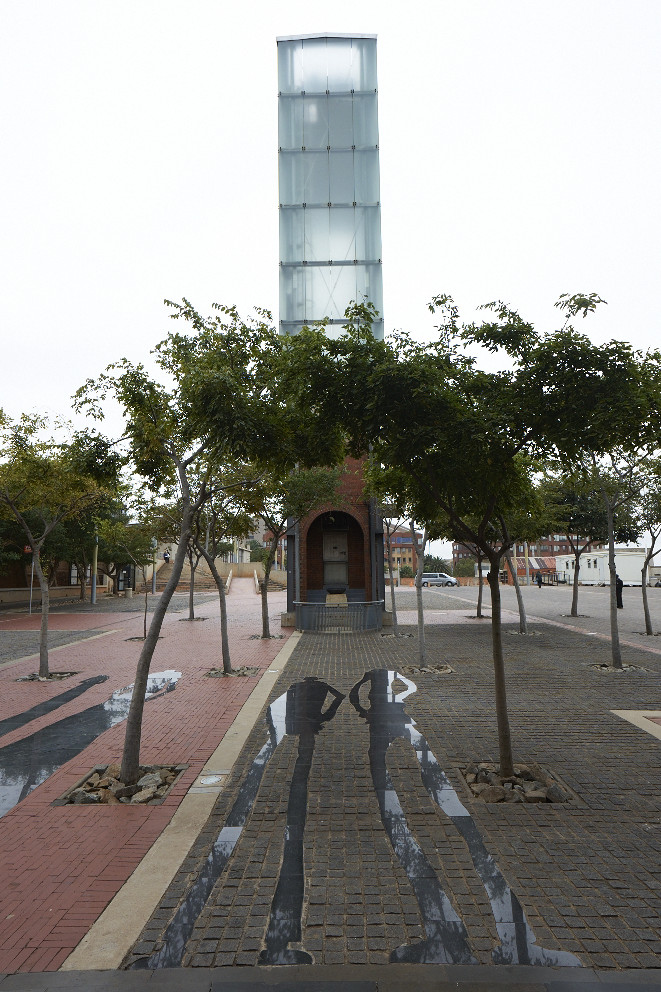
An eternal flame burning on Constitution Hill in Johannesburg, South Africa

Outside the wooden doors of the court building, in the middle of a plaza and built into one of the stairwells of the old prison is the Flame of Democracy. The Flame was lit on 10 December 2011 when South Africa celebrated the 15th anniversary of the signing of the constitution.

== Constitutional Court ==
In 1995, the Constitutional Court justices began looking for a permanent location for the new Court. The new court building was built using bricks from the demolished awaiting-trial wing of the former number 4 prison. Most of the prison has been demolished to make way for the new court, but the stairwells have been kept and incorporated into the new building as a reminder of how South Africa has overcome the dark days of oppression. The first court session in the new building at this location was held in February 2004. The court building is open to the public who want to attend hearings or view the art gallery in the court atrium. The court also houses an art gallery with a collection of more than 200 contemporary artworks chosen by Constitutional Court Judge Albie Sachs, including works by Gerard Sekoto, William Kentridge, and Cecil Skotnes.

The hill overlooks downtown Johannesburg to the South and the wealthy northern suburbs such as Houghton Estate, Parktown, and Sandton to the North.

== Old Fort prison buildings ==
The Old Fort prison buildings were built from 1896 to 1899. They were created by the Boers for the specific purpose of holding captive British invaders. During the Anglo-Boer War, however, the British seized Johannesburg and converted the Old Fort prison buildings for the incarceration of Boers, some of whom were executed there. Even prominent Boer leaders of the Anglo-Boer War were imprisoned here by the British soon after the British had succeeded in seizing and controlling Johannesburg.

Under the apartheid government, only whites were held in the Old Fort prison buildings, except for Nelson Mandela, who was kept there after the government received a tip-off regarding an escape attempt. Mandela was given a bed in the hospital section as an awaiting-trial prisoner in 1962 prior to the Rivonia Trial.

In the old prison blocks visitors can learn more about South Africa's difficult path towards freedom and democracy from the permanent museum exhibitions that include personal testimonies from former prisoners and warders and installations.

=== Number 4 ===
Number Four also called ''Native Prison'' is the section of the Old Fort complex that was reserved for black men. Number Four was once home to prisoners such as Mahatma Gandhi, Robert Sobukwe and the students of the 1976 Soweto uprising.

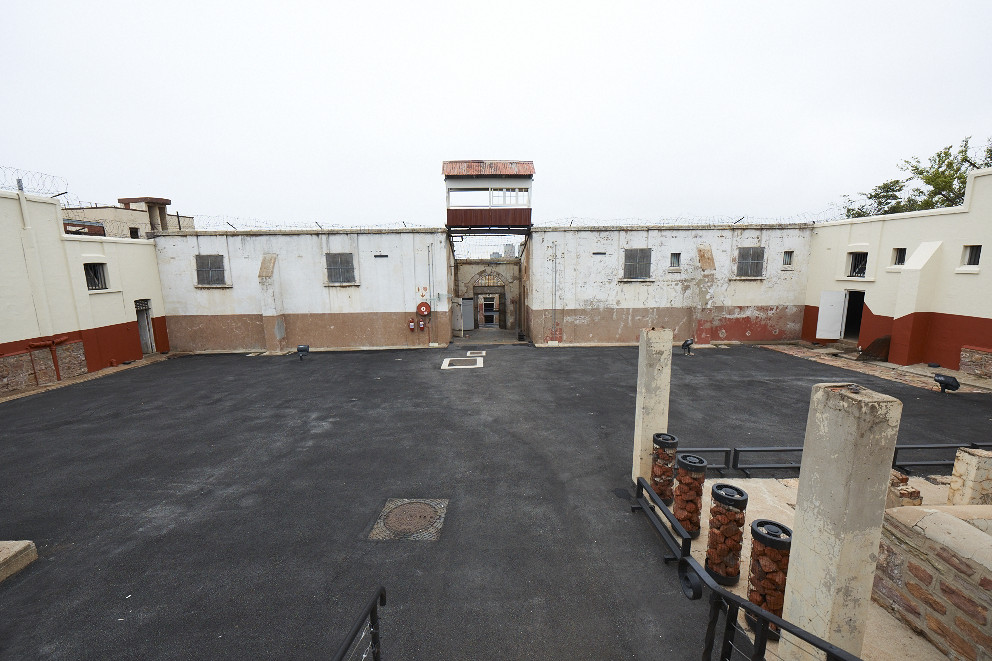
Number 4

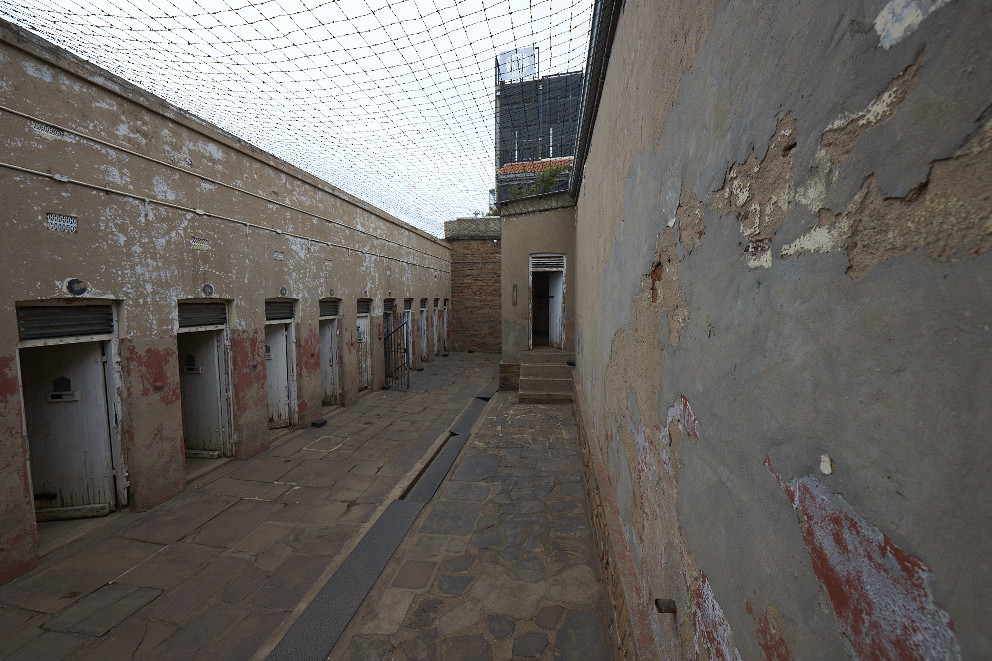
Isolation cells at Number 4

=== Women's Gaol ===
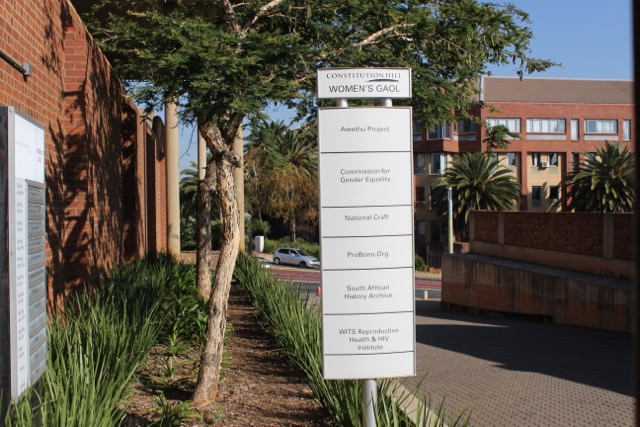
The contemporary entrance to the Women's Gaol complex

The Constitution Hills Women's Gaol was built in 1909, as a Victorian-style building, with separate sections for whites and other races. Treatment meted out on prisoners here were largely with regard to their racial background. The white prisoners were given better treatment as compared to other races who were crowded in their cells with bad and inadequate sanitary conditions.

Some of the notable prisoners who were once imprisoned here include Winnie Mandela and Albertina Sisulu who were both political activists and were arrested on account of their activities with the African National Congress. In 1932, Daisy de Melker, who poisoned her two husbands and her son, was imprisoned here. She was later convicted for murder and executed by hanging.

In 1983, women's imprisonment and its related activities were discontinued at the building. The edifice was later converted to a women's centre.

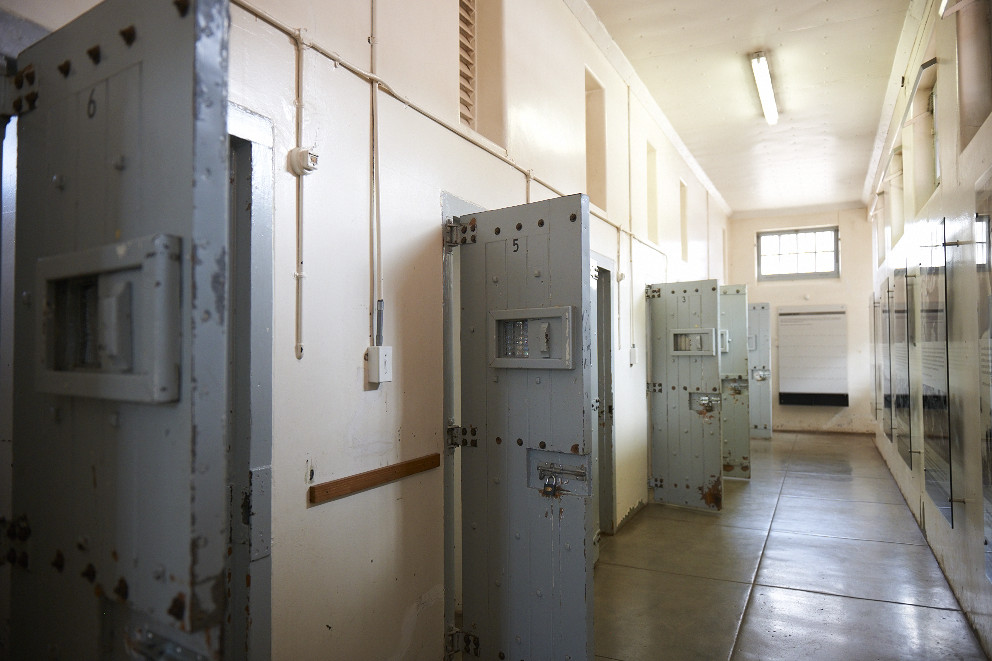
The isolation cells at the Women's Gaol.

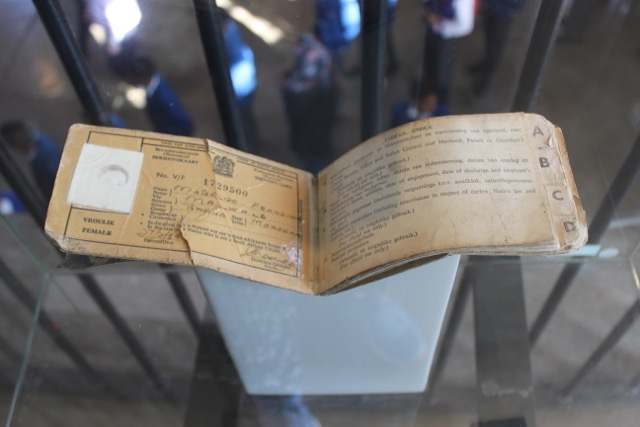
A pass book or Dompass, exhibited as an artefact of Apartheid at the Women's Gaol.

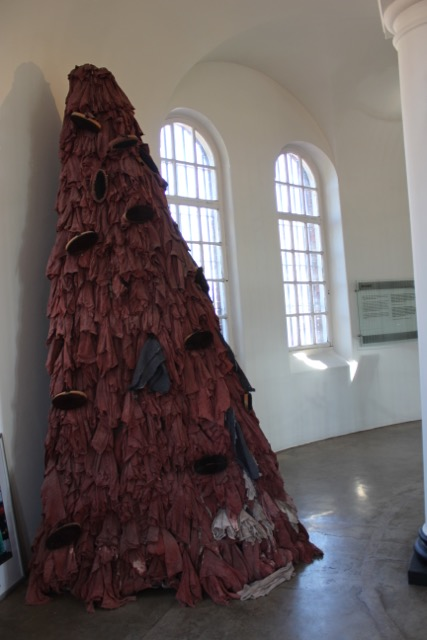
A sculptural representation of brushes and cloths that exhibit the conditions at the Women's Gaol.

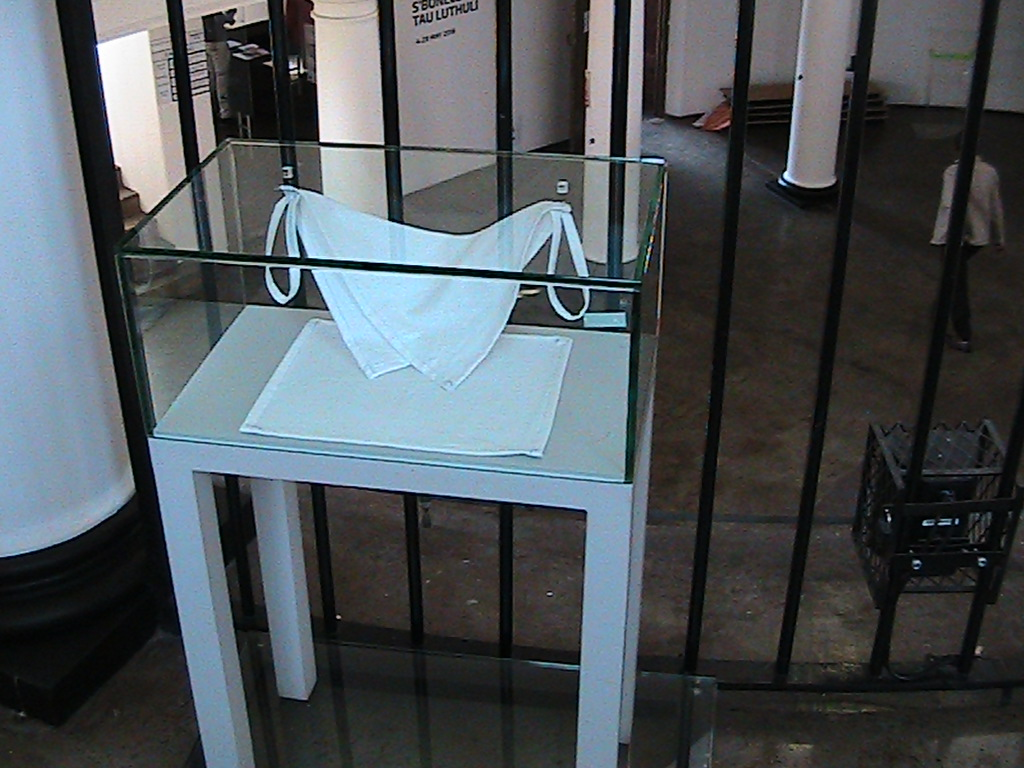
The Sanitary Pad used by women in prison.

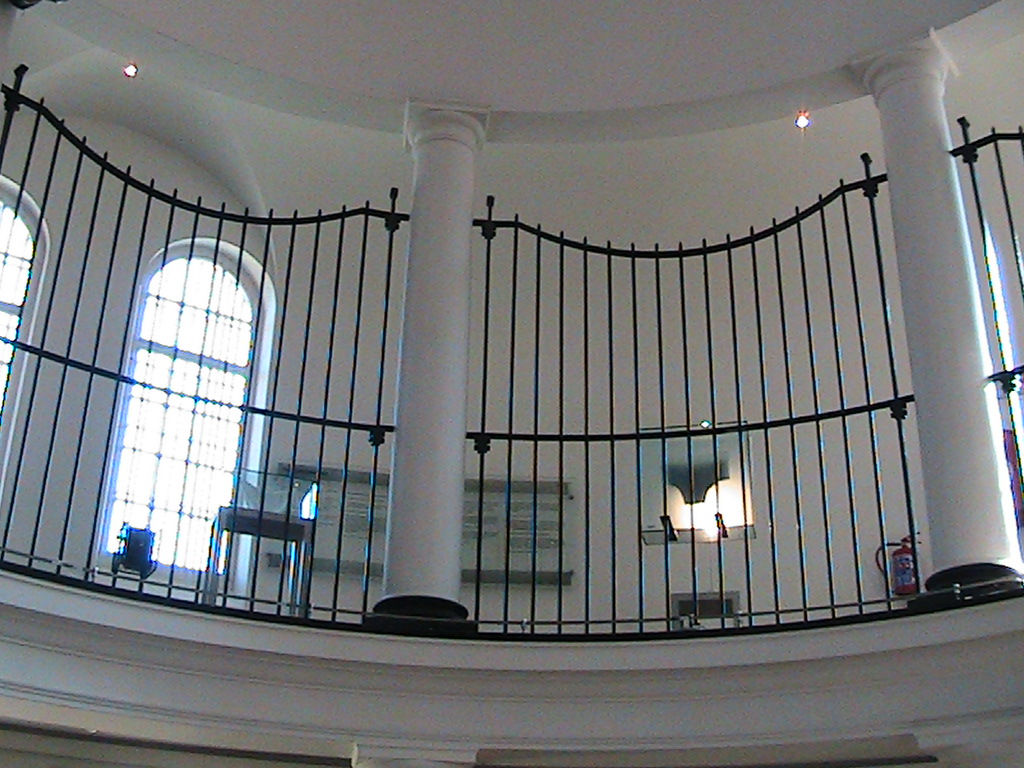
The upper walkway of the Women's Gaol. Now an exhibition area.

=== Museum ===
The museum section records the histories of prisoners who were held there, and includes the Mandela Cell, where Nelson Mandela was housed when he was held in prison during the 1956 Treason Trial.

== See also ==
- List of Castles and Fortifications in South Africa
