= John Gaspard Gubbins =

John Gaspard Gubbins (6 January 1877 Upham, Hampshire - 12 November 1935 Johannesburg) was an Africana collector and writer. He was the son of a rector Richard Shard Gubbins (1 December 1826 St. Marylebone, London - 23 October 1884 Herne Hill, London) and Ellen Rolls (30 August 1845 Monmouthshire, Wales 1902 Kensington, London) who were married on 21 November 1865.

Gubbins was educated at Haileybury and Clare College at Cambridge. He came to Transvaal Colony in 1902 and started farming near Ottoshoop on a farm he called Malemani aka Malmani after the original seTswana name of the area, "Molemane", which means "place of much water". Fluorspar was discovered on his farm.

Gubbins spent his life assembling Africana in the form of old books, pictures and manuscripts. A disastrous fire on Christmas Eve 1931 at the Witwatersrand University destroyed 35,000 books, and half of Gubbins' Africana collection. Fearing for the safety of his collection on the farm due to grassfires, Gubbins had started with its relocating to Johannesburg. Undeterred, Gubbins and his patrons immediately started on a new collection which eventually became the Gubbins Library and the nucleus of Johannesburg's Africana Museum. He was director of this Museum until his death. The University conferred an honorary D.Litt. on him.

When John Gaspard Gubbins disembarked from the Kildonan Castle in 1902, he was a young man who believed in the rhetoric laid out for him in church and school in England. Fifteen years later, aboard another ship, mimicking the path of the one that had first transported him from metropole to colony, years of questioning culminated in an intellectual breakdown. Having lived and toiled in South Africa for fifteen years, at the end of a brief respite in England, Gubbins could no longer ignore the great and decidedly modern colonial lie that he had long suspected of being false: that good and evil, heathen and saved, evolved and evolving are mere products of a system of thought that demands binary opposites. They are not real. It was no coincidence that Gubbins arrived at this conclusion. Educated in the church and libraries of late-Victorian England at the height of empire, he was a man who went to Africa filled with certainty about what he would find there. But as a remarkably sensitive man who was always eager to grow, Gubbins was receptive to what life had to teach him. As his thirst for novelty brought him to diverse experiences, the surety of his homegrown convictions weakened. Through historical forays, collecting, farming, and mining, as well as witnessing the multiple effects of World War I in Europe and Africa, Gubbins was no longer able to rely upon the intellectual framework he had once held so dear.

— Sara Byala

== Works ==
- Raven's fire: a novel by John Gaspard Gubbins (2013)
- Profound river - John Gaspard Gubbins (2011)
- Three-dimensional thinking - John Gaspard Gubbins (1924)
