= Rooftop Garden Project =

Experimental urban gardening project in Montreal, Canada

The Rooftop Garden Project is an experimental urban gardening project in Montreal, Canada.

== History ==
The concept of soil-less method planting was introduced by the Montreal-based group Alternatives in 2001. Peggy Bradley, an American researcher, was developing soil-less techniques aimed at offering low-cost, ecologically sustainable, and low-tech gardening solutions for poor, rural communities in regions such as Brazil. Observing the efforts of the Institute for Simplified Hydroponics in Tehuacán, Mexico, Alternatives representatives also took interest in similar initiatives in Morocco and India.

In 2001, the Institute for Simplified Hydroponics extended its initiatives to Montreal. Jane Rabinowicz of Santropol Roulant and Ishmael Hautecoeur of Alternatives collaborated to create what became known as the Rooftop Garden Project. A demonstration garden of 500m² was established on a rooftop near Burnside Hall on the McGill University campus. By 2006, Santropol Roulant was able to produce one-third (or one ton) of the food used in its program through this garden.

The Rooftop Garden Project aims to promote local food production within the Montreal area. It has established community gardens in various locations, including social housing complexes, schools, seniors' residences, and urban spaces such as rooftops, balconies, and stairwells. The Project also undertakes educational initiatives to raise awareness about the sustainability and affordability of autonomous food production. These programs are offered in schools and universities, encouraging local communities and organizations to engage in food growing practices.

Soil-less Cultivation Process

The soil-less cultivation process used by the Rooftop Garden Project involves self-watering containers that are portable and adaptable to various environments. These containers are typically made from recycled materials and are designed to be simple to construct. In 2002, Alternatives converted a 50-gallon olive barrel into a rooftop planting container. Other items, such as tires and storage bins, can also be repurposed for this use. The containers are lined with materials like sawdust or vermiculite to help absorb nutrients and moisture. Organic compost, including vegetable scraps and coffee grounds, provides nutrients to the plants. The containers are watered by rain or simple irrigation systems, keeping the roots moist while allowing for periodic airing to prevent crop damage. Produce like cucumbers, tomatoes, basil, lettuce, and other crops that require minimal space thrive in these environments.

Garden Organization

The initial demonstration garden was managed by volunteers and staff. Over time, the initiative has led to the creation of autonomous gardens operated by enterprises and local communities, with both personal and collective gardens. In Montreal, soil-less garden containers are commonly seen in various urban spaces.

The Project’s first hydroponic system was eventually revised and replaced with a semi-hydroponic system. This new approach eliminated the chemical components of the original system in favor of a self-watering design that uses compost for nutrients and soil for irrigation. This system is considered to be more sustainable, cost-effective, and organic.

Volunteering and Funding

Initially, volunteers for the Rooftop Garden Project were primarily young adults and students, leading to high turnover rates. Over time, the volunteer base became more stable, which strengthened relationships with external partners. Several Montreal universities, including Concordia University, have contributed to the project, with Concordia running a project in its greenhouse.

The majority of the Rooftop Garden Project's funding is provided by Alternatives, with additional support from institutions such as McGill University, UQAM, TelUQ, and Engineers Without Borders. While Santropol Roulant, a volunteer and donation-run organization, does not have the resources to fund and expand the Project, the Rooftop Garden Project also relies on donations and community fundraising efforts. Local organizations, such as Action Comuniterre’s collective garden in the NDG borough of Montreal, have also supported the Project through activities like selling organic heritage seeds and plants.

== Sources ==
Beaudin, Monique. “Urban gardening is looking up; Rooftop plots are just one way to 'green' city spaces.” The Montreal Gazette, February 9, 2009. Accessed on April 19, 2010.

Canadian Partnerships; Special Initiatives Programme. Urban Agriculture Reaches New Heights through Rooftop Gardening. Accessed on March 3, 2010.

Granger, Lia. “Urban Gardening: the greenhouse effect.” The Montreal Gazette, April 9. 2010. Accessed on April 19, 2010.

International Partnership in Community Economic Development: The Rooftop Garden Project. Accessed on March 3, 2010.

The Rooftop Gardens Project. Accessed on March 3, 2010.
