= Newtown, Johannesburg =

Newtown
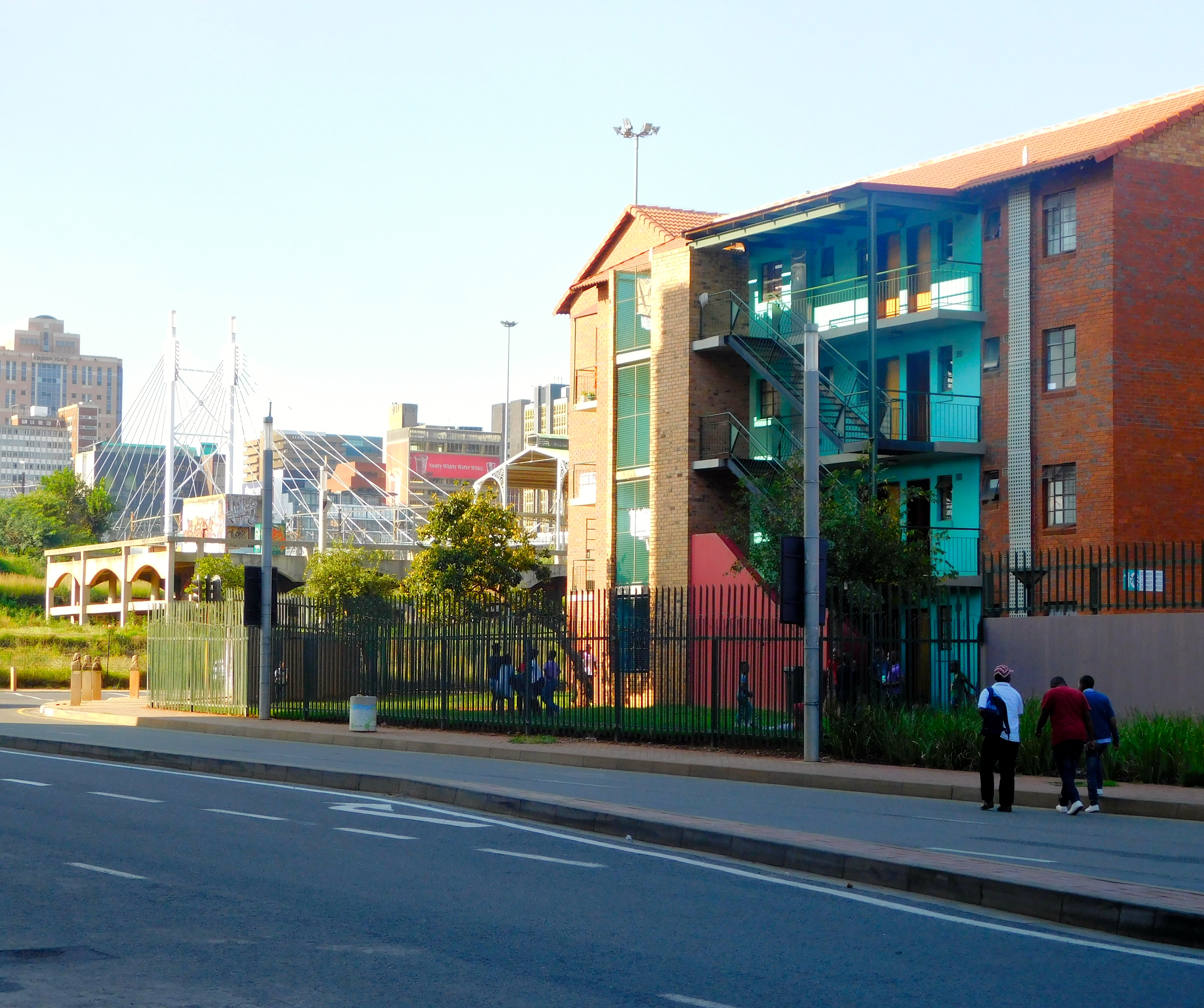
- Newtown, with Nelson Mandela Bridge in the background
- Interactive map of Newtown
- Coordinates: 26.204°S 28.034°E
- Country: South Africa
- Province: Gauteng
- Municipality: City of Johannesburg
- Main Place: Johannesburg

Government
  - Councillor: Nokuthula Albertina Xaba (African National Congress)

Area
  - Total: 0.85 km^{2} (0.33 sq mi)

Population (2011)
  - Total: 2,505
  - Density: 2,900/km^{2} (7,600/sq mi)

Racial makeup (2011)
  - Black African: 90.0%
  - Coloured: 1.9%
  - Indian/Asian: 6.4%
  - White: 1.2%
  - Other: 0.6%

Language (2011)
  - Zulu: 20.9%
  - English: 12.5%
  - Tswana: 10.0%
  - Northern Sotho: 8.1%
  - Other: 48.6%
- Postal code: 2113
- Website: www.newtown.gov.za

Newtown is a suburb of Johannesburg, South Africa. It is located in the capital city of Gauteng Province and in Region F of the City of Johannesburg Metropolitan Municipality. It has the coordinates of 26.204°S and 28.034°E. The suburb originated as a manufacturing district for brick production.

== Historical background ==
In the early 20th century, the Newtown Precinct was named "the Brickfields". In 1896, approximately 7,000 people lived in the town.

A number of industries developed at Brickfields, such as trade firms, banks, brick factories, a brewery, and fisheries. Immigrants from other nations, also settled in Brieckfields.

In April 1904, Mahatma Gandi declared an outbreak of the bubonic plague in Brickfield. The plague caused 82 fatalities and 112 people were reportedly diagnosed with it. The local government initiated the fire brigade to start fires within the town, aiming to cease the plague.

== Turbine Hall ==
Originally built between 1927 and 1934, the Turbine Hall became the largest "three steam-driven" power stations. It is situated in the middle of Newtown and has been deemed an iconic building in the art and culture precinct.

== Cleanup ==
The Greater Newtown Construction was initiated by City of Johannesburg Municipality Council, which rehabilitated old suburb structures, enhanced public open spaces, and introduced closed-circuit television.

Newtown's street lighting was designed by the French engineer Patrick Rimoux.

== Regeneration ==
Johannesburg City Council partnered with Gauteng Agency, Blue IQ, in a project to develop the community of Newtown. The project included building five housing developments in which Council states, "[it will] cater for different levels of income".

The plan details that over 2,000 housing units will be built within a few years. The Nelson Mandela Bridge, inaugurated on 20 July 2003, is the northern entrance to Newtown.
