= Patrick Rimoux =

Patrick Rimoux (born 17 March 1958 in France), is a light sculptor. He lives in Paris where he runs the Patrick Rimoux Agency.

== Biography ==
Patrick Rimoux is a contemporary artist and engineer, who works primarily with new French technologies. As a light sculptor, Rimoux modulates light and uses it as an artistic medium. Known for his town monuments, he has also exhibited his work at the Galerie Baudoin Lebon in Paris, the Galerie Valérie Bach in Brussels, and the Matthieu Foss Gallery in Bombay.

=== Urban light ===
A graduate of the Ecole Nationale Supérieure with a technological education, Rimoux also trained as an engineer at the Beaux Arts in Paris, where he studied at the studio of Claude Viseux. Meeting with Henri Alekan for the project Paths of Light was an important step in his artistic career because it helped define light as his medium of choice.

Rimoux's projects are primarily urban sized; he works with light at the city level. Rimoux works with well-directed public spaces and architectural ensembles to integrate light into the urban landscape. He uses light reflection to make this integration look organic and natural.

Rimoux has worked on the Grand-Place in Brussels, dresses the front of the French Embassy in New York City, and created the scenography of light around the Centre Pompidou-Metz.

Rimoux collaborated with the composer Louis Dandrel for the Garden of Sound and Light at La Borie, Limoges.

=== Light events ===
Rimoux produces light works for special events. Making himself the third component of staging, he accompanied his light dance performances as Cayenne in Dancing the City. He also illustrated the scene where Phaedra represented India alongside Astrid Bas and George Lavaudant.

Rimoux has participated in several festivals, such as the Eclectic Rocamadour and the Festival of the Word at Charity Sur Loire, where he created a work that showed the figure of Cardinal de Bernis.

=== Light design ===
Rimoux uses his knowledge of new technologies, innovative designs, and new lighting techniques, and theatrical light modulation to create his designs.

One such design was a light piece for the Freedom Towers in Soweto, South Africa. The sculpture, commissioned by Nelson Mandela, consists of five black concrete columns mingled with nine white concrete columns. Dimming carried on these surfaces creates the movement of colors, making a meaningful sculpture. Another of Rimoux's designs was lighting of the Rue de la Loi, where he created customized "poles of light".

=== Contemporary work ===
His personal artistic work focuses on cinematography films that crystallize the question of revealing light. In France, he worked with the raw 35mm film material of Wim Wenders, Michael Haneke, and Akira Kurosawa. In 2010, exposure in the Baudoin Lebon gallery led him to work with the actress Sandrine Bonnaire.

While in India, staying at the guest house at the French Alliance and the Embassy of France in Delhi, Rimoux discovered the riches of Bollywood cinema, especially in regards to light and how it affixes to film, opening spaces that appear to be colored distillation of the atmosphere of the country. Rimoux was so taken with Bollywood that in 2011 and 2012 he exhibited several works at the exhibition of the India Art Fair in Delhi.

== Main achievements ==
=== Permanent creations ===
- Lighting for the Ministry of Defence, Architecture by Nicolas Michelin, Balard, Paris, 2011
- Permanent work for the cloister of the Benedictines of the city of Words, La Charité-sur-Loire, France, 2011, 70 m long video projection
- Light scenography around the Centre Pompidou-Metz, France, 2010
- Light scenography of the Cher Bridge for the new tramway, Tours, France, 2010
- Lighting of Europe's Ring, Brussels, 2010
- Survey for the Grand-Place, Brussels, 2010
- Lighting of the Euro Mediterranean Research Center & Ingémédia Institute. Architecture by Nicolas Michelin, Toulon, France, 2010
- Light scenography for the glass partition of ARTEM. Architecture by Nicolas Michelin, Nancy, France, 2009
- Survey for Brussels North, Brussels, 2009
- Wharf & Place du Débarcadère, Saint Paul, La Réunion, France, 2009
- Centre of the Francophony of America, 400 years of Québec, Québec, Canada, 2008
- City Hall of Québec, 400 years of Québec, Québec, 2008
- Brabant Bridge, Saint Josse, Belgium, 2007
- Garden of the Lighting Sounds project, Cultural Centre, La Borie, France, 2007
- Cayenne lightpole, Cayenne, French Guiana, 2005
- Light survey for Cayenne, French Guiana, 2005
- Freedom Towers, Soweto, South Africa, 2005
- Sculpture for the commemoration of the Heysel tragedy, Brussels, 2005
- Place de l'Albertine, Brussels, 2004
- Nelson Mandela Bridge, Johannesburg, South Africa, 2003
- Brussels lightpole, Rue de la Loi, Belgium, 2003
- Argenton sur Creuse, France, 2003
- Royal saltworks, survey, Arc et Senans, France, 2001
- Boulevard Beaurivage, La Ciotat, France, 1999
- Viaduct, Nevers, France, 1999
- The cliff and fortress of Mornas, France, 1999
- Boulevard du centenaire, Brussels, 1999
- Brussels Exhibition Centre, Belgium, 1999
- Summer Solstice, Ixelles, Belgium, 1998
- Light paths on Maurice Utrillo Street. Montmartre, Paris, 1997
- Light paths on Chevalier de la Barre Street, Montmartre, Paris, 1997
- 100 Years, 100 Directors, 100 Films, Brussels, 1996
- Light path, Aignay le Duc, France, 1992
- Funeral monument for Henri Langlois, Montparnasse, Paris, 1990

=== Temporary creations and events ===
- Rangoli of Light, New Delhi, 2011
- The Hundred Words of the Bernis Cardinal, Festival du Mot, La Charité-sur-Loire, France, 2011
- Centenary of the Museum of Art and History of Geneva, Switzerland, 2010
- 150th anniversary of the French consulate in Québec, Canada, 2010
- Phèdre de Sénèque, Scenography from Astrid Bas, Le Centquatre, Paris, France, 2010
- Criée, son crépuscule, Autumn Festival in Normandy, Dieppe, France, 2009
- Song of Songs, MoMA PS1, New York City, 2009
- Payne Whitney Mansion, French American Cultural Exchange, 972 Fifth Avenue, New York City, 2009
- Light scenography for Va vis, Norma Claire's choreography, Ivry, France, 2007
- Dance the City, City Hall, Cayenne, French Guiana, 2007
- Church Sainte Croix, Liège adorned with colors, Liège, Belgium, 2007
- Palais des Princes Evèques, Liège adorned with colors, Liège, Belgium, 2007
- Secret trail, Courtyard of the Palais des Princes Evêques, Liège, Belgium, 2006
- Liège adorned with colours, Liège, Belgium, 2005
- Dance the City, Cayenne, French Guiana, 2005
- D'Amarante à Zinzolin, Sauroy Mansion, Paris, 2005
- Dance the City, Cayenne, French Guiana, 2004
- The Imaginary Gardens, Terrasson Lavilledieu, France, 2004
- The Lighted Eclectics, 2,500 Souls, Rocamadour, France, 2004
- Dance the City, Cayenne, French Guiana, 2003
- Winter Delights, Grand-Place, Brussels, 2003
- Winter Delights, The Forest, Grand-Place, Brussels, 2002
- Winter Delights, The Meadow, Grand-Place, Brussels, 2001
- Le Plateau, Inauguration of the center for contemporary art F.R.A.C., Paris, 2002
- Twice yearly festival of contemporary art, Nîmes, France, 2002
- Love is sweet, Norma Claire's choreography, Beauvais, France. 2001
- Installation in the undergrounds of Provins, France, 1995

=== Installations and exhibitions ===
- Exhibition at the Matthieu Foss Gallery, Mumbai, India, 2011
- Map of the Light, scenography around the Centre Pompidou-Metz
- Cyclopes, lightpoles, Baudoin Lebon Gallery, Paris, 2010
- Elle's Appelle Sabine, from Sandrine Bonnaire, 35mm film, plexiglass, resin, Baudoin Lebon Gallery, Paris, 2010
- Fantasy in Colors, Rythmetic from Norman McLaren, 35mm film, plexiglass, resin, Baudoin Lebon Gallery, Paris, 2010
- Films 35 mm, resin, optical lens, Galerie Le Café Français, Brussels, 2009
- Brussels New York, Photography exhibition, Galerie Le Café Français, Brussels, 2009
- Brussels Sheep, Immersed ticket office, Congrès Train Station, Brusells, 2009
- Installation with 35 mm films, Photography exhibition about the Grand-Place, Congrès Train Station, Brussels, 2009
- Pheadra in India, Film sculpture for a theater play by Astrid Bas and Georges Lavaudant, Delhi and Bombay, India, 2008
- Piccolo Teatro: Archi 4, Plexiglass and LED spotlights, France, 2007, 1.40 x 1.80 m
- Installation VUIT ND 2835N7712E P4848N220E TON, Louis Vuitton's exhibition room, Champs Elysées, Paris, 2006
- Cage, 35 mm films, resin, Louis Vuitton space, Champs Elysées, Paris, 2006
- exhibition «L Inde dans tous les sens». Louis Vuitton Space, Champs Elysées, Paris. 2006
- Exhibition at the French Alliance of New Delhi, India, 2006
- Installation with the 35 mm film of Le Cirque de Calder, Baudoin Lebon Gallery, Paris, 2005
- L'homme Qui Rétrécit and Installation with the 35 mm film La Chambre Obscure, Baudoin Lebon Gallery, Paris, 2005
- Reactograms for the EDF foundation, Paris, 2004
- Funny Games, L'homme Qui Plantait des Arbres, Maadadayo, Bar le Duc, France, 2003
- Installation with the 35 mm film Mortel Transfert by JJ Beineix, Bar le duc, France, 2003
- Passage, Grand Palais, 400 x 200 x 300 cm, and Installation, Beaux Arts, 1300 x 70 x 70 cm, Paris, 1990
- Odysée, sculpture for the Gan movie, Tunisie, 1989, 7 x 12 × 6 m
