= Khanya College =

South African non-governmental organisation

Khanya College is an independent non-governmental organisation based in Johannesburg, South Africa. Established in 1986, the primary aim of Khanya College is to assist various constituencies within working class and poor communities to respond to the challenges posed by the forces of economic and political globalisation. The motto of the organization is "Education for Liberation".

The Khanya College offices are located at 123 Prichard Street, downtown Johannesburg.
