= Braamfontein =

- Location within Gauteng Location within South Africa Location within Africa
- Coordinates: 26°11′28″S 28°02′16″E
- Country: South Africa
- Province: Gauteng
- Municipality: City of Johannesburg
- Main Place: Johannesburg

Area
  - Total: 3.28 km^{2} (1.27 sq mi)

Population (2001)
  - Total: 7,007
  - Density: 2,140/km^{2} (5,530/sq mi)
- Time zone: UTC+2 (SAST)
- Postal code (street): 2001
- PO box: 2017
- Area code: 010

Braamfontein (English: blackberry spring, or more prosaicly blackberry springs; also known as Braam) is a central suburb of Johannesburg, in South Africa, seat of the Constitutional Court of South Africa and some of South Africa's major corporations. Situated due north of the city centre, Braamfontein is the fourth-largest office node in the city of Johannesburg containing many multi-storied buildings representing various architectural styles including Art Deco and Brutalist. Numerous office buildings have been and are in the process of being converted to residential apartments. The offices of the Johannesburg City Council and the University of the Witwatersrand are situated in Braamfontein. The Nelson Mandela Bridge is a landmark that connects Braamfontein to the city centre, traversing South Africa's most extensive passenger train marshalling yard. Jan Smuts Avenue and Empire Road are two major road thoroughfares that run through the suburb.

== History ==
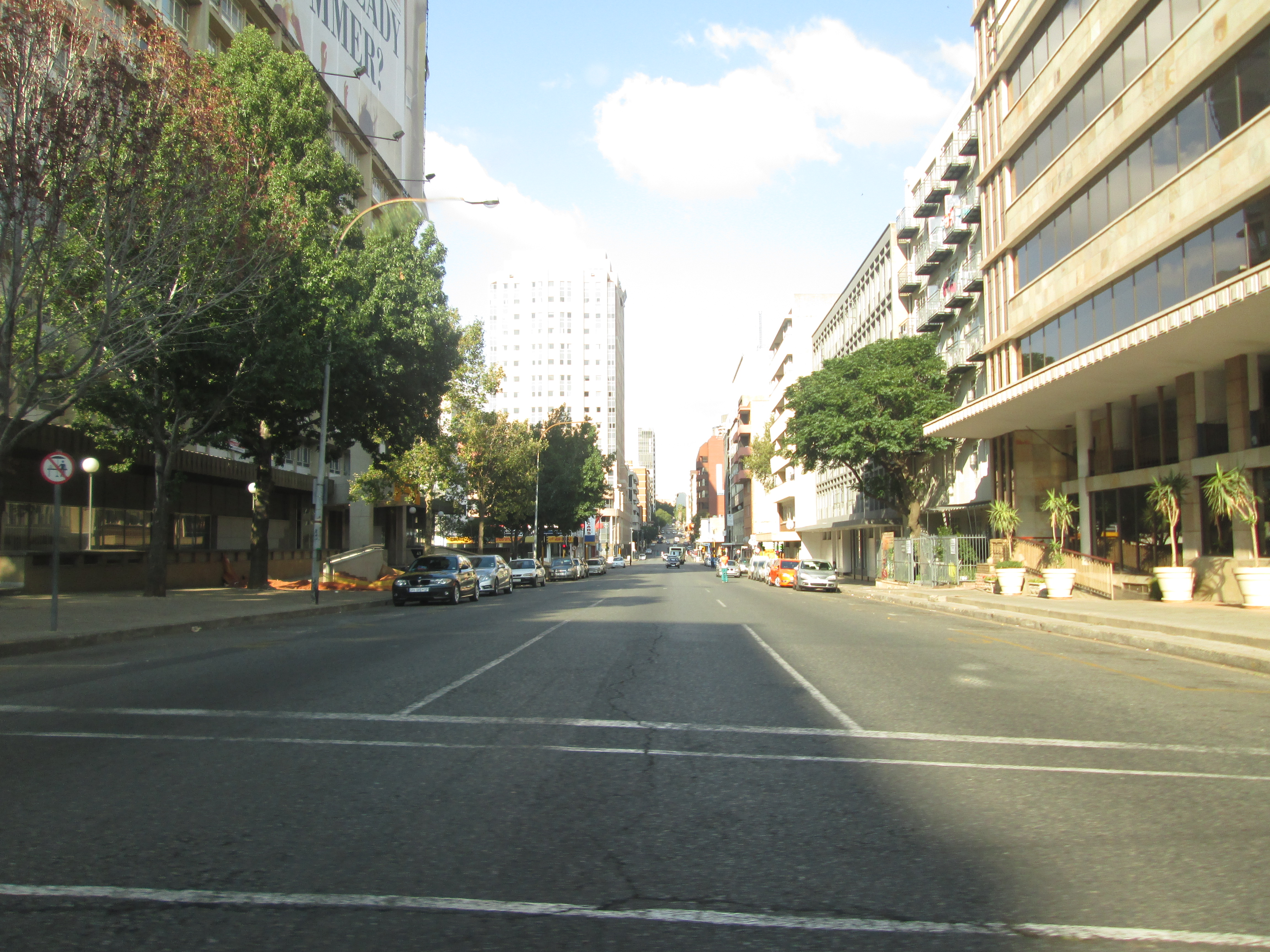
De Korte Street

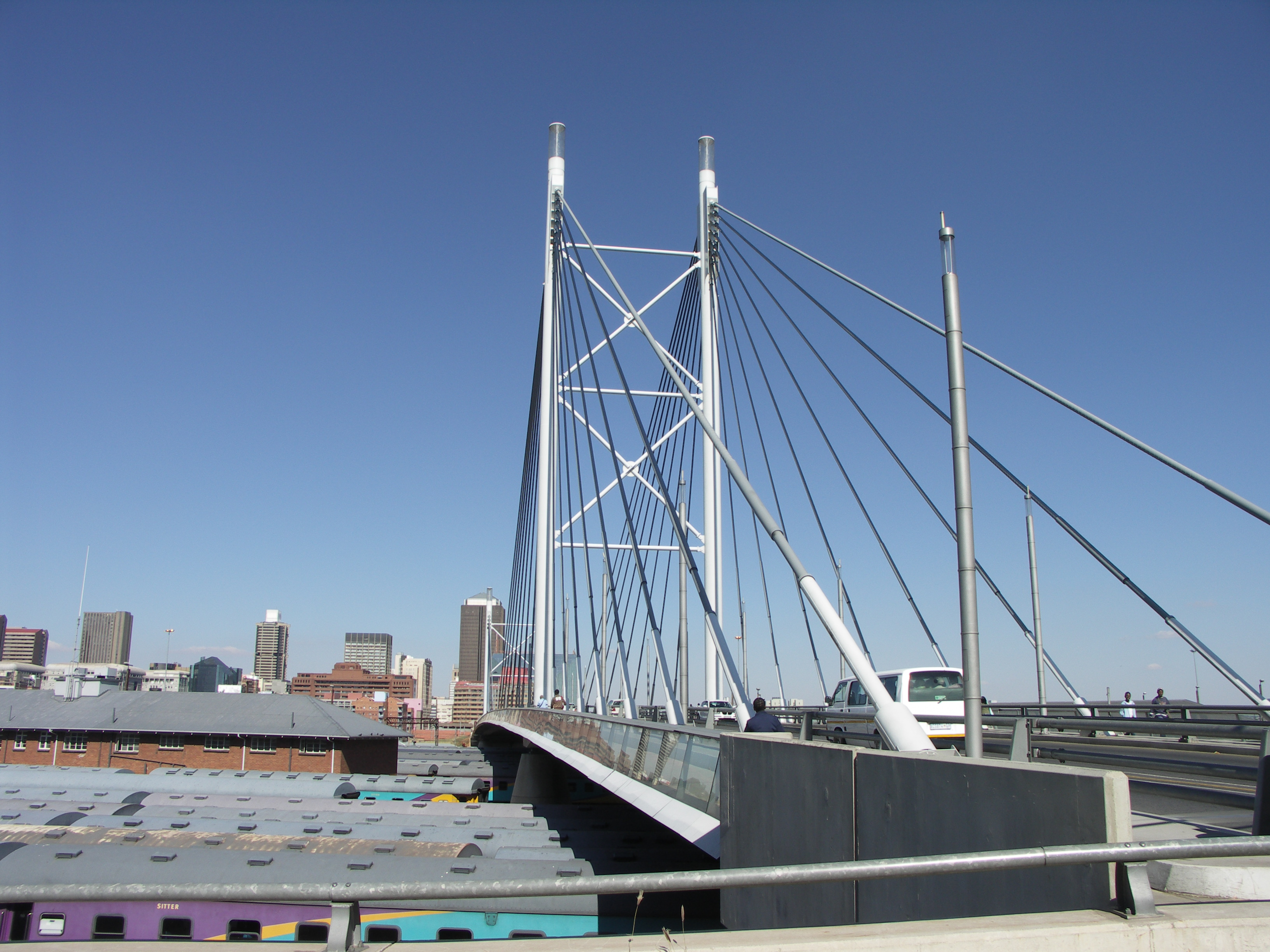
The Nelson Mandela Bridge

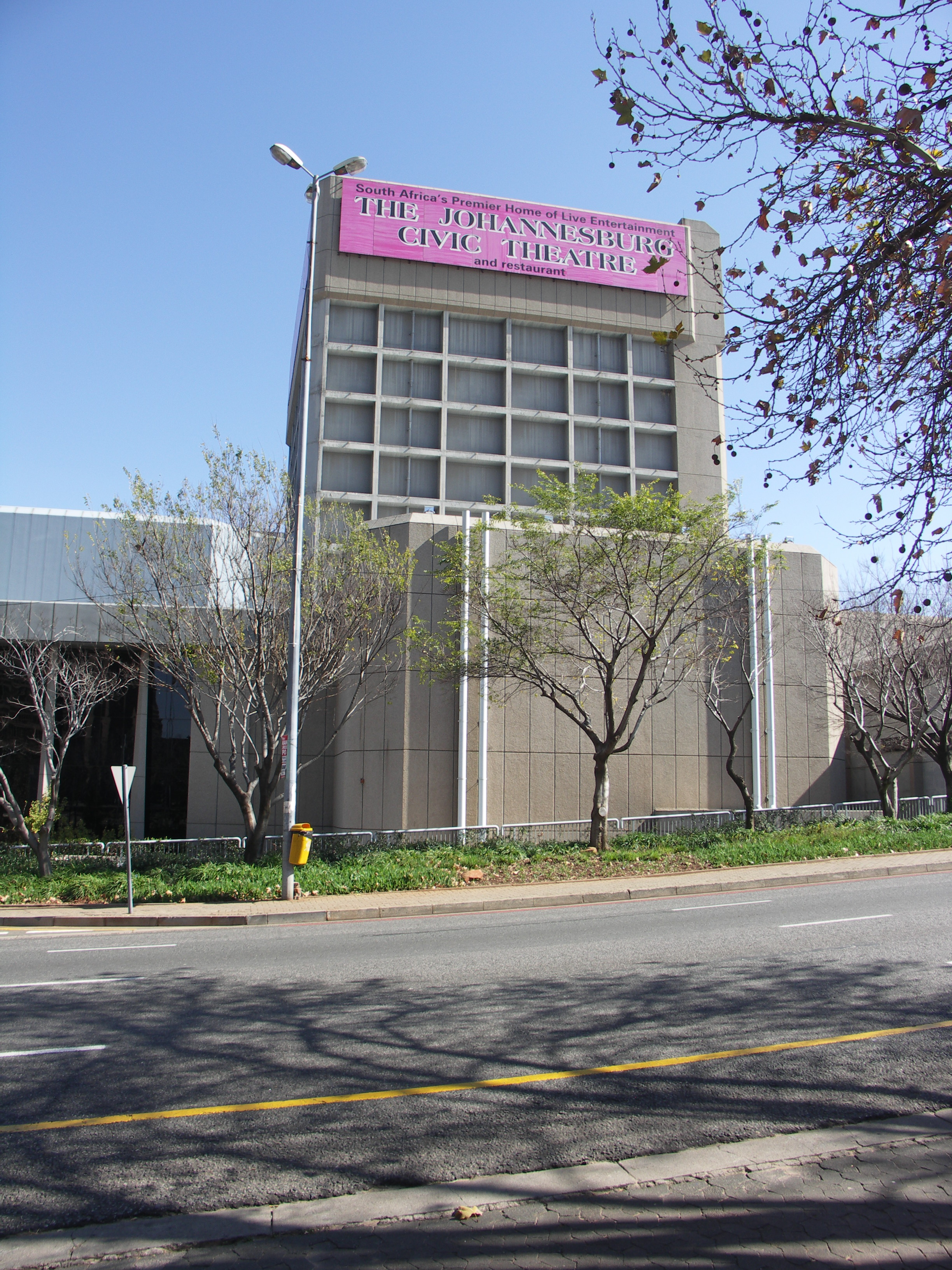
The Joburg Theatre

The name "Braamfontein" dates from as early as 1853, when a farm with this name to the north-west of Randjeslaagte belonged to Gert Bezuidenhout. In that year he applied to the government of the Transvaal to have his farm surveyed. In 1858, Gert sold his farm to F.J. Bezuidenhout.

Like many farms on the Witwatersrand, Braamfontein was subdivided early on, indicating a fairly dense population in the area. Two other Bezuidenhouts, Gerhardus Petrus and Cornelis Willem, each purchased one third of the farm in 1862, and a third part went to Frans Johannes van Dijk. Between 1862 and 1886 different portions were further subdivided.

Three other well-known owners were Johannes Jacobus Lindeque, who in 1884, bought a section where the Country Club was later established in 1906, and Frans Eduard and Louwrens Geldenhuys.

The first suburb established on the farm Braamfontein in 1888-1889 was unofficially named after the farm, as an official extension of the city of Johannesburg. This area is still called Braamfontein. There was, however, an earlier but unsuccessful effort to create a suburb prior to this.

On February 19, 1896, a freight train containing 56 tonnes of dynamite exploded in Braamfontein, killing 78 people.

The Railway Safety Regulator once had its head office in Braamfontein.

During the apartheid era, large-scale commercial development in the area was encouraged. Until the middle of the 1980s an electric trolley-bus line traversed some of the area's roads. After the abolition of apartheid, the area began to deteriorate. However, intervention by both the city of Johannesburg and large corporate business, acting as the "Braamfontein Management District", initiated a process of urban renewal in this district.

== Braamfontein today ==
Several companies, such as Liberty Holdings Limited, JD Group (part of Steinhoff Africa), Sappi, and Bidvest (formerly Rennies) Bank and Hollard, are based in Braamfontein. Urban renewal efforts and the establishment of the Braamfontein Management District by the Johannesburg Development Agency and property owners have prevented the district from decaying to the same extent as the Johannesburg CBD; however, considerable work remains to be done in order to restore the area's economic infrastructure to developed-country standards, eliminate dangerous and unsanitary buildings owned by the private sector, eliminate violent crime, reduce petty crime to tolerable levels, and prevent infringements of road traffic laws.

The four theatres comprising the Joburg Theatre Complex and Constitution Hill, incorporating the Constitutional Court of South Africa, the Old Fort Prison and museums preserving the history of penal custody in South Africa, forming a listed World Heritage Site, are located in Braamfontein.
