= Kloof (disambiguation) =

Kloof is a town near Durban, in KwaZulu-Natal, South Africa.

Kloof may also refer to:

- Kloof Street, a major road and leisure destination in Cape Town's City Bowl region
- Kloof High School, a high school in Kloof, South Africa
- Kloof Nek Road, a road running through the mountains, from Gardens to Camps Bay, in Cape Town
- Kloof Street Public Library, a public library in Kloof Street in Cape Town, South Africa
- Kloofendal Nature Reserve, a nature reserve near Roodepoort, South Africa
- Kloofsig, a suburb of Centurion in Gauteng Province, South Africa
