= Fish Hoek Library =

Public library in Fish Hoek in Cape Town, South Africa

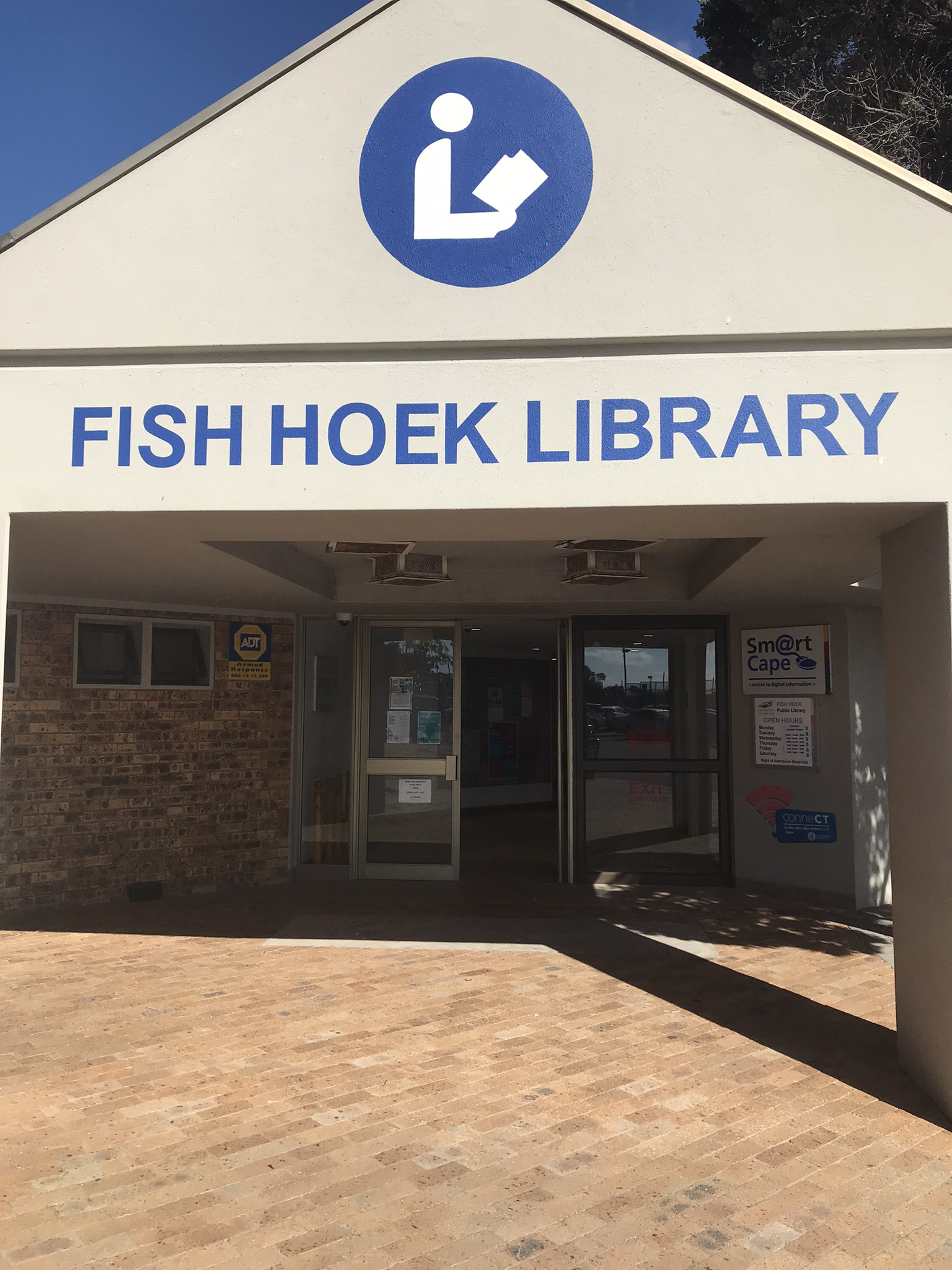
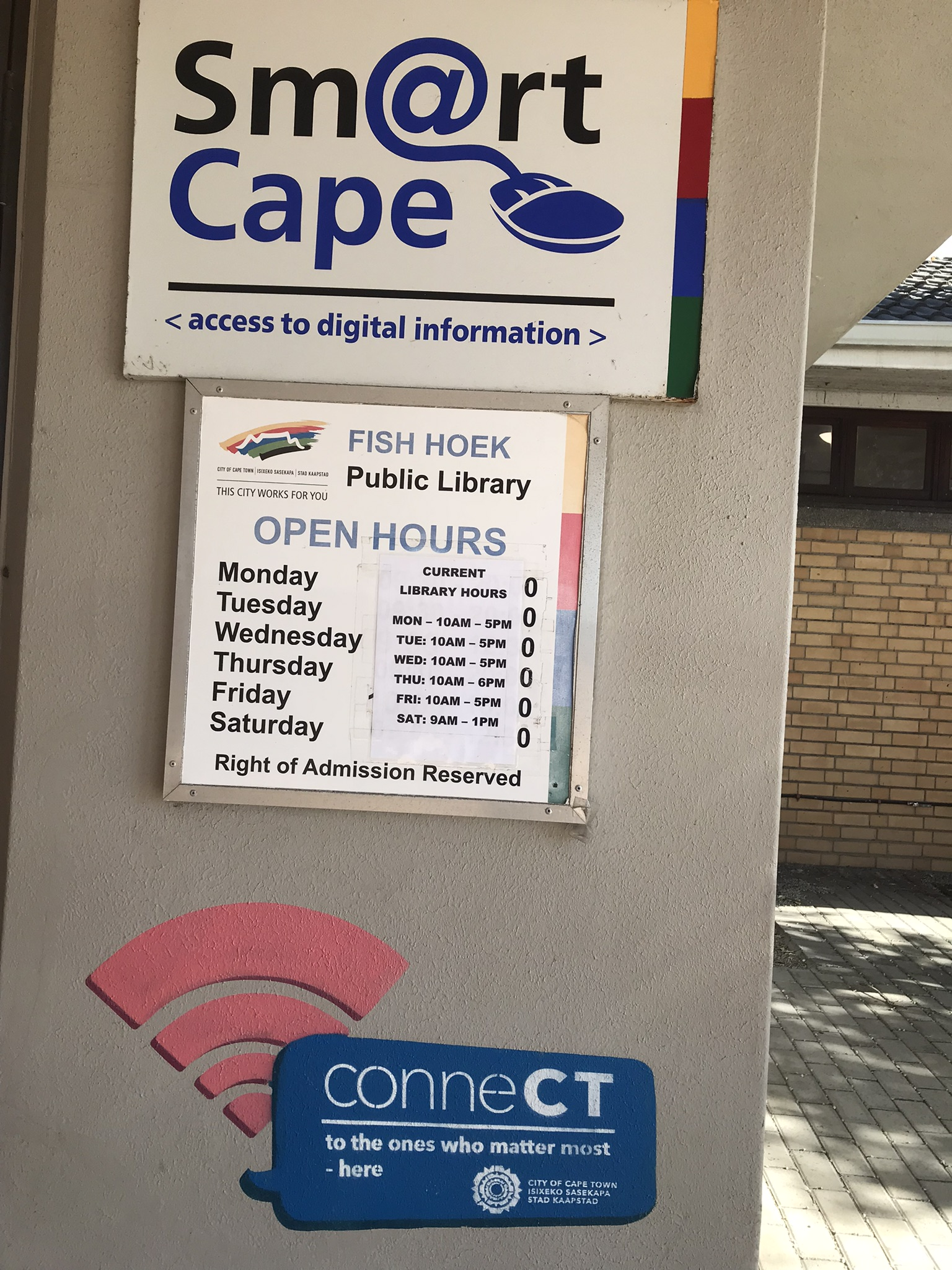
- 34.13606679364871°S 18.426529805662152°E
- Location: Civic Centre, Central Circle, Fish Hoek, Cape Town, South Africa
- Type: Public library
- Established: 1 April 1954
- Branch of: City of Cape Town Library and Information Services

Collection
- Size: 92,414 (June 2014)

Access and use
- Circulation: 423,517 (2016)
- Population served: 11,890 (2011)
- Members: 8195

Other information
- Employees: 14 employees
- Website: Fish Hoek Library

Fish Hoek Library is a public library in the seaside suburb of Fish Hoek in Cape Town, South Africa. In 2025 it had the seventh highest circulation of all public libraries in the Western Cape.

== History ==
The library opened on 1 April 1954 in an old municipal building and was run for the next 36 years by Ethel May Gillard. The library opened its current location in 1988

== Services ==
The library provides access to two online encyclopedias. The library's holdings can be searched online via the City of Cape Town's Online Public Access Catalogue (OPAC).

On Friday mornings, the library operates a Story Hour for small children.

As part of the Smartcape initiative, the library also offers free access to 10 computers, which can be used to edit documents, create presentations and access the internet. Also a part of community outreach programs is a book service to local old-age homes, as well as specialised services to local home schoolers.

The library hosts a monthly literary tea talk, featuring local authors, who visit to discuss their books and conducts a regular book sale. Originally begun as a fundraising event, the annual "Library Alive" promotional fundraiser is now a regular annual event.

On the last Wednesday of every month, the Library in conjunction with the Fish Hoek Valley Museum hosts History over Tea, where residents are invited to come in to share memories and build a living record of Fish Hoek's history.

On the second and last Saturdays of the month, the library hosts a craft market.

The library in the Masiphumelele township was managed by the Fish Hoek library from 2003 until 2010, when it was reclassified as a separate branch.

== Events ==
In 2015, the library implemented the annual "Blown Away By Books" festival. Although originally presented by Fish Hoek Library, the festival has now grown to include nearby libraries in Masiphumelele, Ocean View, Kommetjie and Simon's Town.

On the 23rd & 24th October 2026 Fish Hoek Library celebrated the inaugural Fish Hoek Library Literary Festival with the theme Every Language Holds a Story.

== Library Hours ==
Day	Opening Hours
Monday	09:30 - 17:00
Tuesday	09:30 - 17:00
Wednesday	09:30 - 17:00
Thursday	09:30 - 18:00
Friday	09:30 - 17:00
Saturday	09:00 - 13:00
Sunday	CLOSED

== See also ==
- Rondebosch Library
- University of Cape Town Libraries
