= Meadowridge Library =

Public library in the suburb of Meadowridge, in Cape Town, South Africa

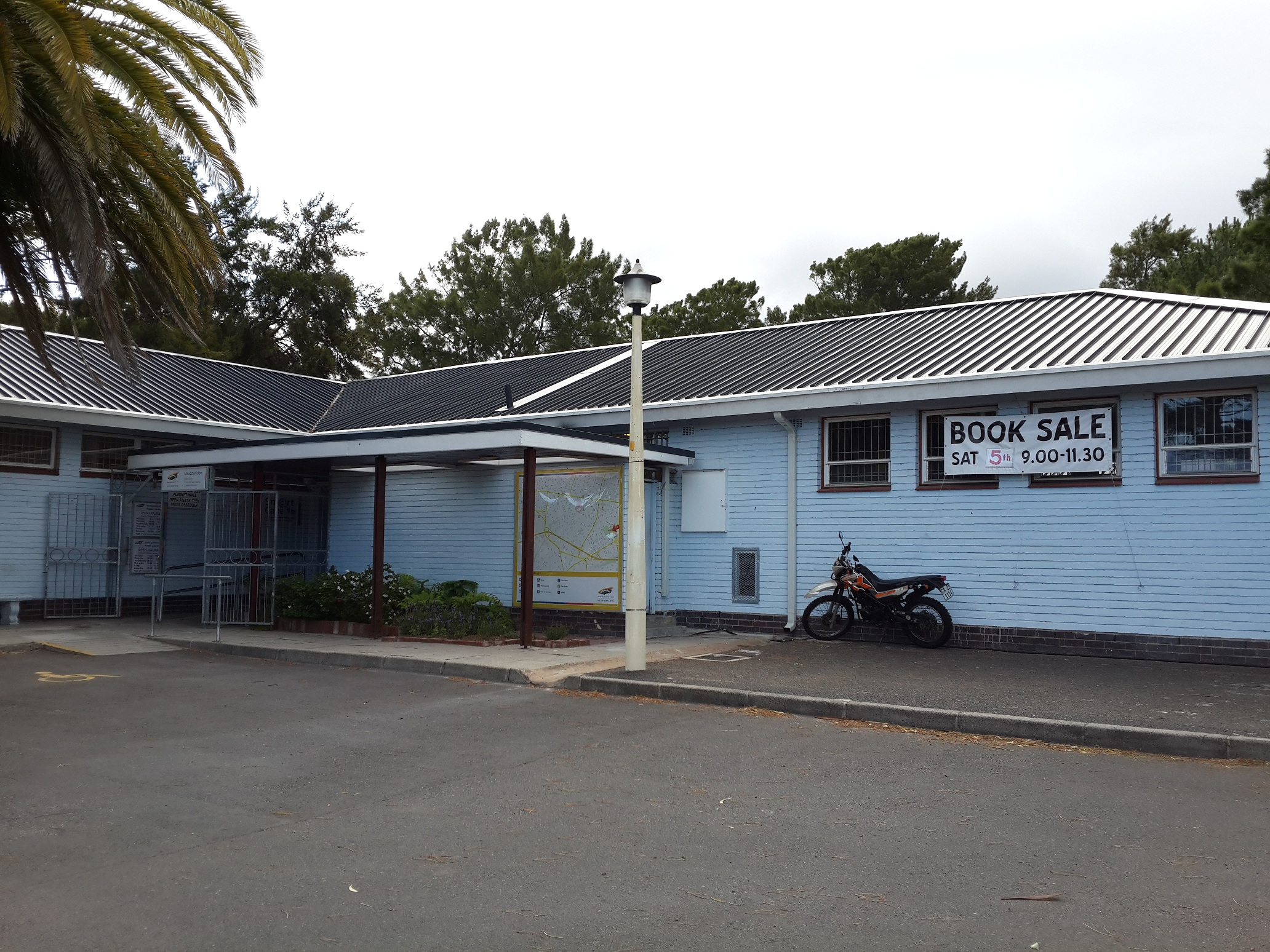
- Meadowridge Library in Cape Town, South Africa
- 34.039153°S 18.454085°E
- Location: 30 Howard Drive, Meadowridge, Cape Town, South Africa
- Type: Public library
- Branch of: City of Cape Town Library and Information Services

Collection
- Items collected: 21,436 (2025)

Access and use
- Access requirements: Library membership (free); Library card carries a R20 replacement fee
- Circulation: 163,185 (2025)
- Members: 4,121 (2025)

Other information
- Website: CCT Libraries and Services (select Meadowridge)

Location of Meadowridge Library within Cape Town.

Meadowridge Library is a public library in the suburb of Meadowridge, in the city of Cape Town, South Africa. In 2025, it had the 6th highest circulation of all libraries in the Western Cape.

Established in January 1960, the library holds over 21,000 items, and is open 45 hours a week. It offers books, DVDs, CDs, audiobooks, and magazines for loan, and these can be searched for online, via the City of Cape Town's Open Public Access Catalogue (OPAC).

The library is in close proximity to a number of schools, including Bergvliet Primary School, Bergvliet High School, Westcott Primary School, Sweet Valley Primary School, and the American International School of Cape Town. The library serves a large community, with many neighboring suburbs not having libraries of their own.

== Facilities ==
Meadowridge Library has its own parking area and a dedicated children's library, positioned separately to the main library area.

The library has three computers available for public use. Members of the public can become library members, and then register, using their library card, to use the computers via Cape Town's Smart Cape initiative.

== Community programs ==
Meadowridge Library's hosts weekly storytelling sessions every Wednesday in its children's section, attended by children from a neighboring preschool, as well as others from surrounding areas. Local authors occasionally attend the sessions and read their books.

The library also hosts regular book sales, class visits, educational holiday programs, library orientation sessions for local school children, flea markets, computer classes and reading programs.

Meadowridge Library staff regularly take part in outreach programs. One of the staff assists with Help-to-Read tuition at a local school on a weekly basis. The library hosts an annual Reading Competition in April, sponsored by the local ward councillor, in which grade seven students from four disadvantaged schools participate. One of the library's volunteers runs a free Xhosa class every Tuesday evening. During the last quarter of the school year, the library is involved in Capricorn Park Primary School's Career Day.

During the Library and Information Association of South Africa's South African Library Week, which takes place each year during the week of the 20th of March, Meadowridge Library joins with other Cape Town libraries to promote the library service at a Meadowridge shopping center.

In October 2015, Meadowridge Library partnered with the South African Association of Women Graduates and the Project for the Study of Alternative Education in South Africa to run an educational program at the library for 35 girls from Khayelitsha and Kraaifontein.

== Gallery ==
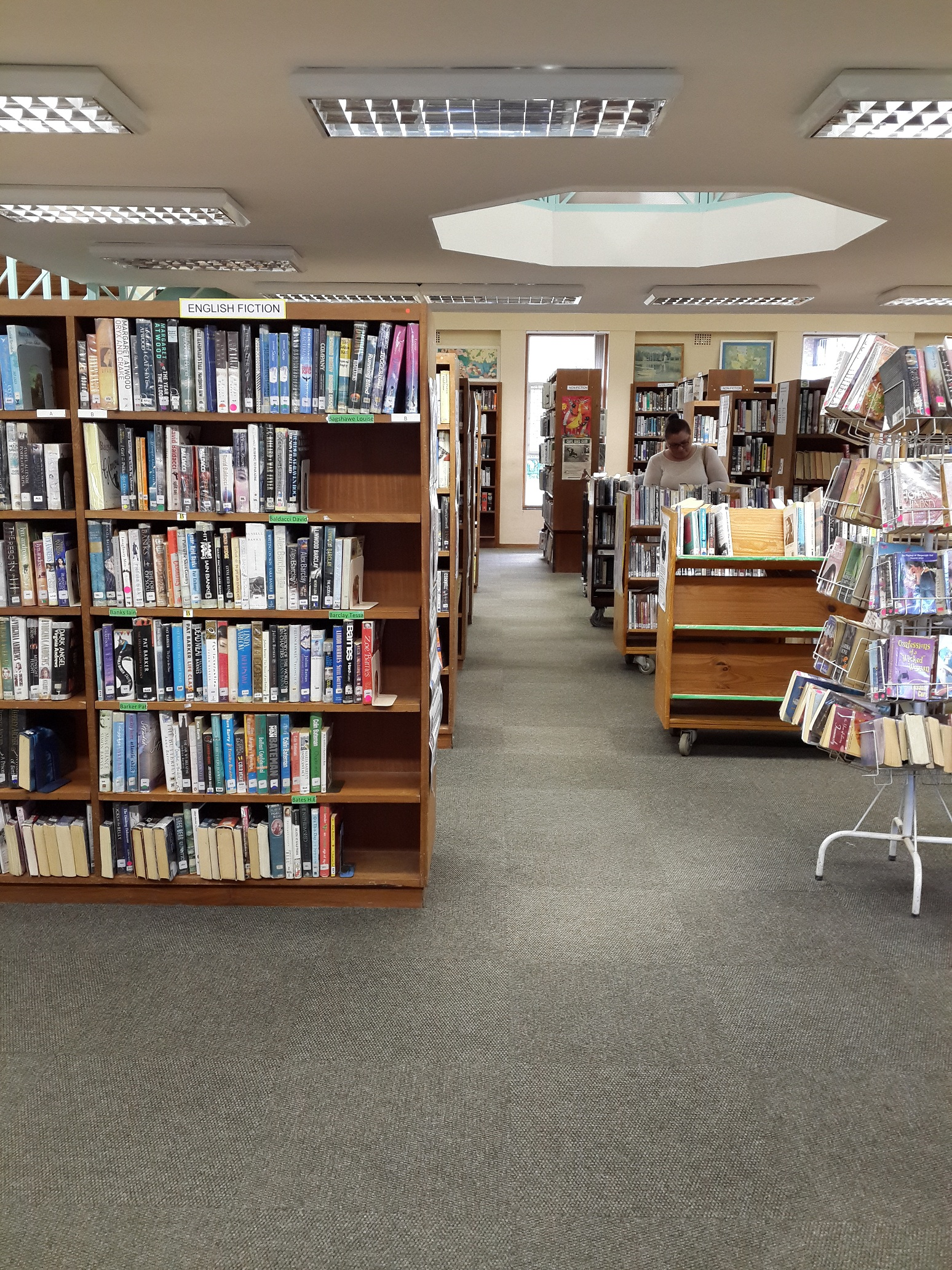
Main section of the library

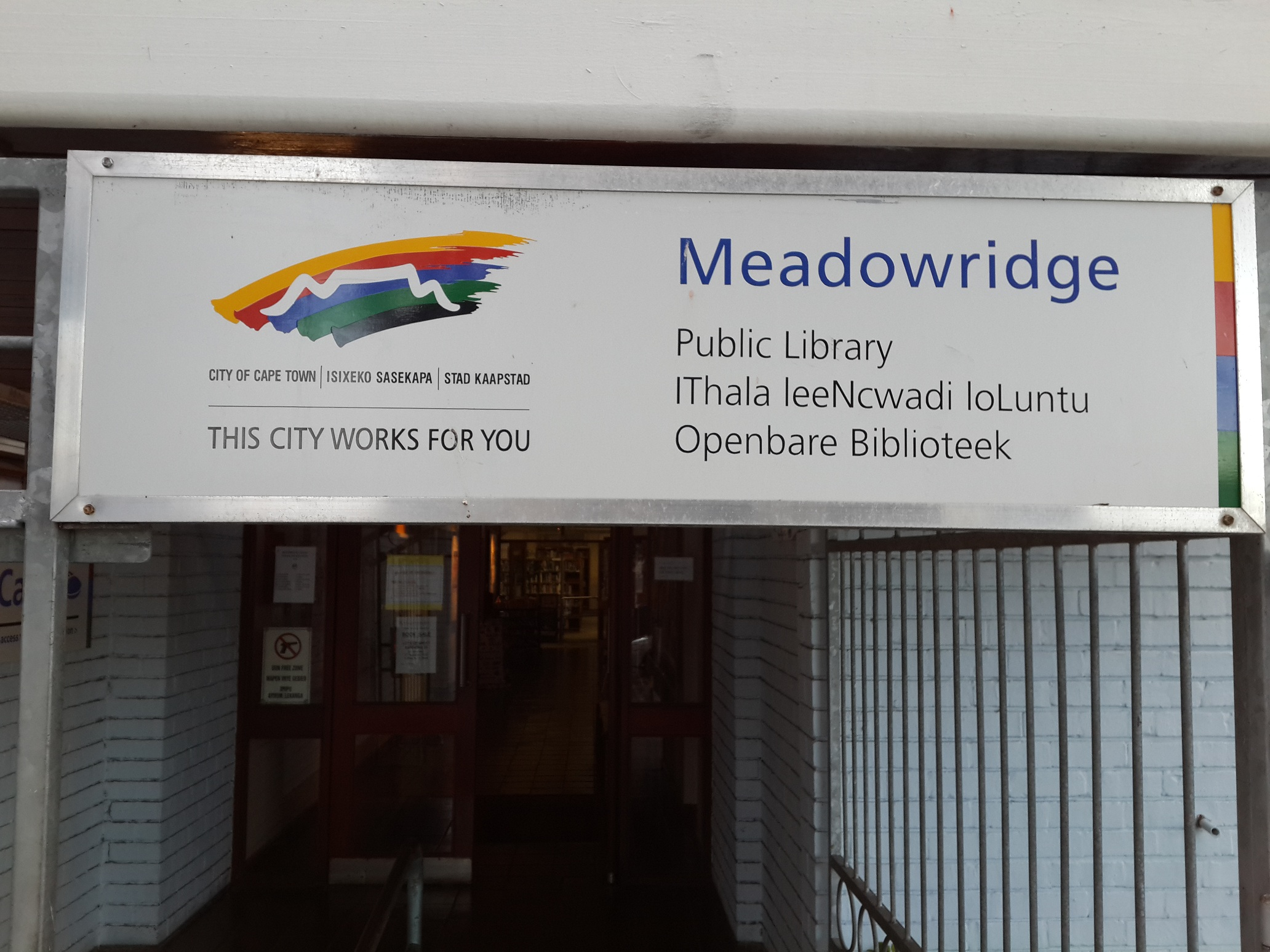
Entrance sign

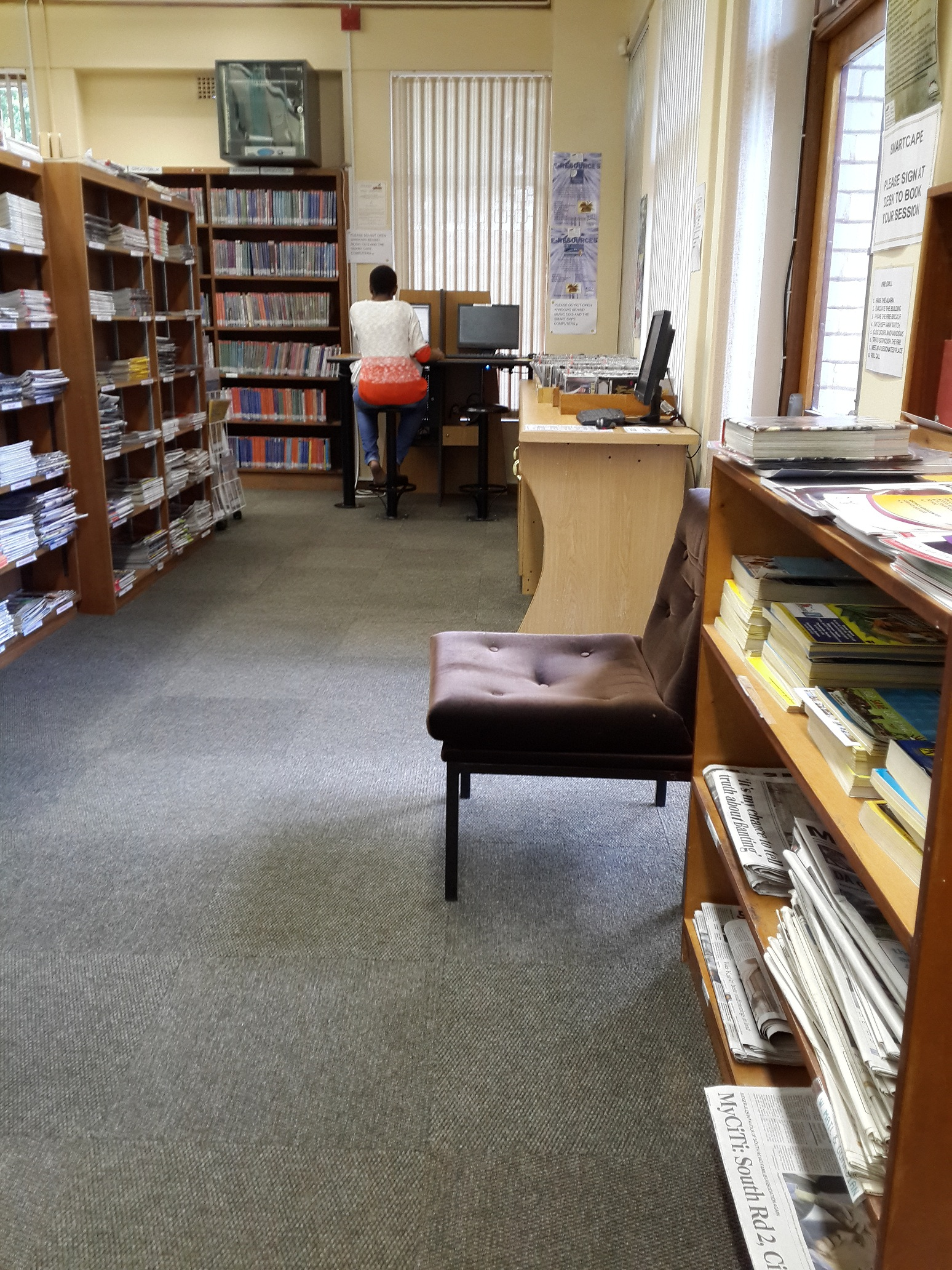
Smart Cape public access computers

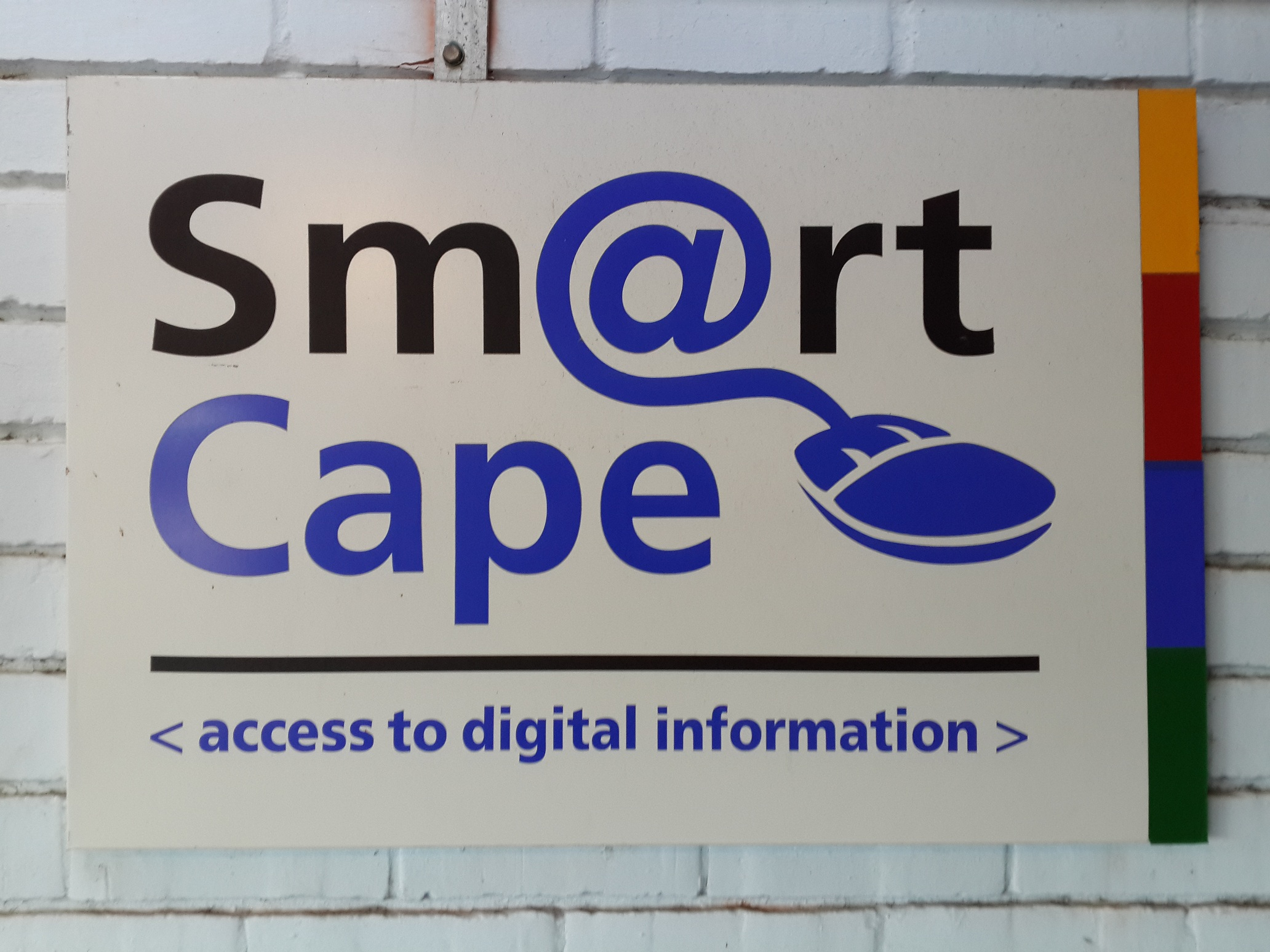
Smart Cape sign at the entrance to the library
