= Meadowridge =

Suburb of Cape Town, South Africa

- Suburb
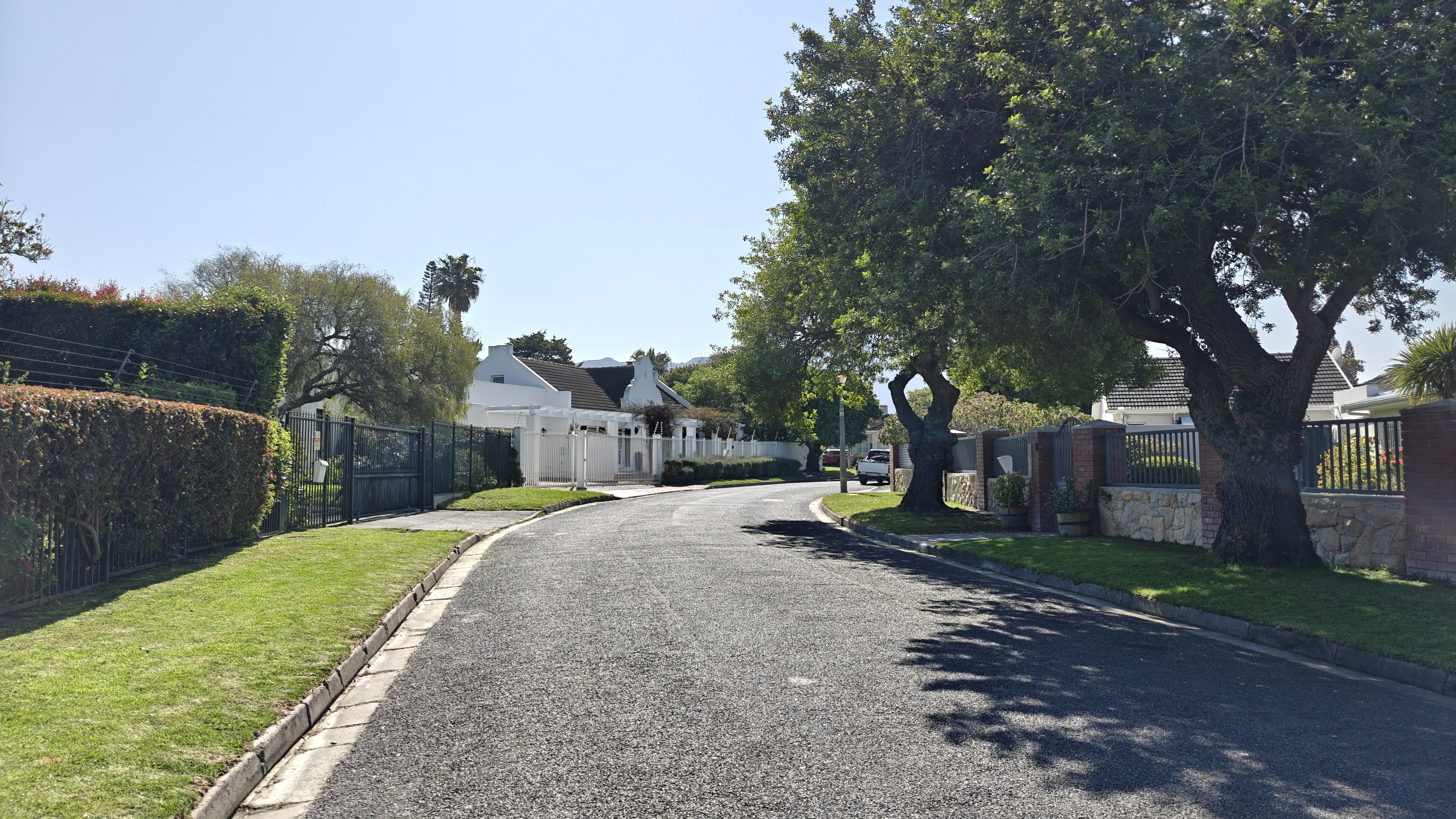
- Detached houses in a Meadowridge street
- Interactive map of Meadowridge
- Coordinates: 34°2′S 18°27′E
- Country: South Africa
- Province: Western Cape
- Municipality: City of Cape Town
- Main Place: Cape Town

Area
  - Total: 1.34 km^{2} (0.52 sq mi)

Population (2011)
  - Total: 2,519
  - Density: 1,880/km^{2} (4,870/sq mi)

Racial makeup (2011)
  - Black African: 5.2%
  - Coloured: 5.7%
  - Indian/Asian: 1.0%
  - White: 85.9%
  - Other: 2.3%

First languages (2011)
  - English: 90.1%
  - Afrikaans: 8.3%
  - Other: 1.6%
- Time zone: UTC+2 (SAST)
- Postal code (street): 7806
- Area code: 021

Meadowridge is a small, affluent residential suburb in the Southern Suburbs region of Cape Town, South Africa. It is the second garden city in Cape Town, and was officially opened on 23 March 1955.

== Geography ==
Meadowridge is situated in the Southern Suburbs region of Cape Town - an area known for its tree-lined streets, parks, peaceful lifestyle, detached homes, and affluent homebuyers.

The suburb is bordered by Bergvliet and the M3 to the west and south, Constantia to the north, and Diep River to the east. Boundary Road separates Meadowridge and Diep River, Kendal Road separates it from Constantia, and Ladies Mile Road (among others) separates it from Bergvliet.

Meadowridge provides residents with easy access to the M3 freeway, which runs north to Cape Town CBD, and south to Westlake.

It is situated 10km from Muizenberg Beach, 4km from the Constantia wine valley, and 20km from Cape Town's CBD.

== Culture ==
The suburb contains Meadowridge Library, one of Cape Town's top circulating libraries, which serves its home suburb and surrounding neighborhoods.

The suburb houses the Meadowridge Sports Facility and Meadowridge Tennis Club.

Meadowridge also contains a considerable number of parks, in the context of the suburb's size. The largest can be found in the north and center of the neighborhood.

== Housing ==
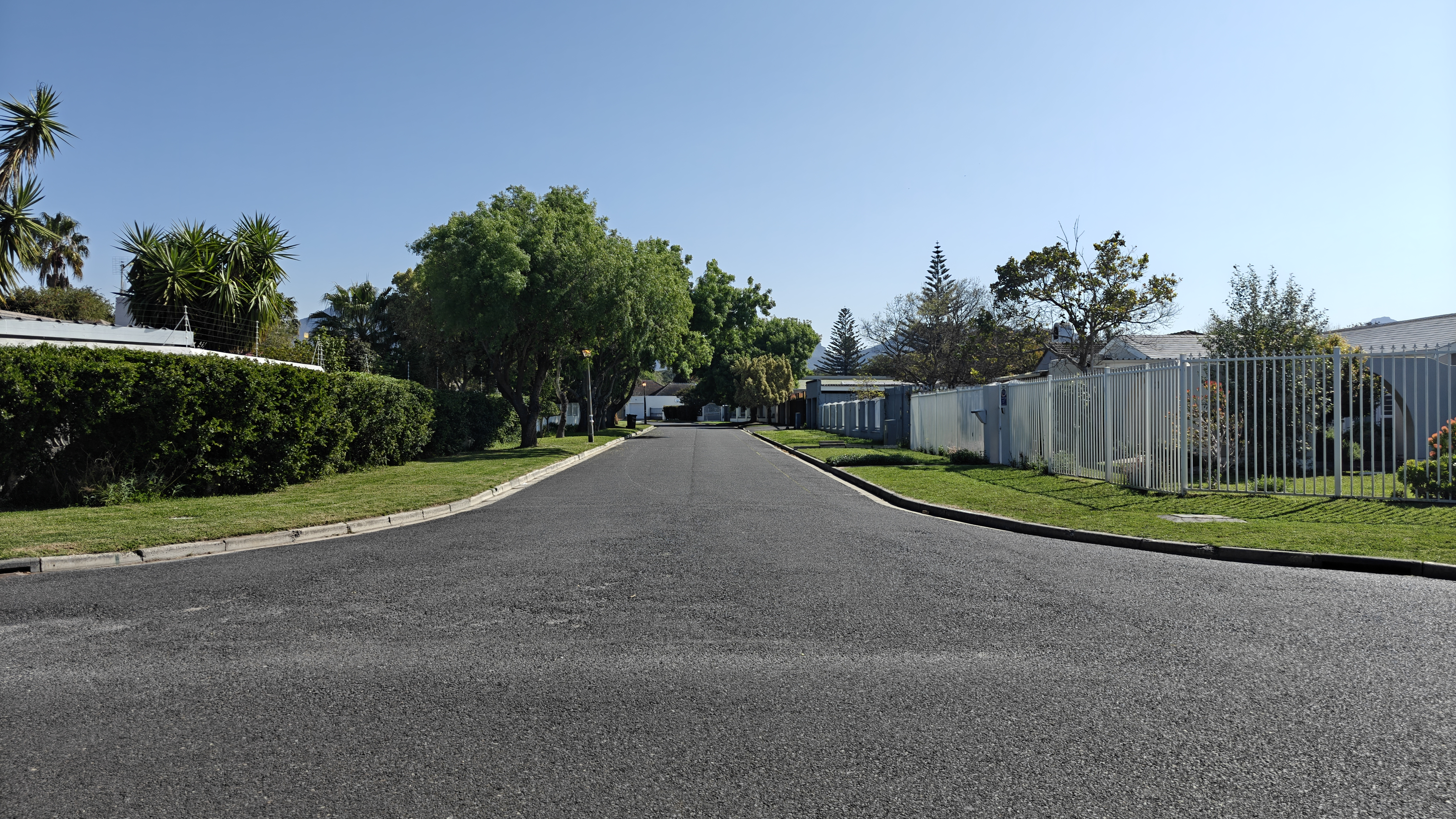
A street in Meadowridge

Meadowridge contains mainly detached houses, on large plots. The suburb has tranquil, tree-lined streets. In September 2025, the average price for a house in Meadowridge was R5.8 million.

== Education ==
While Meadowridge does not contain any educational institutions, nearby schools in Bergvliet include Bergvliet Primary School, Sweet Valley Primary School, and Bergvliet High School.

== Commerce ==
There are not many commercial plots in Meadowridge, as the suburb is predominantly residential. Most of Meadowridge comprises medium-sized detached homes, however, the suburb is home to Meadowridge Park n Shop, a shopping center.

The neighborhood is also close to other commercial locations such as the Constantia Village and Constantia Emporium shopping centers, and Blue Route shopping mall.
