= Golda Selzer =

South African pathologist

Doctor Golda Selzer
- Born: January 1, 1910; Brandfort, Orange Free State
- Died: January 1, 1999 (aged 89)

Academic background
- Education: University of Cape Town

Academic work
- Discipline: Pathologist
- Influenced: SHAWCO

Golda Selzer (1910–1999) was an academic and pathologist at Groote Schuur Hospital, and co-founder of SHAWCO. Selzer published extensively with over 50 articles of which more than 15 were on poliomyelitis.

== Early life ==
Golda Selzer was born in Brandfort in the Orange Free State in 1910.

She received her MBChB from the University of Cape Town in 1932. Golda was acting superintendent at the City Hospital in Infectious Diseases in 1934 and subsequently joined the Pathology Department at the Medical School of the University of Cape Town at Groote Schuur Hospital.

The South African Council for Scientific and Industrial Research (CSIR) created the Virus Research Unit in the Department of Pathology in 1948 under Professor Van den Ende and Selzer was part of this very dynamic team. Selzer and Prof Alfred Polson were one of the first researchers to grow the polio virus in tissue culture and describe its physical and antigenic properties. She also developed a mouse model to understand the development of paralytic polio. Selzer was the first person to grow the Rubella virus from an aborted foetus from a mother who had been infected with Rubella. This was a key link in understanding the genesis of congenital heart defects associated with children born from mothers infected with this virus.

In 1971, she went to work in the Pathology Department of the Tel Hashomer Hospital in Israel.
