= Kloof Street =

One of the main streets in Cape Town CBD

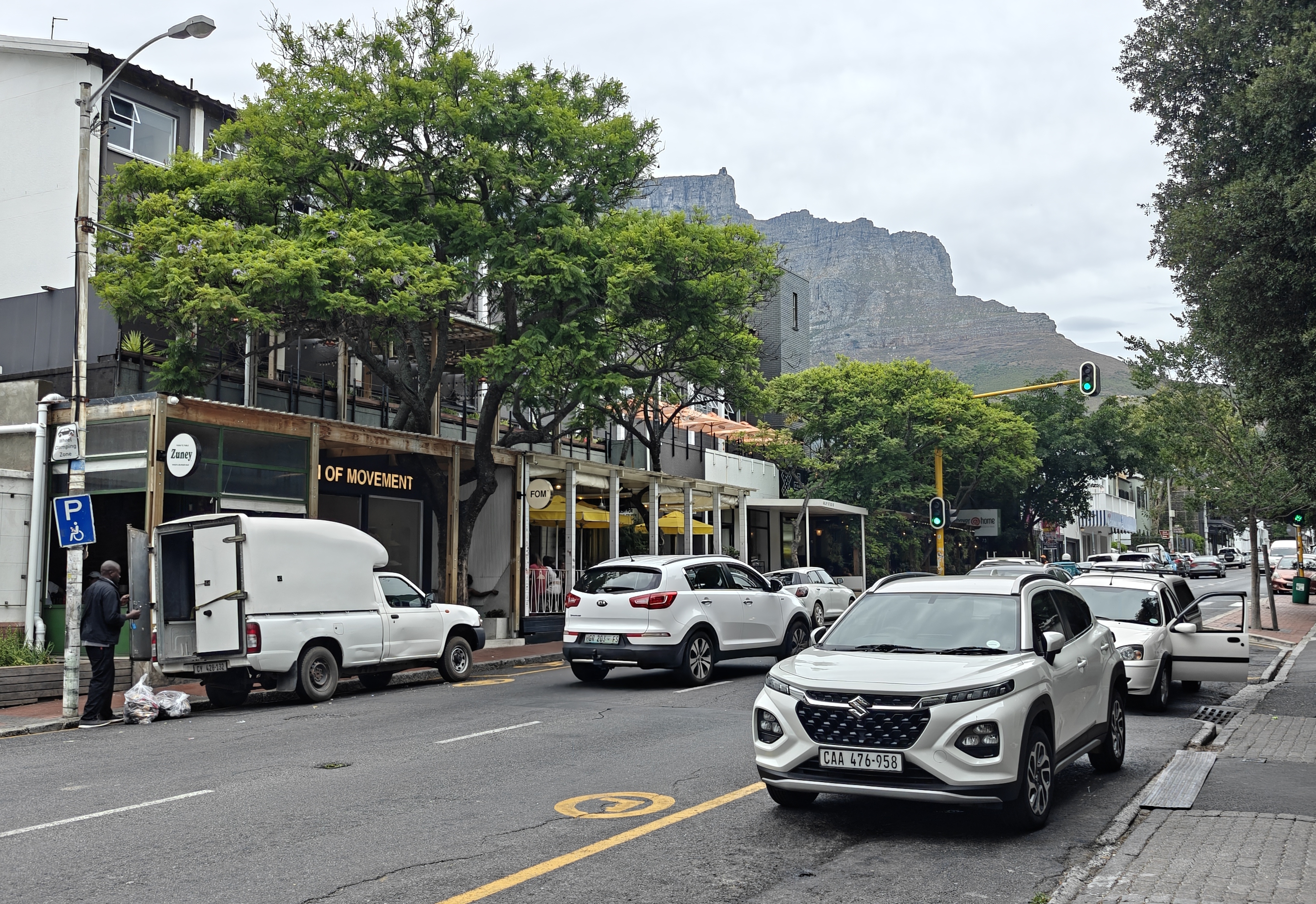
- View westwards up Kloof Street, towards Table Mountain and Leeuwenhof
- Interactive map of Kloof Street
- Maintained by: The City of Cape Town
- Length: 1.4 km (0.87 mi)
- Width: Double vehicle lane plus double sidewalks
- Location: Gardens, Cape Town, South Africa
- Postal code: 8001
- Coordinates: 33°55′44.612″S 18°24′39.136″E
- From: Upper Kloof Street & Leeuwenhof Road (east)
- Major junctions: Kamp Street
- To: Buitensingel Road (west)

Other
- Known for: Cultural, busy atmosphere, and international recognition of such

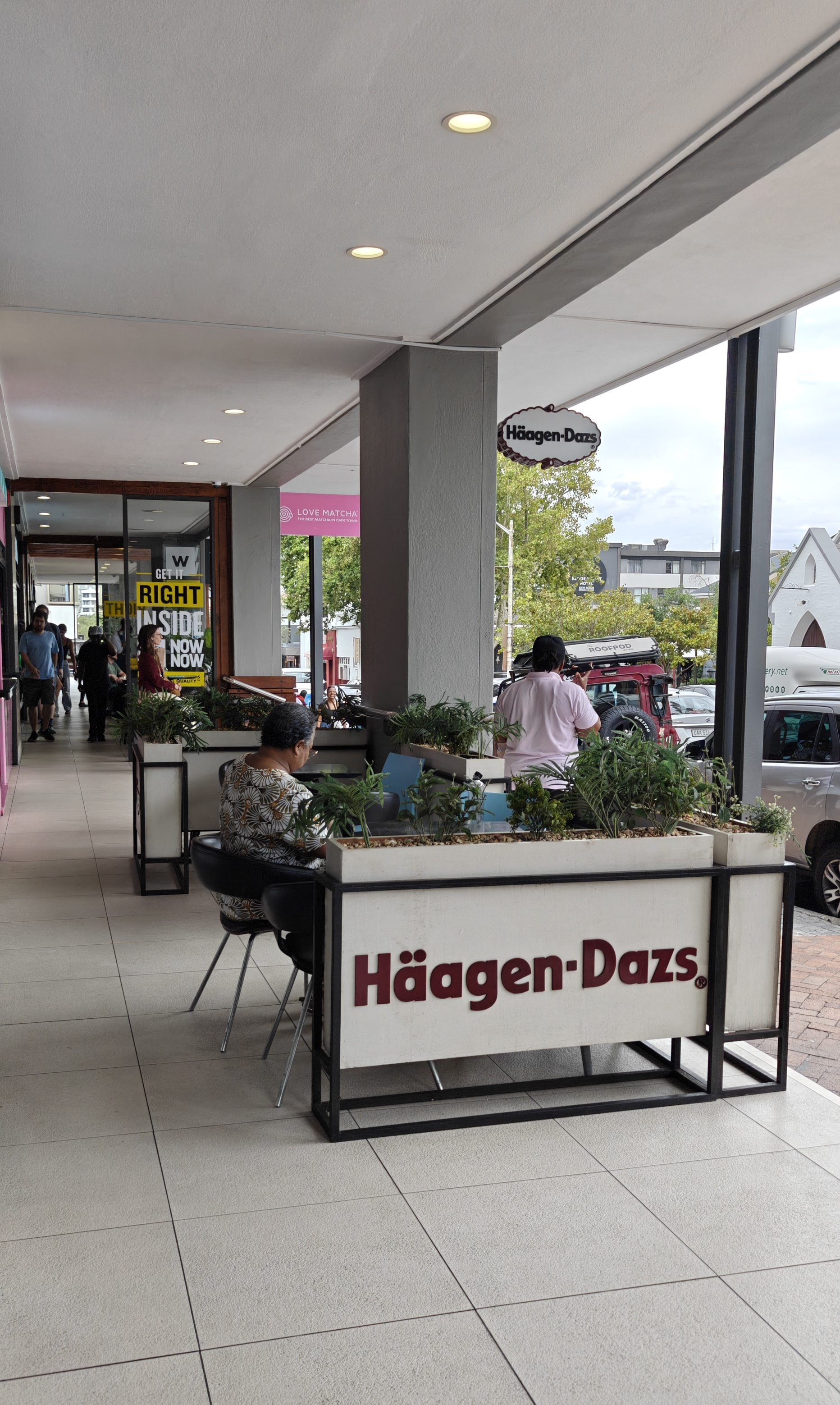
View eastwards down Kloof Street, near the entrance to Lifestyle on Kloof shopping center

Kloof Street is a major road in the suburb of Gardens, in Cape Town, South Africa. At approximately 1.4 kilometers long, it features a single vehicle lane in each direction, as well as sidewalks on each side of the road.

The road runs east to west, from the middle of Gardens on the eastern side to the start of Cape Town CBD on the western side. At its eastern end, the road branches into Upper Kloof Street and Leeuwenhof Road, near the Leeuwenhof estate - the official residence of the Premier of the Western Cape. At its western end, it intersects with Buitensingel Street (the northern end of the M3 freeway).

Kloof Street is well-known, both locally and by foreigners, for its cultural, busy atmosphere. It is home to many restaurants, cafés, and stores (especially on its eastern end), and is a popular street for pedestrians to walk along for leisure activities.

== Location ==
Kloof Street runs east to west, from the middle of Gardens to the edge of Cape Town CBD. The road intersects with Kamp Street near its eastern end, which leads past De Waal Park, towards Upper Orange Street (M96) - one of Cape Town CBD's major roads.

At its western end, Kloof Street intersects with Buitensingel Street. Buitensingel is the name of the final segment of the northern end of the M3, a 23-kilometer major Cape Town freeway that begins on its southern end in suburb of Westlake.

== Name ==
The word "Kloof" is Afrikaans for a canyon, ravine, or valley. On its eastern end, Kloof Street terminates near a large valley (paved for vehicles) that bisects the Table Mountain National Park, between Table Mountain and Lion's Head.

== Features ==
Kloof Street has two passenger vehicle lanes - one in each direction - as well as standard width sidewalks on both sides, no median dividing the road, and streetside parking on both sides.

While frequented by pedestrians, Kloof Street does not feature bicycle lanes, nor is it near to any streets that do.

The MyCiTi BRT system operates along Kloof Street, and includes (upwards - from east to west), the Lower Kloof, Welgemeend, and Upper Kloof bus stops. There are no dedicated lanes for the BRT system in Kloof Street, and buses share the road with passenger vehicles.

== Notability and recognition ==
Kloof Street is well known, and recognized by locals and visitors alike for being one of the main streets in Cape Town to visit for a mix of restaurants, cafés, and stores of various kinds. The street is very popular for pedestrians to wander along for leisure activities.

Amidst Cape Town receiving numerous prestigious awards, in 2025, Kloof Street was named among the World's Coolest Streets by publication Time Out. Kloof Street ranked 22nd overall, and 1st in Africa.

For the awards list, Time Out asked its global network of local editors to nominate the street that epitomized the very best of their respective cities. The publication's global travel team subsequently refined the list, ranking each street against criteria including food, drink, culture, fun, and community.

Time Out stated that Kloof Street, "captures the essence of Cape Town’s urban charm". The publication further said that the street, framed by the leafy slopes of Table Mountain, is where the is where the edge suburbs of the City Bowl meet the creative vibe of Cape Town CBD. Time Out also said that Kloof Street features "equal parts heritage and hipster", and "[combines] new locations with old world character".

When anti-apartheid activist, former member of the Democratic Party opposition, and former South African Ambassador to the United States Harry Schwarz moved to Cape Town in 1934, he stayed in a house on Kloof Street.

== Major addresses ==
Kloof Street is home to the following major locations:

- Lifestyle on Kloof shopping center
- Longkloof Building (including Workshop 17 coworking space)
- Yoco headquarters (major fintech)
- Museum of Illusions, Cape Town
- Laerskool Jan Van Riebeeck (primary school)
- Hoërskool Jan van Riebeeck (high school)
- Buiten Kloof Studios condos
- Earlgo condos
- Woodside condos
- McDonald's Long Street
- Kloof Street Park
- Kloof Street Public Library

== See also ==
- Gardens, Cape Town
- Kloof Nek Road
