= Muizenberg Library =

Muizenberg Library is a public library in Cape Town, South Africa

- 34.1067°S 18.4707°E
- Location: Corner of Atlantic and Beach Roads, Muizenberg, Cape Town, 7950, South Africa
- Type: Public Library
- Established: 10 April 1910
- Branch of: City of Cape Town Library and Information Services

Access and use
- Population served: 36,857

Muizenberg Library is a public library in Muizenberg, Cape Town, South Africa. It is one of 102 libraries within the City Cape Town Library and Information Service.

== History ==
Muizenberg Library was originally built with a $7,800 grant from the Carnegie Library Foundation. The Muizenberg Carnegie Library building at 186 Main Road was designed by architects N.T. Cowin and John Lyon. The library was officially opened on 10 April 1910 by the Honourable Frederick de Waal. The library moved to its current location after the original building became inadequate for the services provided, The Carnegie Library building now forms part of a Police Museum.

== Services ==
Muizenberg Library offers fiction and non-fiction collections in many of South Africa's official languages as well as DVD and music collections. The library hosts a story time for babies, toddlers and their carers every Tuesday morning at 10am and a variety of activities for children and homeschool groups, including book talks and author events for adult patrons.

The library collection can be searched online through the City of Cape Town's Online Public Access Catalogue (OPAC). Workstations and computers are available as well as SmartCape Internet access.

== Library Hours ==
Days	Opening Hours
Monday	10:00 - 17:00
Tuesday	10:00 - 17:00
Wednesday	10:00 - 17:00
Thursday	10:00 - 17:00
Friday	09:00 - 14:00
Saturday	09:00 - 12:00
Sunday	CLOSED
