= City of Cape Town Library and Information Services =

Public library system of the City of Cape Town metropolitan government

- 33.928000°S 18.488972°E
- Location: 88 Berkley Rd, Ndabeni, Cape Town, 7405, South Africa
- Branches: 102

Other information
- Director: Ninnie Steyn
- Website: https://www.capetown.gov.za/departments/library-and-information-services-department/

The City of Cape Town Library and Information Services is the public library system of the City of Cape Town metropolitan government in Cape Town, South Africa. It manages 101 libraries and one satellite library.

== Library network and list of libraries ==
Adriaanse Public Library

Athlone Public Library

Avondale Public Library

Belhar Public Library

Bellville Public Library

Bellville South Public Library

Bishop Lavis Public Library

Bloubergstrand Public Library

Bonteheuwel Public Library

Bothasig Public Library

Brackenfell Public Library

Bridgetown Public Library

Brooklyn Public Library

Camps Bay Public Library

Central Public Library

Claremont Public Library

Colin Eglin Sea Point Public Library

Crossroads Public Library

Delft Public Library

Delft South Public Library

Dunoon Public Library

Durbanville Public Library

Edgemead Public Library

Eerste River Public Library

Eikendal Public Library

Elsies River Public Library

Fisantekraal Public Library

Fish Hoek Public Library

Goodwood Public Library

Gordon's Bay Public Library

Grassy Park Public Library

Gugulethu Public Library

Hangberg Public Library

Hanover Park Public Library

Harare Public Library

Heideveld Public Library

Hout Bay Public Library

Hugenot Square Public Library

Kensington Public Library

Khayelitsha Public Library

Kloof Street Public Library

Koeberg Public Library

Kuyasa Public Library

Lansdowne Public Library

Leonsdale Public Library

Lotus Rover Public Library

Lwandle Public Library

Kommetjie Public Library

Kraaifontein Public Library

Kuils River Public Library

Kulani Public Library

Langa Public Library

Lentegeur Public Library

Macassar Public Library

Maitland Public Library

Mamre Public Library

Manenberg Public Library

Masakhane Public Library

Masiphumelele Public Library

Meadowridge Public Library

Melton Rose Public Library

Mfuleni Public Library

Milnerton Public Library

Moses Mabhiba Public Library

Mowbray Public Library

Muizenberg Public Library

Nazeema Isaacs Public Library

Nyanga Public Library

Observatory Public Library

Ocean View Public Library

Ottery Public Library

Parow Public Library

PD Paulse Public Library

Pelican Park Satellite Public Library

Philippi East Public Library

Pinelands Public Library

Plumstead Public Library

Ravensmead Public Library

Retreat Public Library

Rocklands Public Library

Rondebosch Public Library

Rylands Public Library

Scottsdene Public Library

Simon's Town Public Library

Sir Lowry's Pass Public Library

Somerset West Public Library

Southfield Public Library

Strand Public Library

Strandfontein Public Library

Table View Public Library

Tafelsig Public Library

Tokai Public Library

Town Centre Public Library

Tyger Valley Public Library

Valhalla Park Public Library

Vredehoek Public Library

Weltevreden Public Library

Westfleur Public Library

Westridge Public Library

Woodstock Public Library

Wynberg Public Library
