= Masiphumelele Library =

Masiphumelele Library is a public library in Cape Town, South Africa

Coordinates: 34°07′42.1″S 18°22′41.2″E

- Location: 1572 Mothapeng Street, Masiphumelele, Fish Hoek, Cape Town, 7975, South Africa
- Type: Public Library
- Established: 1997
- Branch of: City of Cape Town Library and Information Services

Access and use
- Population served: 15,969

Masiphumemele Library is a public library in Masiphumelele, Cape Town, South Africa. It is one of 102 libraries within the City of Cape Town Library and Information Services.

== History ==
Masiphumelele Library was established in 1997 when Jean Williams, Librarian-in-Charge of Ocean View Library negotiated two rooms for the library in an old farm house owned by the local municipality. The rest of the building was used by City of Cape Town’s Housing Department.

The original library opened on 16 April 1997. In 1999 residents of Masiphumelele, protesting against the Housing Department fire-bombed the offices and the library was also destroyed in the conflagration.

In 2003 Lyn Steyn and Sue Alexander of Fish Hoek Library taking the lead from Jean Williams, and, working with the Masiphumelele Corporation what was to become the new Masiphumelele Library. This library was run as a satellite of the Fish Hoek Library until 2010 when it was classified as a separate branch.

== Services ==
The library offers fiction and non-fiction books in English and the home languages of many of the residents of Masiphumelele. Workstations and computers are available as well as SmartCape Internet access.

== Library Hours ==
Day	Opening Hours
Monday	10:00 - 17:00
Tuesday	10:00 - 17:00
Wednesday	10:00 - 17:00
Thursday	10:00 - 17:00
Friday	09:00 - 13:00
Saturday	09:00 - 12:00
Sunday	CLOSED
