= Strandfontein Library =

Public library in Strandfontein, Cape Town, South Africa

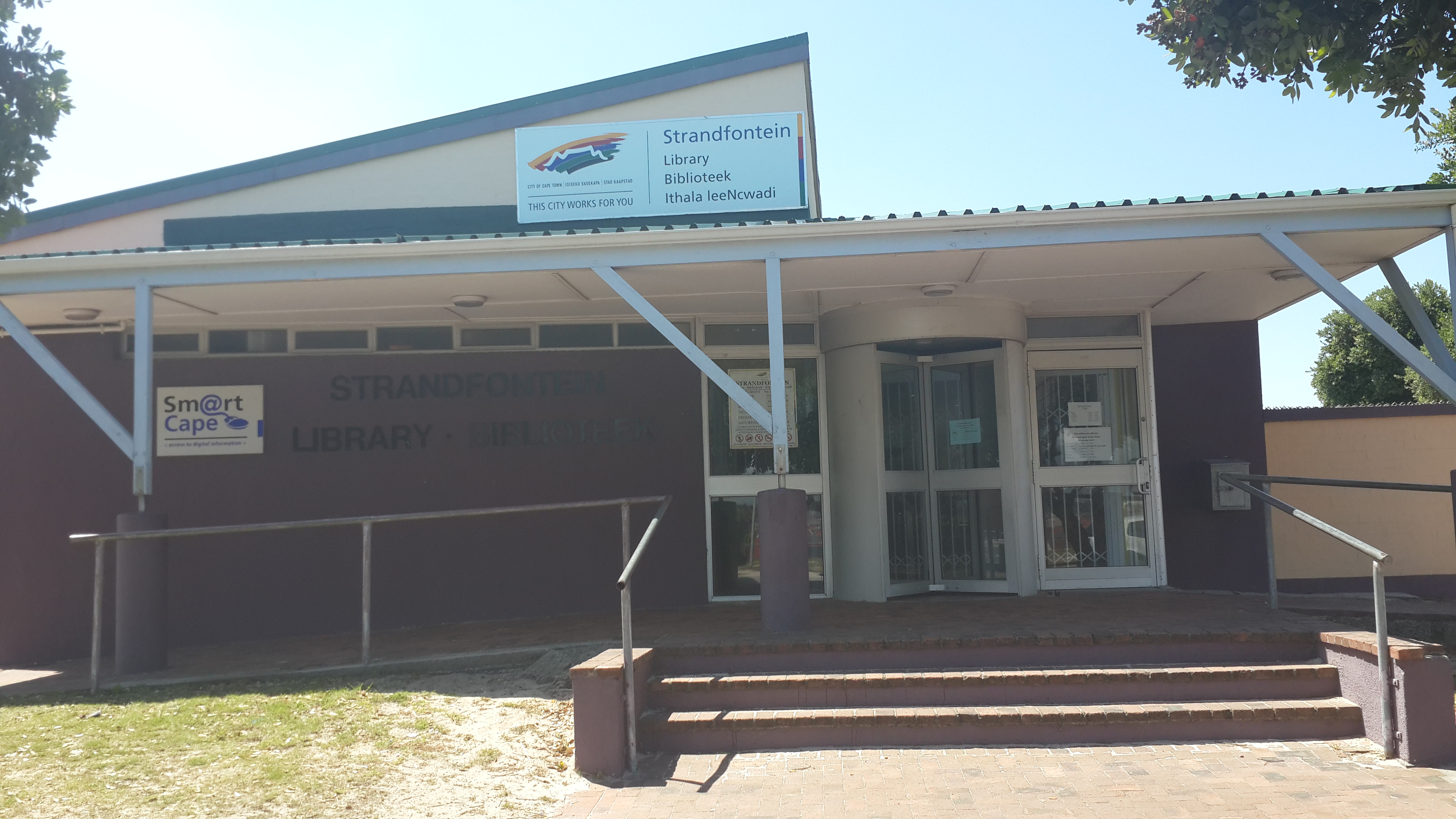
- Front entrance of Strandfontein Library
- 34.071862352200995°S 18.554656186627437°E
- Location: Corner of Welgelegen Road and Dennegeur Avenue, Strandfontein, Cape Town, South Africa
- Type: Public library
- Established: 1994
- Branch of: City of Cape Town Library and Information Services

Other information
- Website: CCT Libraries and Services (select Strandfontein)

Strandfontein Library is a public library in Strandfontein, Cape Town, South Africa. It is part of the City of Cape Town Library and Information Services. The library's holdings can be searched online via the City of Cape Town's Open Public Access Catalogue (OPAC).
