= Central Library Cape Town =

Public library in Cape Town, South Africa

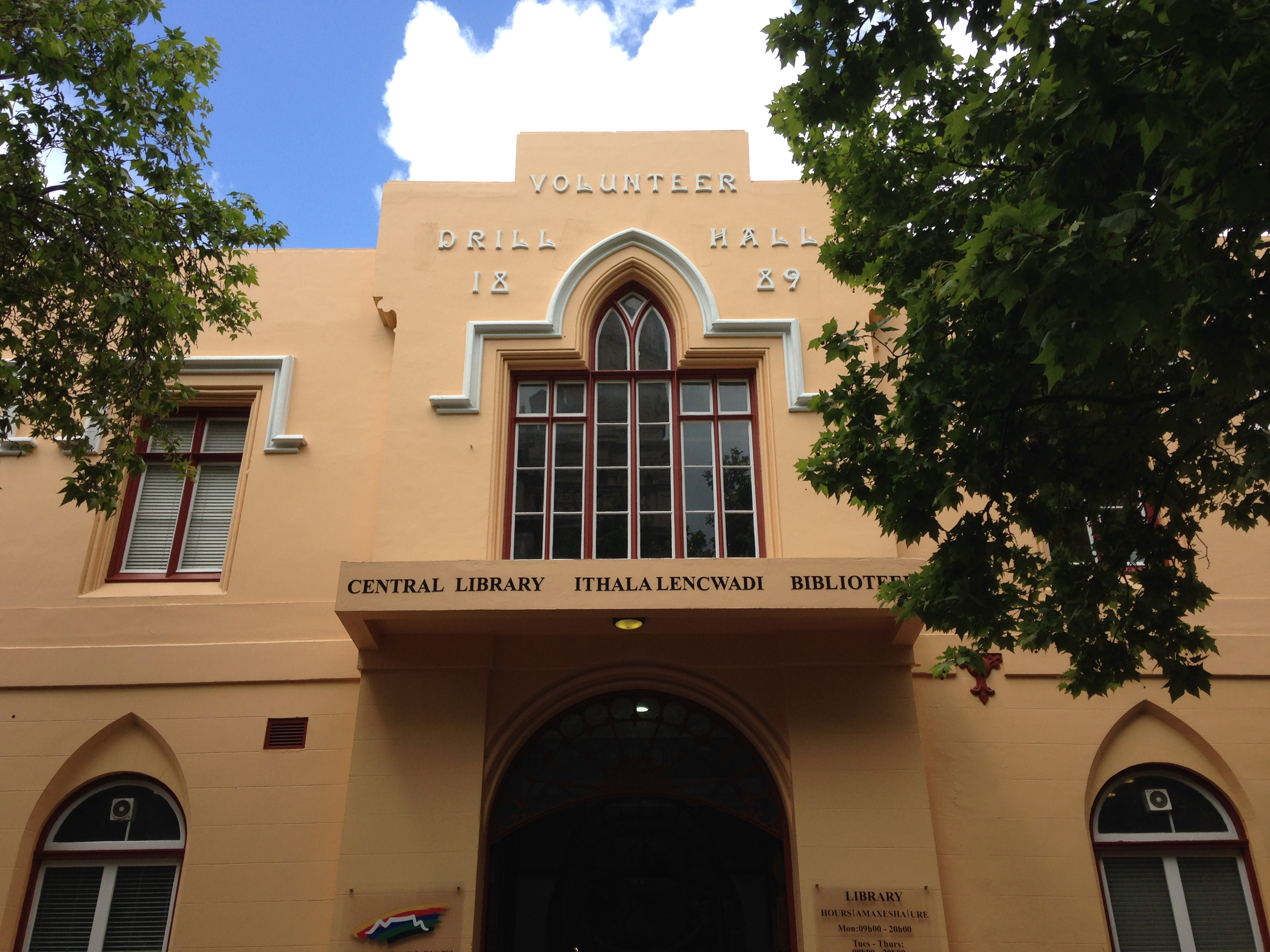
- Old Drill Hall
- 33.9259°S 18.4243°E
- Location: Old Drill Hall, Parade Street, Cape Town, South Africa
- Type: Public library
- Established: 1954
- Branch of: City of Cape Town Library and Information Services

Access and use
- Circulation: 357,412

Other information
- Website: Central Public Library

Location Central Library in Cape Town.

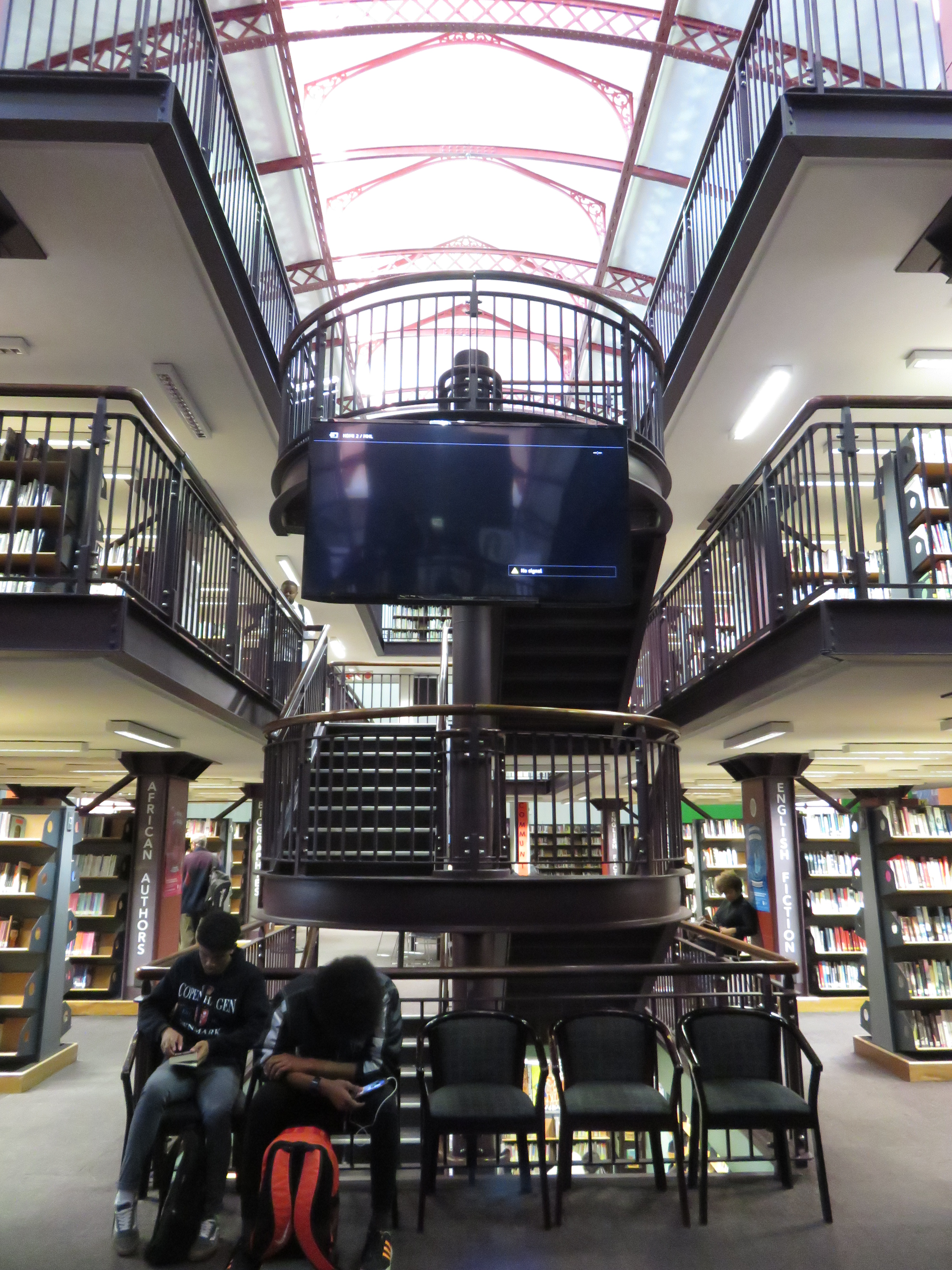
Interior of the library

Central Library Cape Town is a public library in Cape Town, South Africa. It is one of 102 libraries within the City of Cape Town Library and Information Services.

Central Library includes lending and reference services as well as specialised art and music sections. There are 90 plus computers plus free Wi-Fi for library members. The library offers books, CDs, DVDs, audiobooks and magazines for loan. It is the only public library in Cape Town with books in all 11 official languages and also has books in foreign languages.

== Introduction ==
Central Library was established in 1954 when the Cape Town City Libraries took over the subscription library of the South African Library. In 1962 the library moved to the Waalburg building in the city centre. In 1982 the library moved again, this time to Cape Town's City Hall. The library received two grants from the Carnegie Corporation which allowed the library collections to be significantly improved and extended and a computer centre was established. The City of Cape Town, provided funds for a new library to be established in the Old Drill Hall. Central Library opened in this new permanent site in 2008.

== History ==
There has been a public library in the centre of Cape Town since 1818 when the South African Public Library (SAPL) was established. This was a free library until 1829 when it became a subscription library. In 1952 the Cape Town City Library Service (CTLS) was established to create a free municipal library service for Cape Town. In December 1954, after negotiations, the CTLS took over the subscription library of the South African Public Library, buying the stock and renting the reading room. Central Library was established and opened to the public in January 1955. In 1956 a branch was opened in Long Street which included non-fiction books, children's books and music. In 1962 Central moved from SAPL to SANLAM building, Waal Street. The music section was also moved from Long Street to this building. In 1965 the Central and Long Street branches were amalgamated to form a new and enlarged Central branch. Apartheid legislation affected the service offered by libraries. The 1953 Reservation of Separate Amenities Act resulted in libraries being designated for specific library groups. In 1969 City Park library was opened and all "non-white" members of Central were transferred to City Park Library. However the Central information and Music libraries could still be used by ‘non-white" members.

== Art Library ==
One of only two public art libraries in South Africa. The library covers all aspects of arts and crafts and is especially strong in African and South African art; Photography; Fashion and Graphic Design. The library is well used by students and local craftsmen and artists. The art library, as a specialised department within Central, opened in 1965.

== The Performing Arts & Music Library ==
A music library was included in the Long Street Library when it opened in 1956. The library included gramophone records, sheet music and the Evelyn Fincken Collection and the collection of the Cape Guild of Organists. The first issue of gramophone records in South Africa by a public library was on 5 July 1956 from the Long Street Library.

== Computing Facilities ==
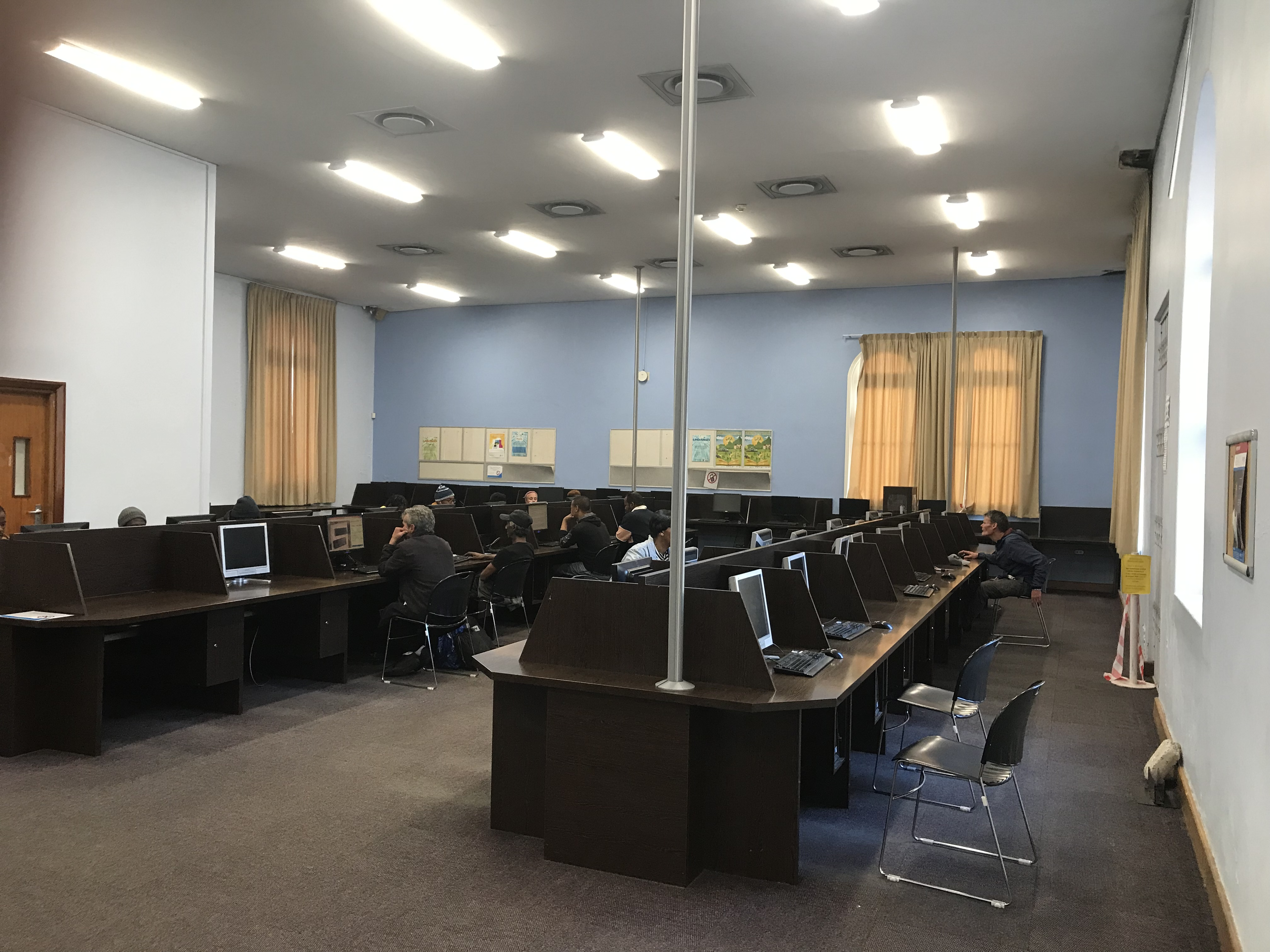
Computer Lab - Cape town Central Library

The library is equipped with public-use computers and offers free Wi‑Fi, courtesy of the SmartCape Access Project. Advanced Tech lies the American Corner, including a fully equipped Makerspace for hands-on innovation and incubation, with funding from the US Consulate. Aside from technology, the library hosts regular digital literacy workshops, alongside events like coding sessions and Power of Coding programs, some tailored for learners and youth.
