= Simon's Town Library =

Public library in Cape Town, South Africa

- 34.193810°S 18.436760°E
- Location: St George's St, Simon's Town, Cape Town, 7975, South Africa
- Type: Public Library
- Architect: John Parker
- Branch of: City of Cape Town Library and Information Services

Access and use
- Population served: 6,569

Simon's Town Library is a public library in Simon's Town, Cape Town, South Africa. It is a satellite branch of the Fish Hoek Library. It is one of 102 libraries within the City of Cape Town Library and Information Services.

== History ==
Agnes Agnew was the first appointed librarian of the then Simon’s Town Municipal Library.

The building housing the library was designed by architect John Parker and built in 1896. It served as the Simon's Town School until a new high school was built in 1953 and the municipality offices moved into the building.

In 2001 the municipal office moved to Plumstead, and the library, which had been housed in a nearby building moved in to the ground floor rooms.

Simon's Town Library is one of the few libraries in Cape Town that have served their communities for over 100 years.

== Services ==
The library offers fiction and non-fiction book collections in English, Afrikaans and a variety of other South African languages as well as CDs, DVDs audio and e-books via the Libby app by Overdrive. The library collection can be searched online through the City of Cape Town's Online Public Access Catalogue (OPAC). Workstations and computers are available as well as SmartCape Internet access.

== Library Hours ==
Day	Opening Hours
Monday	10:00 - 16:00
Tuesday	10:00 - 16:00
Wednesday	10:00 - 16:00
Thursday	10:00 - 16:00
Friday	09:00 - 14:00
Saturday	09:00 - 12:00 Alternating Saturdays
Sunday	CLOSED
