= SHAWCO =

Organisation at the University of Cape Town

Students' Health and Welfare Centres Organisation (SHAWCO)
- Formation: July 1943 ( 79 years )
- Founded: July 1943
- Founder: Andrew Kinnear, Golda Selzer
- Type: Student-run NGO
- Registration no.: NPO 002-830
- Purpose: Health and Education
- Headquarters: Groote Schuur Hospital Old Main Building - E47, Main Rd Observatory, Cape Town, 7935
- Location: [Primary Health Care Directorate] Faculty of Health Sciences, University of Cape Town Old Main Building, Groote Schuur Hospital, E47 Observatory, 7925, Cape Town, South Africa
- Region served: Cape Town metropolitan area
- Executive Director: Dr. Jackie Stewart
- President: Ramses Peigou Wonkam (Health), Amahle Gantsho (Education)
- Vice-President: Camryn Ferns (Health), Rayanha Isaacs & Bongeka Sibiya (Education)
- Employees: 9
- Volunteers: 3,000
- Website: www.shawco.org

SHAWCO, the Students' Health and Welfare Centre's Organization, is a student-run NGO based at the University of Cape Town that seeks to improve the quality of life for individuals in developing communities within the Cape Metropolitan area.

SHAWCO was founded in 1943 by Andrew Kinnear, a medical student who was moved to action by the need which he saw in the impoverished communities of Cape Town. The organization has grown over the years and now has 3000 student volunteers running over 15 health and education projects in five SHAWCO Centre's as well as other locations around the Cape Metropolitan area.

SHAWCO is divided into two main sectors: Education and Health. A third "staff sector" co-ordinates the SHAWCO community Centre's, transport, resource development, administrative oversight and project support.

A few of SHAWCO's developmental strategies include healthcare projects and multi-purpose community centers with skills training and recreation projects.

== History ==
SHAWCO was started in July 1943 by Andrew Kinnear, a University of Cape Town (UCT) medical student, who spent the vacation driving an ambulance to earn money to pay for his medical training. Andrew Kinnear asked Dr Golda Selzer of the Pathology Department at Groote Schuur Hospital to assist him in establishing a clinic. Dr Selzer became one of the cofounders of SHAWCO and remained SHAWCO honorary life president until her death in 1999. In 2001, Graça Machel agreed to become SHAWCO's new life president.

SHAWCO has since then grown, attracting over 900 UCT students, close to 300 foreign students, as well as about 20 community volunteers every year.

== SHAWCO Health ==
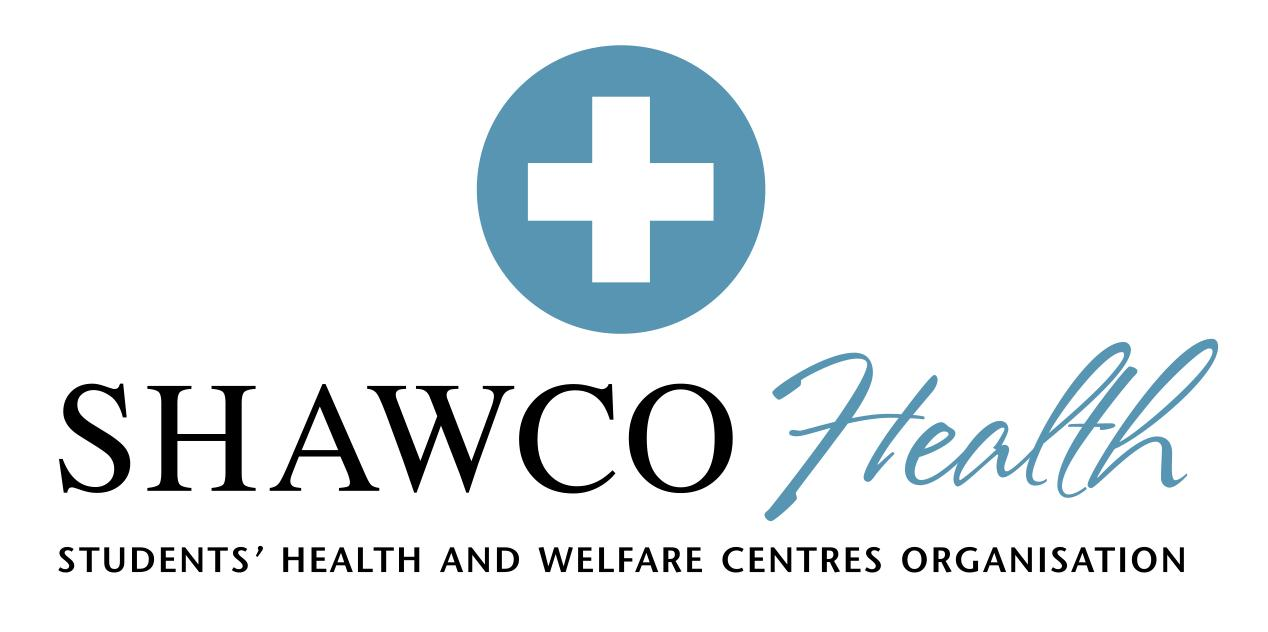

The free clinics run by SHAWCO rely on volunteer medical and allied health science students in all years of study and qualified doctors.

During clinics, around 25 patients are seen by medical students under the supervision of a qualified volunteer doctor who oversees the proceedings, verifies diagnoses and provides advice. Clinical year students are responsible for clerking, examination and treatment of the patients, while also guiding and teaching pre-clinical students who observe and examine patients under guidance.

=== Services offered ===
SHAWCO provides a primary health care service, treating conditions such as diarrhea, respiratory tract infections, sexually transmitted infections, muscular-skeletal ailments, and other non-specialty disease. The clinics provide holistic management, which includes care provided by physiotherapy, occupational therapy, speech therapy, dietetics, and audiology students. The pharmacy offers free drugs to patients attending the clinics. Students work very closely with community health workers within the community, who contribute to decisions made concerning the various clinics and help educate patients around specific health issues. When confronted with a patient requiring a higher level of care or a patient for whom facilities to treat are not available, the patient is referred to the local day hospital or secondary hospital.

=== Clinics ===
==== Evening clinics ====
SHAWCO Health co-ordinates six clinics which operate at night on a weekly basis in various Cape Town communities.

Communities Served:
Monday:	Tuesday:	Wednesday:
Newrest (in Gugulethu) Simthandile (in Khayelitsha) Barcelona (in Gugulethu)	Masiphumelele (in Noordhoek) Brown's Farm (in Philippi)	Imizamo Yethu (in Hout Bay) Hangberg (in Hout Bay) Wynberg

==== Pediatric clinics ====
The Saturday morning pediatric clinic alternates between Imizamo Yethu and Hangberg, both in Hout Bay, and Man Enberg.

SHAWCO also runs a Wednesday morning pediatric screening clinic, in collaboration with the School of Child and Adolescent Health at the University of Cape Town. These clinics often serve as the only port-of-call for community members who work during the day, or who cannot make the trip to the neighboring day hospital. The clinics either operate from permanent health facilities or from SHAWCO Health's three fully equipped mobile clinics.

=== Statistics ===
Year	Number of clinics	Number of local student volunteers	Number of international student volunteers	Total student volunteer sessions	Number patients
2011	251	600+	200+	2600+	5,130+
2010	248	644	180	2515	5,488
2009	180	557	No record	1970	4,806
2008	160	477	No record	2093	4,208
2007	134	No record	No record	No record	3,596
2003	115	+/- 150	No record	No record	2,005
1963	3 fixed sites	63% of all medical students at UCT	No record	No record	14,716

==== 2009 ====
In 2009 a new data capturing system was introduced to track student attendance, patient demography and disease characteristics.

Two-thirds of patients seen on the clinics were female, with the average age of patients 22 years. Approximately 44% of patients seen on the clinics were under the age of 18. The leading complaints on the clinics were respiratory tract infections (29.5%), skin rashes (16.5%), gastrointestinal disorders (14.9%), orthopedic and rheumatological complaints (9.6%) and sexually transmitted diseases (5.3%).

=== Additional projects ===
==== International Students Program ====
2009 was the first year S Health ran an international students project. In January 2009 a group of 12 Australian medical students from the University of New South Wales in their final year came over to South Africa for their elective block and ran the clinics. Traditionally, UCT students only begin SHAWCO clinics in February, thus the Australian students were able to add one extra month of services to the communities.

In June/July, 12 Norwegian Students came to run the clinics during UCT's three-week vacation, adding another three weeks to SHAWCO's services.

==== Rural Health Program ====
In July 2009, nine medical students, an audiologist and a nursing sister from Mowbray Maternity Hospital traveled to Coffee Bay in the Eastern Cape, an extremely rural part of South Africa where people have to travel for many hours to access health care. The team worked in partnership with Zithulele Hospital, running health promotional and educational activities in the local clinics, specifically pertaining to HIV and breastfeeding practices. Over five days, the students also ran clinics for over 360 patients, concurrently training around 60 clinic staff members regarding correct breastfeeding practices.

This was a pilot programme with the long-term vision being a multi-disciplinary intervention (health students, engineers, lawyers, social workers etc.) by students from various universities throughout South Africa.

The 2010 version of the Rural Health Programme brought with it some changes: the health focus was more on screening, with students offering blood pressure, weight, glucose, HIV and pap smear testing, as well as paediatric health screening. The UCT branch of Engineers Without Borders, EWB UCT, partnered with SHAWCO to develop and install rainwater-harvesting tanks, including filtration systems, at Zithulele Hospital.

==== Grand ward rounds ====
SHAWCO hosts grand ward rounds for all UCT medical students. These offer students the opportunity to report on cases they had seen on SHAWCO clinics and share their learning with their peers. In addition, there is always a guest speaker who addresses the students on a topic pertinent to primary health care (PHC). Previous topics have included "common dermatological problems encountered in PHC" and "PHC Paediatrics".

==== SHAWCO response to attacks on migrants, May 2008 ====
On 12 May 2008 a series of riots started in the township of Alexandra (in the north-eastern part of Johannesburg) when locals attacked migrants from Mozambique, Malawi and Zimbabwe. Many African nationals were threatened, assaulted and displaced in the wave of xenophobic violence that swept through South Africa, and in the following weeks the violence spread to Cape Town. SHAWCO responded to the needs of the people affected by this violence.

SHAWCO volunteers conveyed donated clothing, food and hygiene products which were distributed to the different sites of refuge around Cape Town. The Health sector, headed up by Thandi de Wit and Britta McLaren, working in partnership with other civil society organisations (Treatment Action Campaign and Médecins Sans Frontières), ran the first standardised assessment across 33 sites two days after the mass exodus of foreign nationals from the townships.

This assessment collected data on many things including numbers of men, women and children, shelter, food provision, health needs, health services, and safety. The framework used for this data collection later adopted by the City of Cape Town Disaster Management Team. From the data gathered, SHAWCO was able to identify sites in need of extra health support. SHAWCO ran an additional nine clinics to sites of refuge around the Cape Peninsula, treating over 600 people.

== SHAWCO Education ==

SHAWCO Education is a UCT student-run development programme which facilitates tutoring of school learners in previously disadvantaged communities and the focus of all projects is to help children learn. Academic subjects such as Maths, English, Science and Life Orientation are taught, as well as extra-curricular programmes. There are also several special interest projects which run sessions on topics such as environmental awareness, legal education, and entrepreneurship.

== Leadership ==
=== Education Leadership ===
Year	President	Vice President
2023	Amahle Gantsho	Rayanha Isaacs & Bongeka Sibiya
2022	Palesa Msomi	Keren Mbonga & Aqilah Regal
2021	Jaymo Reynolds	Lesedi Mokgobi
2020	Raeesa Mathews	Mbasa Gosa
2019	Eva Da Costa	Declan Dyer
2018	Kaylin Patterson	Sukayna Bassier
2017	Julian M. Siebert	Meshanya Naidoo
2016	Lebohang Mokoena	Nadia Solomon
2015	Ruth Urson	Pascal Despard
2014	Julia Norrish	Cleo Mazower
2013	Steven Bourhill	Senzo Hlophe
2012	Baveena Naidoo	Bakang Moetse
2011	Rachel Mazower	Maya Jaffer
2010	Yumna Moosa	Sheree Lang
2009	Jonathan Hodgson	Joanne Beckwith
2008	Jonathan Hodgson	Lauren Losper
2007	Nick Friedman	Dimakatso Morebudi

=== Health Leadership ===
Year	President	Vice President
2023	Ramses Peigou Wonkam	Camryn Ferns
2022	Christian Tereze	Amy Stessl
2021	Jenna Smith	Zi Yang He
2020	Sana Salduker	Robyn Kamau
2019	Danielle Hugo	Peace Francis
2018	James van Duuren	Behnazir Mohamed
2017	Melissa Kube	James van Duuren
