= Masiphumelele High School =

High school in Cape Town, South Africa

Coordinates: 34°7′43″S 18°22′46″E

Information
- Grades: 8-12
- Enrollment: 942 (2005)

Masiphumelele High School is a publicly owned secondary school (grades 8–12) in Masiphumelele in the Western Cape region of South Africa. As of 2005 it had some 942 students. The school has piped indoor water.

In February 2006 students of the school were involved in violent protests, which resulted in injuries to two teachers and damage to three police vehicles.
