= Kommetjie Library =

Public library in Cape Town, South Africa

- 34°08′28″S 18°19′27″E
- Location: Somerset Road, Kommetjie, 7975
- Type: Public Library
- Established: 1971
- Branch of: City of Cape Town Library and Information Services

Access and use
- Population served: 2,435

Kommetjie Library is a public library in Kommetjie, Cape Town, South Africa. It is one of 102 libraries within the City of Cape Town Library and Information Services.

== Services ==
The library offers fiction and non-fiction books in English, Afrikaans, Xhosa, Zulu, and a variety of other South African languages. Workstations and computers are available as well as SmartCape Internet access.

The library collection can be searched through the City of Cape Town Library and Information Service's Online Public Access Catalogue (OPAC).

The library offers collections of Lego and Duplo for younger patrons to use within the branch.

A bimonthly book club is offered for local residents.

== Library hours ==
As of November 2026 the opening hours of the library are as follows:

Day	Opening hours
Monday	10:00 - 16:00
Tuesday	10:00 - 16:00
Wednesday	10:00 - 16:00
Thursday	10:00 - 16:00
Friday	10:00 - 13:00
Saturday	09:00 - 12:00 alternating Saturdays
Sunday	CLOSED
