= Masiphumelele =

Suburb of Cape Town, Western Cape, South Africa

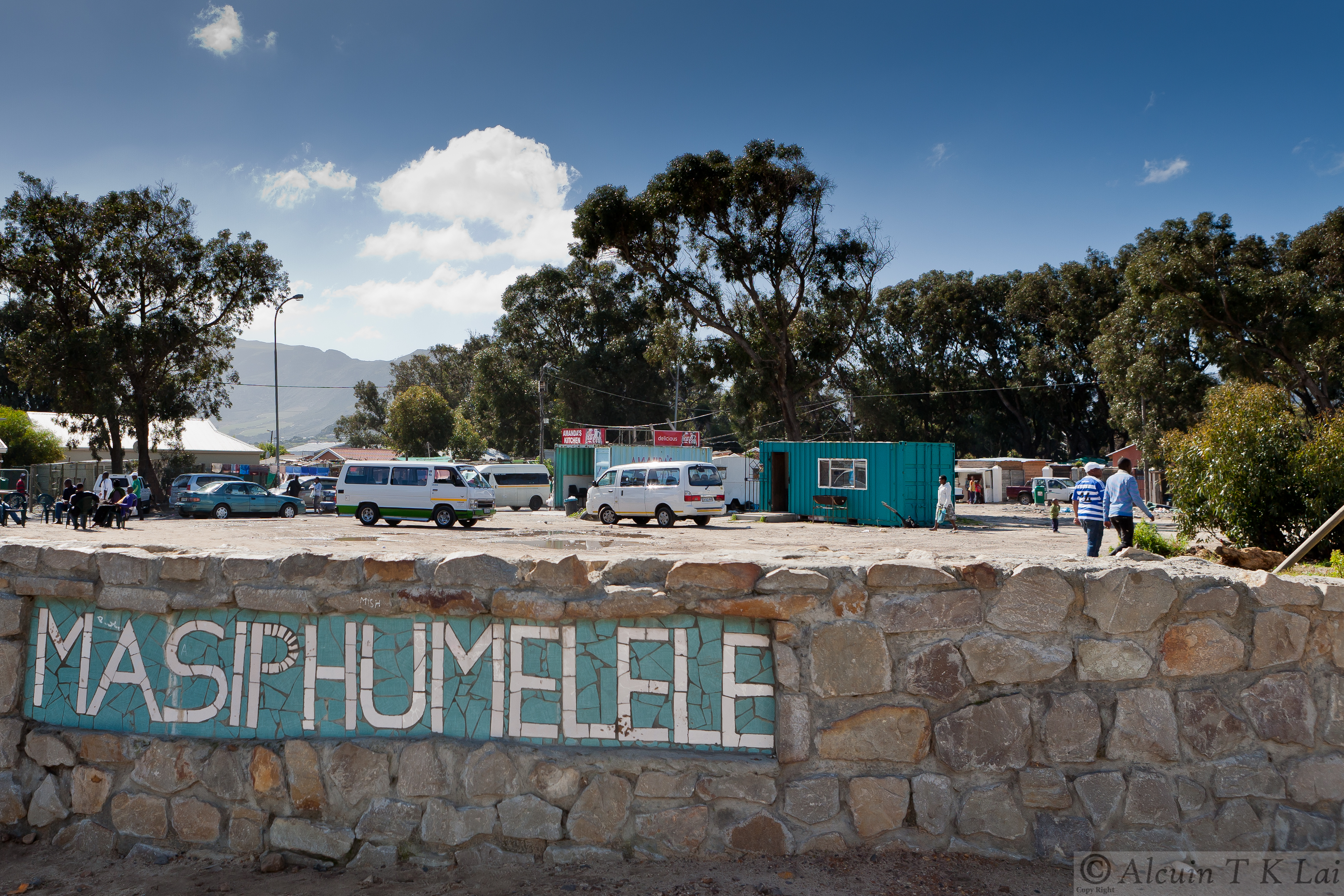
- Road sign in Masiphumelele township

- Location within Western Cape Location within South Africa
- Coordinates: 34°7′S 18°22′E
- Country: South Africa
- Province: Western Cape
- Municipality: City of Cape Town

Area
  - Total: 0.39 km^{2} (0.15 sq mi)

Population (2011)
  - Total: 15,969
  - Density: 41,000/km^{2} (110,000/sq mi)

Racial makeup (2011)
  - Black African: 89.4%
  - Coloured: 1.8%
  - Indian/Asian: 0.2%
  - White: 0.2%
  - Other: 8.5%

First languages (2011)
  - Xhosa: 58.1%
  - English: 7.6%
  - Afrikaans: 2.8%
  - Sotho: 1.6%
  - Other: 29.9%
- Time zone: UTC+2 (SAST)
- Postal code (street): 7975

Masiphumelele is a township on the Cape Peninsula, South Africa, situated between Kommetjie, Capri Village and Noordhoek.

Initially known as Site 5, the township was renamed Masiphumelele by its residents, which is a Xhosa word meaning "let us succeed".

About 400-500 people first settled in the area in the 1980s. During apartheid residents were continually removed to the suburb of Khayelitsha, over 30 km away, but the numbers began to grow as apartheid began to unravel from 1990.

In 1990, about 8000 residents lived in the area, mostly in shacks, but by 2005, over 26000 people lived there, many in brick homes. In 2010, the population was estimated at 38000. Many are from the old Ciskei bantustan in the Eastern Cape.

Amenities are scarce, with an overcrowded school, no police station, and an understaffed day clinic, while it is estimated that 23-28% of the community are infected with HIV, many of whom also have TB. SHAWCO, the University of Cape Town Student's Health And Welfare Centres Organisation, runs weekly supplementary clinics from the Masiphumelele clinic.

== History ==
Masiphumelele has been the site of numerous protests over the years. Most of the protests have been connected to service delivery and anger over corruption in government housing projects.

On May 12, 2008, a series of riots started in the township of Alexandra (in the north-eastern part of Johannesburg) when locals attacked migrants from Mozambique, Malawi and Zimbabwe. Many African nationals were threatened, assaulted and displaced in the wave of Xenophobic violence that swept through South Africa, and in the following weeks the violence spread to Cape Town. Thousands of foreigners were displaced from Masiphumelele in the attacks of May 2008, most landing up at Soetwater refugee camp. Several days after immigrant-owned shops were looted and foreigners attacked, Masiphumelele residents publicly apologised and asked them to return.

On May 2, 2011, a fire that started around 1 am engulfed and burned down an estimated 1500 informal and formal residences. The fire killed one and displaced an estimated 5000 people.

High rates of violent crime and a lack of appropriate policing in the area resulted in serious protest action by the community in 2015.

== See also ==
- Masiphumelele High School
- Masiphumelele Library
