= Kloof Nek Road =

Road from Cape Town CBD to Camps Bay

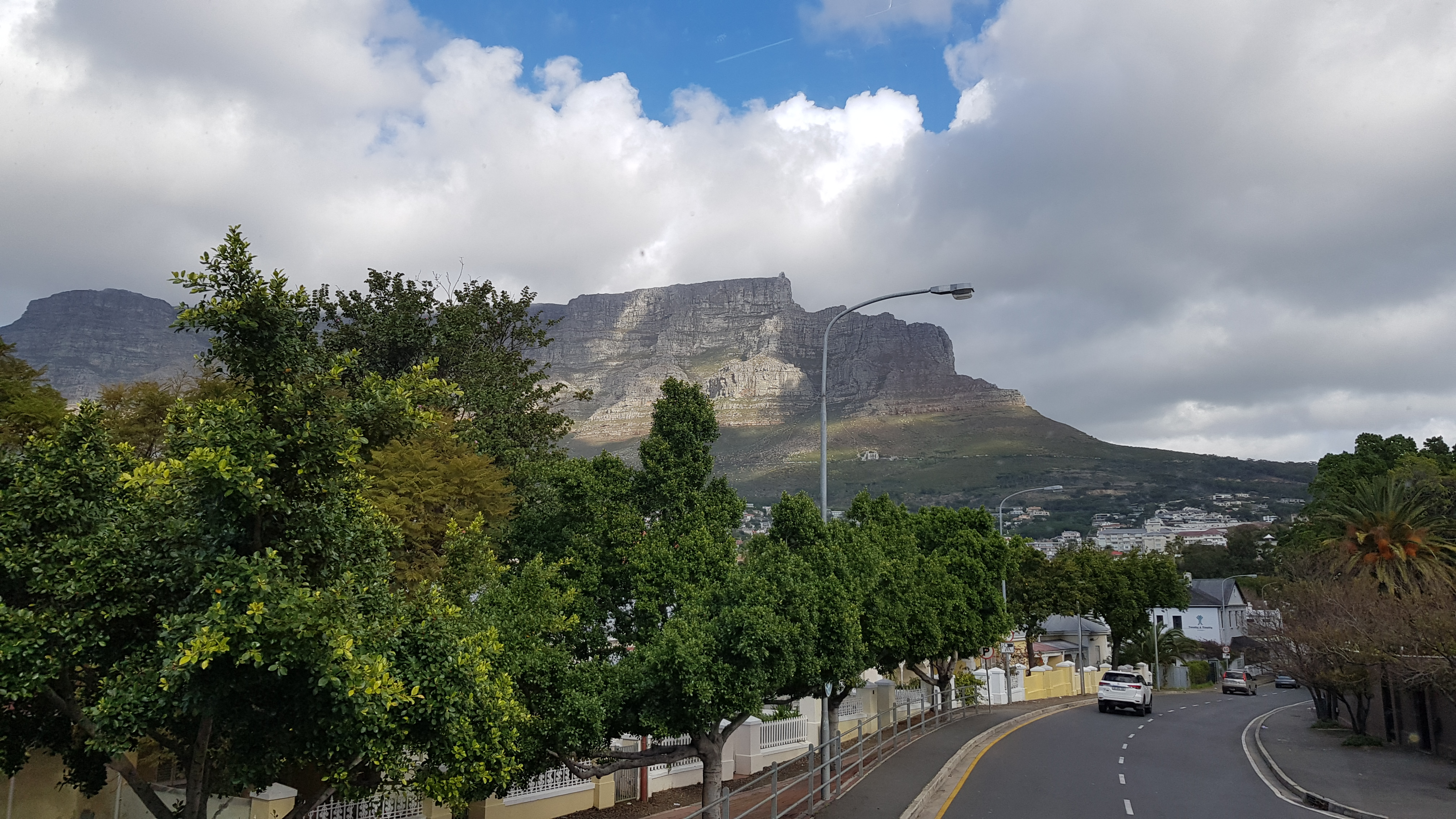
View of Table mountain from Kloof Nek Road

Kloof Nek Road is a paved passenger vehicle road in Cape Town that runs from Cape Town CBD (the city's economic center) to Camps Bay (a suburb in the Atlantic Seaboard region), between Table Mountain and Lion's Head.

One of South Africa's oldest roads, it was built in 1848 as an access road for the suburban pass with the same name, which was used primarily as a look-out post for soldiers, and a supply route to Camps Bay.

The route starts at Kloof Street on the edge of the City Bowl and turns into Camps Bay Road at the end of a mountain pass that runs between Table Mountain and Lion's Head. Despite being only two kilometers long, it is very steep, with an average gradient of 1:11.

The summit of Kloof Nek Road is a small but complicated intersection that's not clearly visible on approach and often catches motorists unaware. The road's steepness may be a contributor to the regular occurrence of often-fatal accidents on Kloof Nek Road.

== Attractions, entertainment and activities along Kloof Nek Road ==
=== Table Mountain National Park ===
- Turn into Tafelberg Road, the Table Mountain Aerial Cableway access road, from Kloof Nek Road when coming from the city bowl.
- Several mountain hiking trails can be accessed from Tafelberg Road, just off Kloof Nek Road, where free parking can also be found.

=== Restaurants and Night Life ===
- Rafiki's
- Hallelujah
- Beleza
- Kyoto Garden Sushi
- The Power and the Glory
- Maharajah
- The Sorrows
- The Black Ram

=== Popular Attractions ===
- Torino Chocolate House
- Christopher Moller Art Gallery
- Dinkel Bakery

=== Accommodation ===
- Kloof Nek Suites
- 129 On Koof Nek

=== Transport ===
- Every 1–5 minutes, buses run from the city center to Camps Bay. There are several stops in Kloof Nek Road as well as a stop close to the entrance of Tafelberg Road for visitors to the Table Mountain Aerial Cableway.
- The MyCiTi Bus service runs a free shuttle from the parking area in Tafelberg Road to the Cableway boarding station in order to avoid congestion.

== See also ==
- Cape Town
- Table Mountain
- Lion's Head
- Table Mountain National Park
- Table Mountain Aerial Cableway
