= Bergvliet High School =

Public high school in Cape Town, South Africa

Location
- Cape Town, South Africa; 34.041485°S 18.452643°E

Information
- Type: Public high school
- Motto: Sapiens Dominabitur Astris; The wise man will rule the stars.
- Established: 1957; 69 years ago
- Principal: Patricia Demas
- Enrollment: Approx. 1,130
- Colour: Blue
- Website: bhs.org.za

Bergvliet High School is a public high school in the suburb of Bergvliet, in the Southern Suburbs region of Cape Town, South Africa.

== Background ==
Bergvliet High currently has a student body of approximately 1130 learners. On the 20th of August 2009, it was announced that Stephen Price had been selected to become the new principal of the school. BHS has 2 deputy principals. The school motto is Sapiens Dominabitur Astris.

== History ==
The school was founded in 1957 soon after the relatively new suburb of Bergvliet was built. The first grade eight class was enrolled in 1957, with the first class starting on January 29 of that year. Approximately 70 students attended the first day. The first school principal was Mr. P.A.M van der Spuy, who served from the founding of the school until his retirement in 1969.

== See also ==
- BHS - The first 50 Years: Anecdotes, Tributes and Memories - Richard Hamburger
