= Kloof Street Public Library =

Public library in Kloof Street in Cape Town, South Africa

- 33.9349°S 18.4065°E
- Location: 122b Kloof Street, Tamboerskloof, 8001
- Branch of: City of Cape Town Library and Information Services

Kloof Street Public Library is a public library located in Cape Town, South Africa. The library was opened on 6 February 1956. It is one of the 102 library and information points, in the city.

The library was extended in 1967 when the adjoining shop became the children's library. The library offers internet access, computers and copying machine resources.

== Collections ==
Until 2023 (when the Western Cape was not affected by budget cuts) the library offered periodicals, newspapers, and audiovisual materials. However, in 2024 due to rationalizations, patrons no longer have access to paper-based newspapers and magazines.

Digital resources include e-books, audiobooks, online databases, and access to Overdrive, both in the library and remotely.

== Library Hours ==
| Day | Opening Hours |
|---|---|
| Monday | CLOSED |
| Tuesday | 10:00 – 17:00 |
| Wednesday | CLOSED |
| Thursday | 10:00 – 17:00 |
| Friday | CLOSED |
| Saturday | 10:00 – 13:00 |

Patrons are advised to visit the Vredehoek Library, if Kloof Street Public Library is closed.
