= Southern Peninsula, Cape Town =

Region of Cape Town, South Africa

The Southern Peninsula
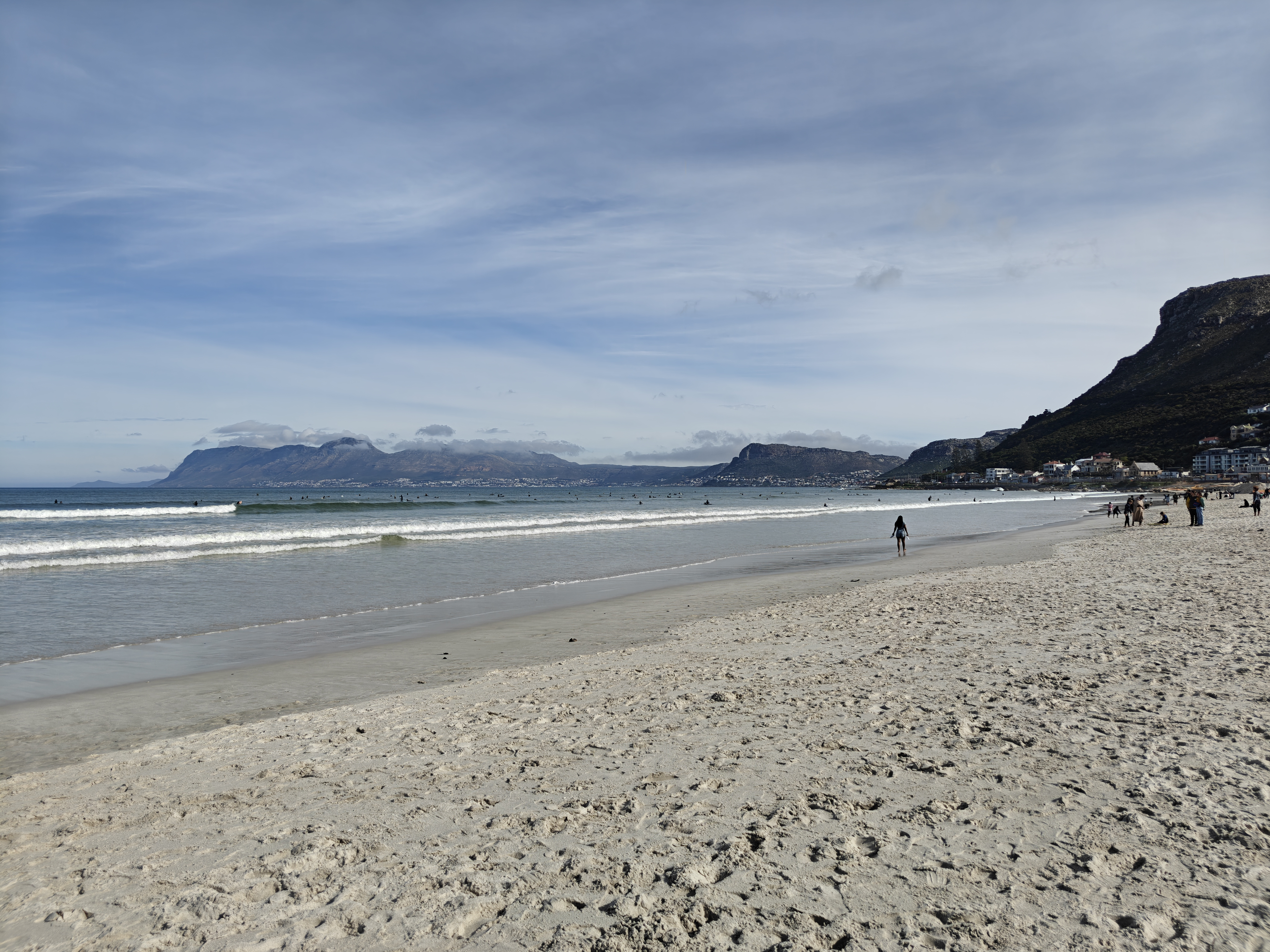
- View towards Fish Hoek and Simon's Town from Muizenberg Beach
- Interactive map of The Southern Peninsula
- Coordinates: 34°11′36.84″S 18°21′39.967″E
- Country: South Africa
- Province: Western Cape
- Municipality: City of Cape Town
- City: Cape Town

Area
  - Total: 111.58 km^{2} (43.08 sq mi)

Population (2011 census)
  - Total: 130,642
  - Density: 1,170.8/km^{2} (3,032.5/sq mi)

The Southern Peninsula is a region and collection of suburbs in Cape Town, South Africa. One of eight metro planning regions, it comprises a total of 18 neighborhoods. It begins at the borders of the Atlantic Seaboard and Southern Suburbs, and ends down at the Cape of Good Hope.

== Geography ==
The Southern Peninsula metro planning area is a collection of suburbs that together form part of the Cape Peninsula, a peninsula that extends out into the Atlantic Ocean. The Southern Peninsula spans from Muizenberg to the east, around False Bay, down through Simon's Town, to Cape Point.

It also encompasses neighborhoods up along more of the Atlantic Ocean, to the west, through Scarborough, Kommetjie, and Hout Bay, ending up at Llandudno.

The vast majority of the land in the Southern Peninsula is part of Table Mountain National Park. Included in this parkland is the Silvermine Nature Reserve.

== Suburbs ==
Most of the Southern Peninsula is uninhabited, with its suburbs being located along the coasts and in valleys, due to the region's mountainous geography, and the large amount of parkland within it.

The suburbs that comprise the Southern Peninsula are as follows:

- Capri Village
- Clovelly
- Da Gama Park
- Fish Hoek
- Glencairn
- Hout Bay
- Imizamo Yethu
- Kalk Bay
- Kommetjie
- Lakeside
- Masiphumelele
- Noordhoek
- Ocean View
- Scarborough
- Simon's Town
- St James
- Sunnydale
- Sun Valley

== Housing ==
The Southern Peninsula has a mix of detached homes, townhouses, and condos, with the prevalence of these varying by suburb. Average house prices also vary greatly between suburbs, with Kommetjie and Sun Valley on the cheaper end, and Kalk Bay and Scarborough on the more expensive end.

== Transit ==
The region features the M4 along its eastern side. The road, which travels through Kalk Bay, is one of four main routes into the Southern Peninsula, with the others being Boyes Drive, Ou Kaapse Weg, and the M6.

The M65 begins in the National Park area behind Simon's Town, and curves round through Kommetjie and through numerous suburbs in the area's valley, eventually ending up in Fish Hoek.

Between Noordhoek and Hout Bay, along the western side of the Peninsula, is Chapman's Peak Drive. This route is popular for its views across the bay, and features numerous places to pull over.

The M6 begins around halfway up Hout Bay, and continues up through Llandudno, following which it enters the Atlantic Seaboard.

The Southern Peninsula does not contain any freeways, with the nearest one - the M3 - ending in the Southern Suburbs, near to where the Southern Peninsula begins.

== See also ==
- List of Cape Town suburbs
- Cape Peninsula
