= Fish Hoek Valley =

Coordinates: 34°7′30″S 18°23′45″E

The Fish Hoek Valley is situated in the Cape Peninsula, eighteen miles south of Cape Town, South Africa. It takes its name from the town of Fish Hoek on the False Bay coast.

The valley is bound by mountains (including Chapman's Peak, Spitskop, Silvermine Mountain, and Ridge Peak) on the north; Fish Hoek Bay and False Bay on the east; mountains (including Elsie's Peak, Rooikrans, and Slangkop) on the south; and Chapman's Bay and the Atlantic Ocean on the west. It is 13 kilometres from west to east, and between 3 and 6 kilometres from north to south. The valley has several rivers and lakes.

The predominant vegetation type in this valley is endangered Hangklip Sand Fynbos. However, the sides of the valley are home to Cape Granite Fynbos, and Peninsula Sandstone Fynbos can be found higher up on the surrounding mountains. The latter two vegetation types (also both endangered) are endemic to the Cape Peninsula and can be found nowhere else in the world.

Fish Hoek Valley was once rural, but today it is largely covered by suburbs and townships such as Kommetjie, Ocean View, Noordhoek, The Lakes, Masiphumelele, Capri Village, Sunnydale, Sun Valley, Fish Hoek, and Clovelly. Some rural aspects have been preserved in the form of heritage areas and parts of the Table Mountain National Park.

== History ==
Pre-historic

Many millennia ago, the valley was a channel separating two islands off the African mainland. By 20 000 years ago, the sea had receded, the channel and the isthmus separating the islands from the mainland had become dry land, and the islands had become a peninsula.

By 10 000 BCE, pre-Bushman people were living in caves in the slopes lining the valley. Several of their skeletons, weapons and other artefacts were unearthed in Peers Cave on the north-eastern side of the valley, in 1927. The skeletons were named 'Fish Hoek Man'.

By the first century AD 'Strandlopers' (Khoisan) were living on the slopes of Slangkop. A midden containing mussel, limpet and abalone shells, and various stone implements was uncovered there in 1972.

17th century

The recorded history of the valley, and of South Africa as a whole, begins when the Dutch East India Company established a settlement at Table Bay, 28 kilometres north of the valley, in 1652. The Company regarded the whole of the Western Cape region as being under its jurisdiction, but in the early years its settlement remained confined to the northern peninsula. Its first venture into the southern peninsula is thought to have been in 1659, when troops combed the area in search of KhoiSan who had attacked the Company's settlement.

In the early 1680s, the Company explored the mountains on the northern side of the valley for silver deposits. The mountain, and a river which flows down it, became known as 'Zilvermyn'. In 1687, Governor Simon van der Stel explored the area, and reported an abundance of wild birds and wild game roaming the area. Three years later, Van der Stel granted fishing and whaling rights at Visch Hoek on the eastern end of the valley — a community of fishermen and whalers developed there, and a building was erected.

18th century

Permanent settlement of the valley began in 1743, when the Company established Simon's Bay, 3 kilometres south of Visch Hoek bay, as a winter anchorage. Governor-general Gustav van Imhoff granted three farms at the western end of the valley, probably to supply fresh produce to Simon's Bay. They were Slangkop ('Snake Peak'), De Goede Hoop ('Good Hope'), and Poespaskraal ('Hotch-potch kraal'). Half a century later, in 1797, when the colony was under British military occupation, a fourth farm was established, at Visch Hoek, but it was only on loan and the lease ended when the lessee died in 1808.

19th century

When the Cape became a permanent British colony in 1814, the Royal Navy established a permanent base at Simon's Town, and governor Sir John Cradock established the southern part of the Peninsula as the Simon's Town magisterial district. The road through Visch Hoek to Simon's Town was rebuilt in 1815.

Soon afterwards, two more farms were established, at the eastern end of the valley. In 1815, Governor Lord Charles Somerset granted a 112-hectare farm on the slopes of the Zilvermyn mountain - appropriately, the farm was named Zilvermyn. In 1818, Somerset granted the 1528-hectare Visch Hoek property as a farm, on condition that the owner was not allowed to sell liquor. When Visch Hoek was subdivided in 1827, the 454-hectare portion north of the Zilvermyn river became a separate farm named Klein Tuin ('small garden').

Later, a farm named Brakkloof (or Brakke Kloof) was granted between Visch Hoek and Poespaskraal.

Farm names were changed from time to time. Slangkop also became known as 'Imhoff's Gift', De Goede Hoop as 'Noordhoek', and Poespaskraal as 'Sunnydale'.

In 1855, a divisional council (comparable to a county council in England) was established to administer the Cape Division, i.e. the rural areas surrounding Cape Town. It administered the valley for the following 131 years, except during the years 1879 to 1888, when the Simon's Town magisterial district was a division with its own divisional council.

Another farm was created in the late 1850s, when Slangkop / Imhoff's Gift was subdivided and the south-eastern portion became Ocean View.

By the end of the 19th century, the south peninsula was well established. The railway line was extended from the seaside town of Kalk Bay through Visch Hoek to Simon's Town in 1890. When Kalk Bay was proclaimed a municipality in 1895, the farm Klein Tuin was included within its boundaries.

20th century

Like the rest of the colony, the Simon's Town district was under martial law during 1901 and 1902, because of the Anglo-Boer War, the invasion of the British of the Boer countries to the North. The Transvaal and Free State.

The first townships were established in the valley towards the end of the war. Kommetje Estates Ltd bought Slangkop farm in 1900 and established a seaside village named Kommetje. At the other end of the valley, G.W. MacIntyre bought Klein Tuin in 1902, renamed it 'Mayville', and established a small seaside suburb (which was later renamed 'Clovelly').

Parliament approved the construction of a branch railway line from Visch Hoek to Kommetje, but it was never built. Eventually, ten years later, in 1913, the divisional council built Kommetje Road (now route M65), leading from Visch Hoek across the southern side of the valley, to Kommetje.

The Kalk Bay municipality, including Mayville (Clovelly), was incorporated into the City of Cape Town in 1913, but the rest of the valley remained under the divisional council.

During World War I, the Simon's Town district was under martial law to protect the naval base, and travel through the valley was hampered by military roadblocks. The German navy cruiser Möwe was seen in Chapman's Bay, off Slangkop, in 1916.

Two more townships were developed after the war. Visch Hoek (or 'Fish Hoek') farm was subdivided into a township in 1918, and grew rapidly. A local board was established in 1921, and a village management board in 1927. The prohibition against the sale of liquor imposed a century earlier still held good, and the town became well known for being the only 'dry' town in the country.

Part of Noordhoek was subdivided for residential development in 1920. Access to the western end of the valley was improved when the divisional council opened Chapman's Peak Drive (now part of route M6) in 1922, as part of a scenic motor route around the Peninsula.

Cape Estates Ltd bought the undeveloped part of Mayville in 1922, and established the Clovelly Country Club.

Fish Hoek was proclaimed a municipality in 1940.

German submarines were active in Cape waters during World War II. A military radar station was established on Slangkop, to monitor the ocean, and a small military camp named 'Cobra' was opened to house the personnel. Two German anti-ship mines washed up at Kommetjie — the navy dismantled one and detonated the other.

After the war, most of Sunnydale farm was subdivided into a residential township.

The divisional council undertook considerable development in the valley during the 1960s and 1970s. In the 1960s, it developed a White residential township, named Sun Valley, on Brakkloof farm., and a Coloured township on Ocean View farm, to accommodate the communities which the government had forced to move out of Fish Hoek, Sunnydale, and Simon's Town under its apartheid system. In 1968, the council opened the 'Ou Kaapse Weg' ('Old Cape Road') (now route M64), leading from Sunnydale over the Silvermine mountain to Tokai.

In the 1970s, the council opened Soetwater caravan park (for Coloured holidaymakers), and Imhoff caravan park (for Whites) near Kommetjie. Wildevoëlvlei sewage works were opened in 1977

Part of Sunnydale was developed into a residential township named Capri Village.

The divisional council was absorbed into the Western Cape Regional Services Council in 1986.

In 1986, the Black residents of Dassenberg were forcibly evicted under the apartheid laws and re-settled at Khayalitsha. They were allowed to return to the valley in 1989, and a new settlement was established for them on part of Sunnydale — it was later named Masiphumelele ('we will succeed'). Apartheid ended in 1994.

In 1996, the valley was incorporated into the new South Peninsula Municipality, and Fish Hoek's municipality was dissolved. Four years later, the South Peninsula Municipality was incorporated into the City of Cape Town, which now administers the valley.

== Some notable events ==
1725 : A pirate ship anchored in Visch Hoek bay — Dutch East India Company troops were sent to the valley to prevent the pirates scouring the countryside for food and drink.

1795 : British military forces invaded the colony. They marched from Simon's Town along the road past Visch Hoek beach, and overran a Dutch East India Company artillery emplacement at the northern corner of the valley — the abandoned guns are now displayed at the Clovelly Country Club.

1821 : The brig Waterloo was wrecked off Visch Hoek beach.

1860] : The valley welcomed its (and the colony's) first royal visitor, when Prince Alfred travelled through the valley en route from Simon's Town to Cape Town.

1885 : A huge octopus with a 3-metre-long body and 8-metre-long tentacles, washed up on Noordhoek beach.

1900 : The steamship SS Kakapo was wrecked off Noordhoek beach. Some of the metal plates were later used as a barricade to protect the railway line, others were removed during World War II to be recycled into armaments.

1908 : The valley's first school was opened, at Kommetjie.

1910 : A wireless station was established on the seaward slopes of Slangkop — it was later moved to Kommetje, because of interference from manganese deposits in the mountain.

1914 : A lighthouse was built on the mountain, but because of the outbreak of World War I, it was not put into commission until 1919.

1927 : Victor and Bertie Peers unearthed the remains of 'Fish Hoek Man' in a cave above Fish Hoek. The cave was proclaimed a national monument in 1941.

1928 : More than 100 False Killer whales beached themselves at Kommetjie — few could be saved.

1930 : Motor racing began on the Noordhoek salt pan — it continued until 1939.

1934 : A whale shark washed up on Kommetjie beach.

1936 : A devastating mountain fire on the Brakkloof mountain threatened Fish Hoek.

1963 : The provincial administration opened the valley's first hospital - the False Bay Hospital in Fish Hoek.

1969 : Part of the film Ryan's Daughter was filmed around the remains of the Kakapo on Noordhoek beach.

1970 : The first annual Two Oceans Marathon was run — the route passes through the valley.

1972 : A 2000-year-old midden containing mussel, limpet and abalone shells, and various stone implements was uncovered at Kommetjie in 1972.

2000 : Devastating mountain fires ravaged the southern Peninsula for several days in — parts of Noordhoek and Kommetjie were evacuated until the fire services and air force had extinguished the blazes.

2008 : Xenophobic riots displaced many Ocean View and Masiphumelele residents — they had to be housed in camps at Soetwater.

2009 : 55 False Killer whales beached themselves at Kommetjie — only a few could be saved and returned to the sea.

2010: A rhinodon typicus shark - one of the rarest in the world - washed up on Cape Point Reserve.

2013 : 19 pilot whales beached themselves at Noordhoek — only one could be saved and returned to the sea.

== See also ==
- Southern Peninsula, Cape Town
