= De Oude Weg =

Suburb of Cape Town, South Africa

- Location within Western Cape Location within South Africa
- Coordinates: 34°08′13.3″S 18°22′31.2″E
- Country: South Africa
- Province: Western Cape
- Municipality: City of Cape Town
- Main Place: Noordhoek

Area
  - Total: 1 km^{2} (0.39 sq mi)
- Time zone: UTC+2 (SAST)
- Postal code (street): 7975

De Oude Weg is a small residential area of Cape Town on the Cape Peninsula, South Africa, situated between Kommetjie, Fish Hoek and Capri Village. It is in the suburb of Sunnydale and is situated midway between Kommetjie and Fish Hoek. Translated from Dutch, "de oude weg" means "the old road" which refers to the old dirt wagon track which, in bye gone days, passed through there.

The residential area is part of Sunnydale’s first land grant to Carel George Wieser in 1743. Some of the roads in de Oude Weg are named after subsequent landowners. The de Stadler family, who did mixed farming, had ownership as early as 1864. Thereafter, three sisters namely Thelma Wood, Leonora Triggs and Olga Lock (all nee de Stadler) had ownership of the land until they sold to a poultry farmer (Hillside Poultry Farm), individual landowners and finally developers. The Booysen family have strong ties to the area, as they worked the land for many generations.

Some of the properties have views of the Noordhoek Valley. It is located close to The Kommetjie Road Fire Station.
