= Clovelly, Cape Town =

Clovelly
- Location within Western Cape Location within South Africa
- Coordinates: 34°7′S 18°26′E
- Country: South Africa
- Province: Western Cape
- Municipality: City of Cape Town
- Main Place: Fish Hoek

Area
  - Total: 4.15 km^{2} (1.60 sq mi)

Population (2011)
  - Total: 559
  - Density: 135/km^{2} (349/sq mi)

Racial makeup (2011)
  - Black African: 4.8%
  - Coloured: 4.8%
  - Indian/Asian: 0.4%
  - White: 87.5%
  - Other: 2.5%

First languages (2011)
  - English: 91.0%
  - Afrikaans: 6.1%
  - Other: 2.9%
- Time zone: UTC+2 (SAST)
- Postal code (street): 7975
- Area code: 021

Clovelly is a small, coastal suburb in the Southern Peninsula region of Cape Town, South Africa.

== Geography ==
Clovelly is situated on the False Bay coast, up against the Muizenberg Mountains. The vast majority of the suburb consists of mountainous area. To the south is the small Clovelly Beach, and to the west is a collection of residential homes, as well as the Clovelly Country Club.

To the suburb's southwest is Fish Hoek, and to its southeast is Kalk Bay.

== Transit ==
Clovelly is accessed primarily via the M4 (Main Road) to its south, which connects the neighborhood to Fish Hoek (with Simon's Town further west), and Kalk Bay (with Muizenberg further east).

Via neighboring Fish Hoek, Clovelly can also be accessed via the M64 (Kommetjie Road), which connects it to the M64 (Ou Kaapse Weg) and eventually the Southern Suburbs.

== Biodiversity ==
In biology, Clovelly is home to several seaweeds found only around the Cape Peninsula, including Chaetomorpha, Cladophora, and Laurenciophila minima.

== Housing ==
Housing in Clovelly comprises mostly detached homes. As of August 2026, the average price of a detached house in the suburb was R8.58 million, firmly within Cape Town's luxury housing market.

== Amenities ==
Clovelly has its own beach, and is also close to other beaches, including the far larger Muizenberg Beach. It is also close to the many cafes and stores along Main Road in Kalk Bay.

The suburb is home to Clovelly Country Club. Established in 1932, it is one of the oldest golf clubs in South Africa.

Nearby malls include Longbeach Mall and Sun Valley Mall in Noordhoek, as well as Harbour Bay Mall at the start of Simon's Town.

== Demographics ==
In the 2011 Census, 51% of Clovelly residents were male, and 49% female. The largest age group was 60 through 64 years. A total of 91% of the suburb's residents spoke English as a first language, followed by Afrikaans at 6%.
