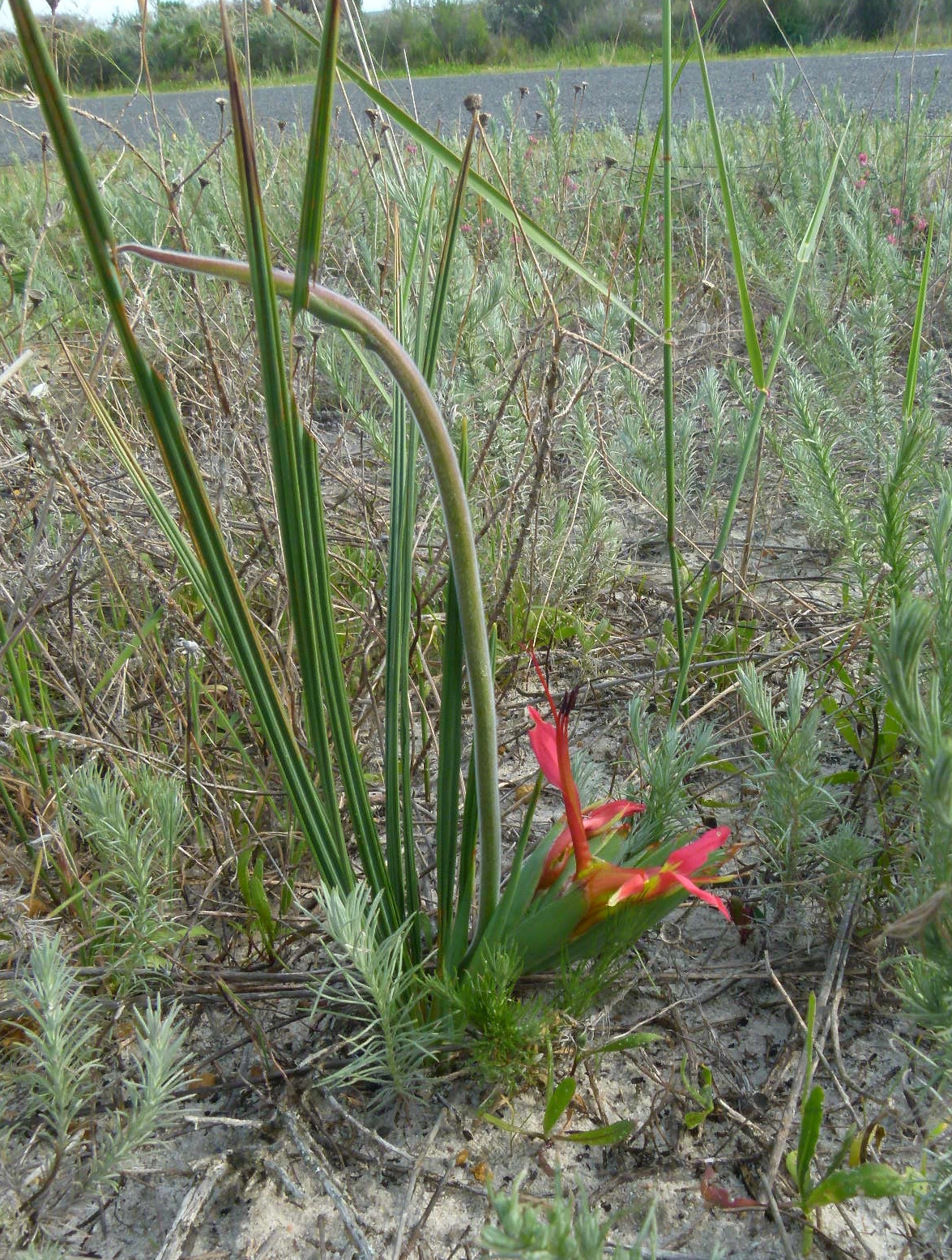

Scientific classification
- Kingdom: Plantae
- Clade: Tracheophytes
- Clade: Angiosperms
- Clade: Monocots
- Order: Asparagales
- Family: Iridaceae
- Genus: Babiana
- Species: B. ringens

Binomial name
- Babiana ringens (L.) Ker Gawl.

= Babiana ringens =

Species of flowering plant

Babiana ringens, the rat's tail, is a flowering plant endemic to Cape Province of South Africa. The foliage is long and erect with an inflorescence consisting of a sterile main stalk adapted for ornithophily, pollination by birds. The plant bears bright red, tubular flowers on side branches close to the ground. It is a perennial that grows in nutrient-poor sandy soil and flowers during the winter rains.

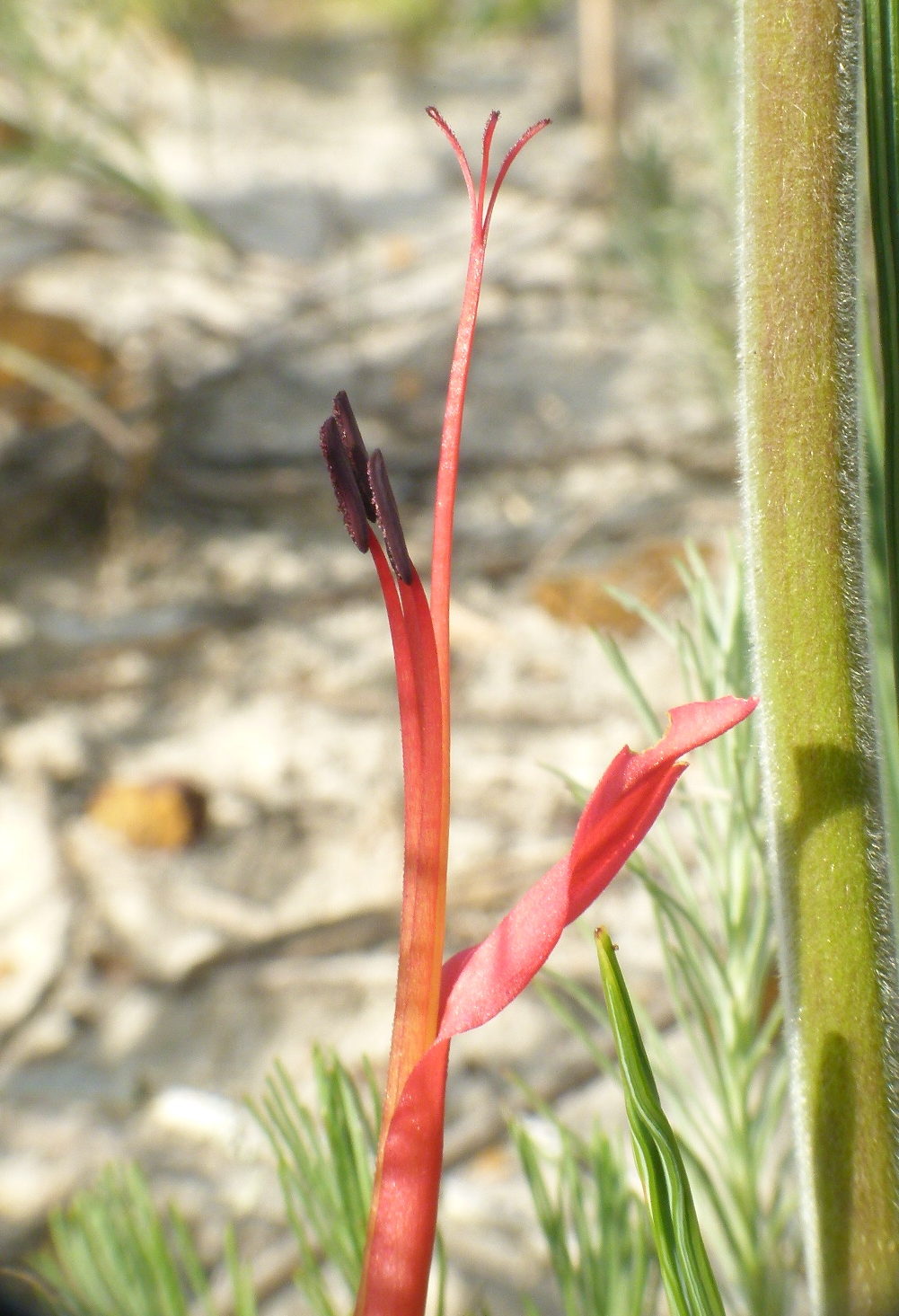
Close view of the anthers with the stalk beside it.

The main stalk acts as a perch for birds, enabling birds to land within reach of the plant's flowers. The adaptation of the stalk was first noticed by Rudolf Marloth The bird that is the main pollinator of the plant is the malachite sunbird (Nectarinia famosa). The male sunbird is twice as likely to perch on the stalk as the female and, on average, spends four times longer on a perch. The stalk does seem to play a role in pollination as plants without a stalk produced only half as many seeds and see less cross-pollination as plants with a stalk intact. Accessing the flower from the stalk results in pollen being dusted on the breast of the sunbirds, although the birds may also sit on the ground to access flowers that lack stalks. It has been suggested that the evolution of the bare axis and the flowers being borne at the base may have been driven by selection through the action of grazing herbivores.

== Subspecies ==
Two subspecies are recorded. The nominate ringens is found north of the Fish Hoek gap while australis is found further south with the northernmost record from Scarborough.

1. Babiana ringens subsp. australis Goldblatt & J.C.Manning
2. Babiana ringens subsp. ringens
