= M6 (Cape Town) =

South African metropolitan route

Metropolitan route M6

Route information
- Maintained by City of Cape Town and Western Cape Department of Transport and Public Works
- Length: 42.5 km (26.4 mi)

Major junctions
- North end: M62 in Cape Town CBD

- M61 in Sea Point M62 in Camps Bay M63 in Hout Bay M64 in Noordhoek M65 in Noordhoek
- South end: M4 in Glencairn

Location
- Country: South Africa

Highway system
- Numbered routes of South Africa
← M5	→ M7

The M6 is a long metropolitan route in Cape Town, South Africa. It connects the Cape Town CBD with Glencairn on the False Bay coast via Sea Point, Camps Bay and Hout Bay. It is an alternative route to the M4 for travel between Cape Town CBD and Glencairn, with the M6 passing west of Table Mountain and through Chapman's Peak.

== Route ==
The M6 begins at a junction with the M62 (Buitengracht Street) in the Cape Town CBD, at the location of the Foreshore Freeway Bridge. It begins by heading west-north-west as Helen Suzman Boulevard into Green Point, bypassing the Victoria & Alfred Waterfront and the Cape Town Stadium. Immediately after Green Point, the M6 reaches the West Coast (Atlantic) and turns southwards as Beach Road to follow the coast, passing through Sea Point and bypassing Table Mountain and its National Park to the west.

In the southern part of Sea Point, at a roundabout, the M6 turns east to become Queens Road. It meets the M61 at a roundabout before returning to facing southwards as Victoria Road to resume following the coast. It heads south, through Clifton, to enter Camps Bay, where it meets the M62 again.

From Camps Bay, the M6 heads southwards for 10 kilometres to reach Hout Bay, where it turns east as Victoria Road and then south as Main Road, where it meets the M63. It resumes southwards, becoming Chapmans Peak Drive, to pass through the Chapman's Peak Hiking & Marine Trail, where a tollgate is situated.

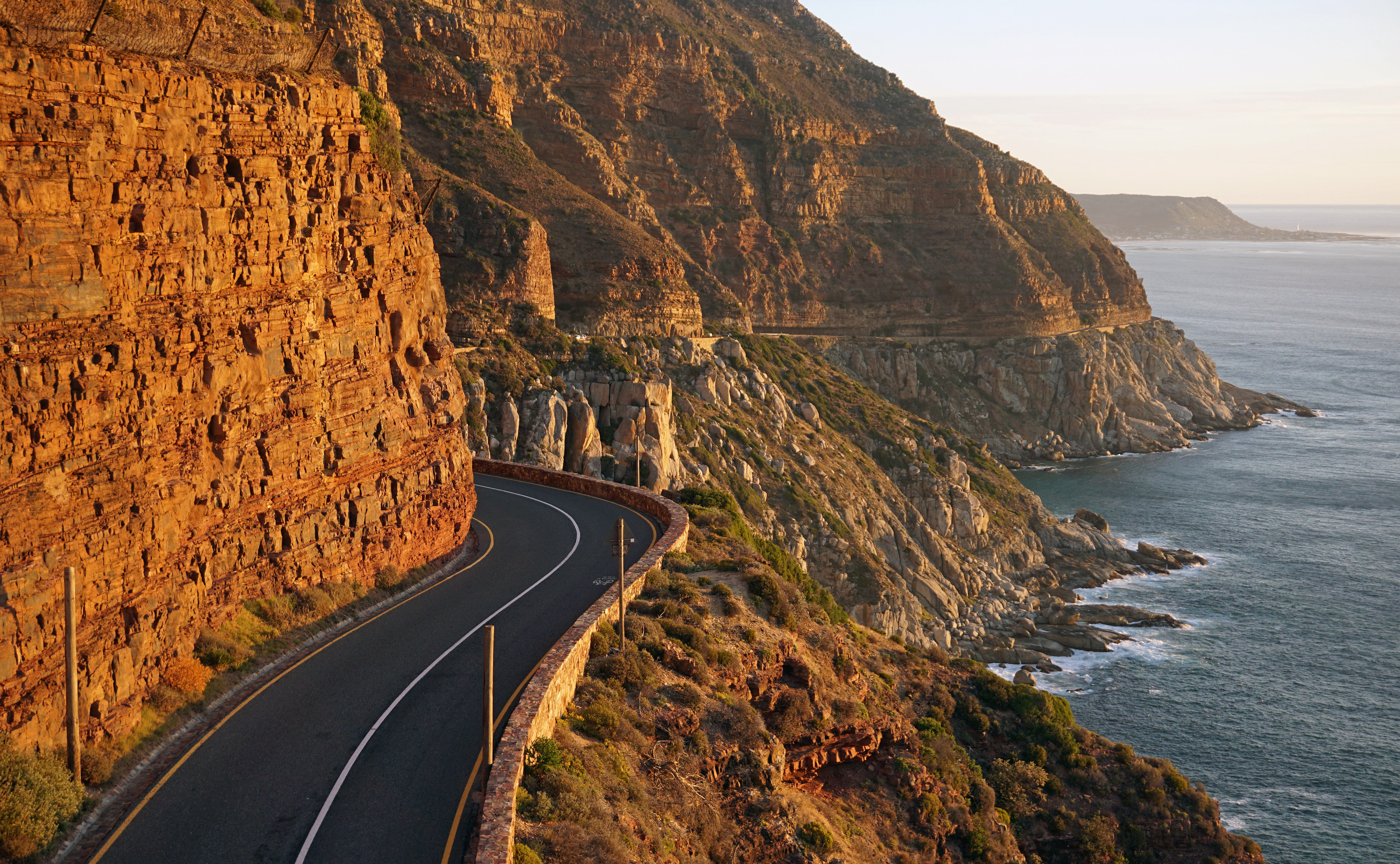
Chapmans Peak Drive

From the tollgate, the M6 heads southwards to Noordhoek, where it turns to the south-south-east as Noordhoek Main Road. It reaches Sun Valley, where it meets the south-western terminus of the M64 (Ou Kaapse Weg). It then meets the M65 (Kommetjie Road) and turns to the south-east as Glencairn Expressway. It enters Glencairn, where it ends at a junction with the M4 (Main Road).
