= Ou Kaapse Weg =

Mountain pass in the Cape Peninsula between the Southern Suburbs and Fish Hoek Valley

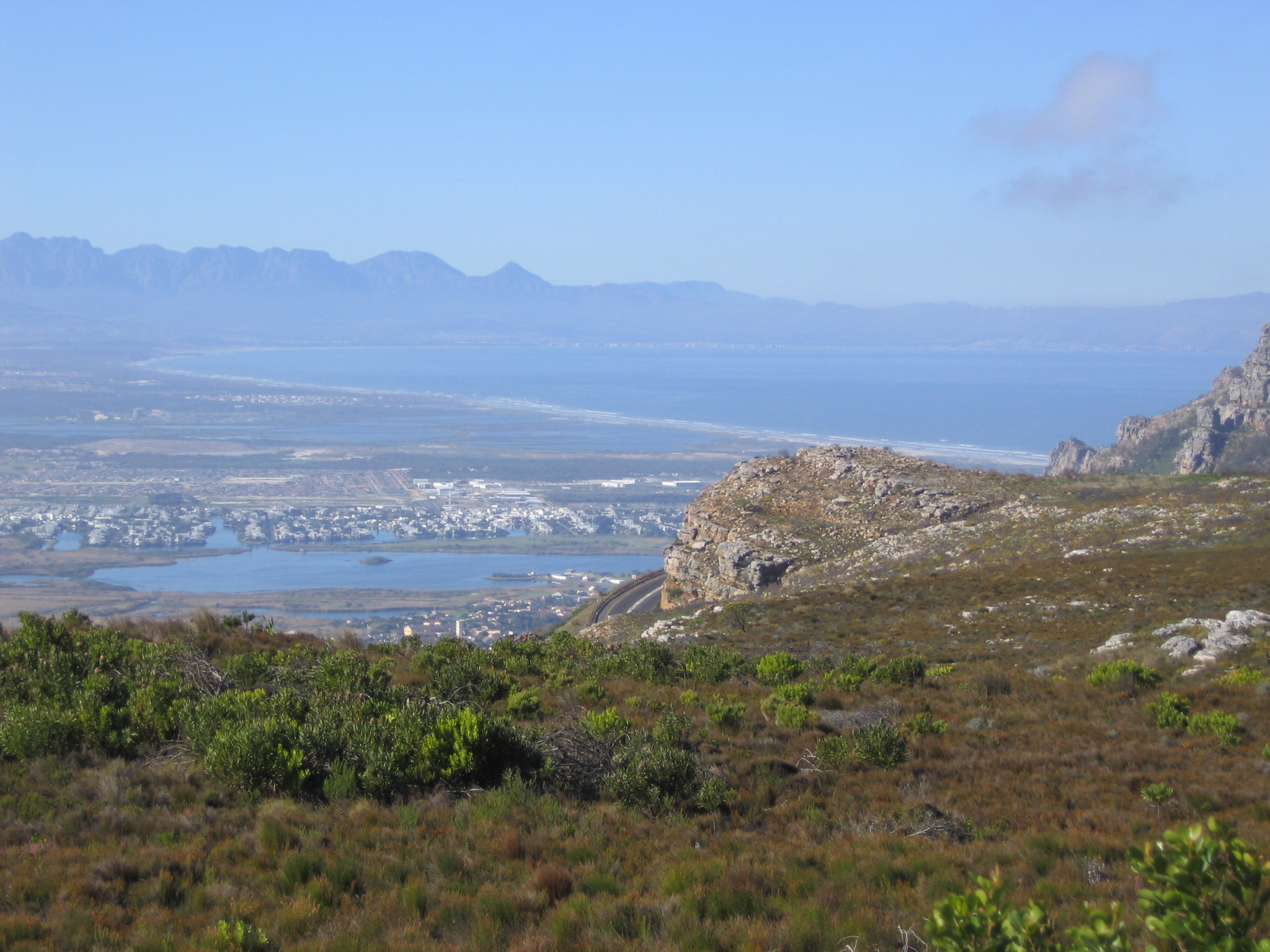
- View from the top of the pass towards False Bay

- Location within Cape Town
- Elevation: 315 metres (1,033 ft)
- Traversed by: M64 road

Third Approach
- Location: Cape Peninsula, Western Cape, South Africa
- Range: Steenberg
- Coordinates: 34°05′15″S 18°25′17″E
- Topo map: 3418AB

Ou Kaapse Weg (Afrikaans for Old Cape Way), numbered as route M64, is a mountain pass in the Cape Peninsula that connects the Southern Suburbs of Cape Town with the Fish Hoek Valley. It traverses the Steenberg mountains and passes through the Silvermine Nature Reserve.

Ou Kaapse Weg is one of three routes to the Fish Hoek Valley: the others are Chapman's Peak Drive along the Atlantic coast and Main Road along the False Bay coast.

== History ==
Despite its name suggesting the road is considerably old, the pass was only constructed in 1968, by the Divisional Council of the Cape.

== Route ==
Ou Kaapse Weg begins at a T-junction with Steenberg Road in Westlake, close to the southern end of the M3 expressway. It rapidly ascends the northern face of the Steenberg mountains, through two hairpin bends, to the summit at an elevation of 315 metres (1,033 ft).

Near to the summit are entrance gates to the Silvermine Nature Reserve. The pass then descends along the valley of the Silvermine River, passing by Noordhoek to end in Sun Valley at a junction with Kommetjie Road (M6 road), which provides access to Kommetjie, Fish Hoek and other places in the Fish Hoek Valley.

In 2012, Ou Kaapse Weg suffered severe traffic congestion because it was used as an alternative route to avoid construction work on Main Road between Muizenberg and Fish Hoek.
