= Ocean View, Cape Town =

Ocean View Slangkop
- Location within Western Cape Location within South Africa
- Coordinates: 34°9′12″S 18°21′19″E
- Country: South Africa
- Province: Western Cape
- District: Southern Peninsula
- Municipality: City of Cape Town
- Main Place: Kommetjie

Area
  - Total: 1.75 km^{2} (0.68 sq mi)

Population (2011)
  - Total: 13,569
  - Density: 7,750/km^{2} (20,100/sq mi)

Racial makeup (2011)
  - Coloured: 91.4%
  - Black Africans: 6.8%
  - Indian/Asian: 0.6%
  - White: 0.3%
  - Other: 0.9%

First languages (2011)
  - Afrikaans: 57.2%
  - English: 39.1%
  - Other: 3.7%
- Time zone: UTC+2 (SAST)
- Postal code (street): 4052

Ocean View, Cape Town, was established between 1960 and 1970, as a township for coloured people who had been forcibly removed from the neighbouring so called "white areas", such as Simon's Town, Noordhoek, Fish Hoek, and Glencairn, by the apartheid government under the Group Areas Act of 1950. Originally called "Slangkop", the area was later renamed Ocean View by the unwilling residents who recalled their seized seaside residences.

Ocean View is located between the community of Kommetjie to the west, and Immhof's Gift and Masiphumelele to the east of the town

The residents of Ocean View make up a diverse and historical community, with many of the families tracing their roots back to the indentured labourers and slaves brought to the Cape by the Dutch in the early days of colonialism in the Cape.

== Notable people ==
- Peter Clarke, visual artist
- Emile Baron, international footballer, Bafana Bafana goalkeeper
- Franklin Cale, professional footballer, Bafana Bafana
