= Emile Baron =

South African footballer

Personal information
- Full name: Emile Raymond Baron
- Date of birth: 17 June 1979 (age 47)
- Place of birth: Ocean View, South Africa
- Height: 1.90 m (6 ft 3 in)
- Position: Goalkeeper

Youth career
- Fish Hoek

Senior career*
Years	Team	Apps	(Gls)
1996–1999	Hellenic	60	(0)
1999–2005	Lillestrøm	115	(0)
2005–2009	Kaizer Chiefs	19	(0)
2009–2011	Supersport United	21	(0)
2011–2013	Bidvest Wits	15	(0)

International career
1997–2000	South Africa U-23	30	(0)
2002–2010	South Africa	6	(0)
- * Club domestic league appearances and goals as of 15 December 2015

Emile Raymond Baron (born 17 June 1979) is a South African retired association football goalkeeper who played for South Africa.

== International career ==
Baron made his international debut in a friendly against Saudi Arabia on 20 March 2002. He was also a participant at the 2004 African Nations Cup. In April 2010, he got a shoulder injury which caused him to miss the 2010 FIFA World Cup. He finished his international career with six caps for his national team.
