= Capri Village =

Suburb of Cape Town, South Africa

- Location within Western Cape Location within South Africa
- Coordinates: 34°8′7″S 18°23′12″E
- Country: South Africa
- Province: Western Cape
- Municipality: City of Cape Town
- Main Place: Noordhoek

Area
  - Total: 4.54 km^{2} (1.75 sq mi)

Population (2011)
  - Total: 3,061
  - Density: 674/km^{2} (1,750/sq mi)

Racial makeup (2011)
  - Black African: 9.3%
  - Coloured: 5.7%
  - Indian/Asian: 1.9%
  - White: 81.3%
  - Other: 1.8%

First languages (2011)
  - English: 81.7%
  - Afrikaans: 11.4%
  - Other: 6.9%
- Time zone: UTC+2 (SAST)
- Postal code (street): 7975

Capri Village is a small suburb forming part of the greater area of Noordhoek on the Cape Peninsula, South Africa, situated between Kommetjie, De Oude Weg, Fish Hoek and Noordhoek.
