= Silvermine Nature Reserve =

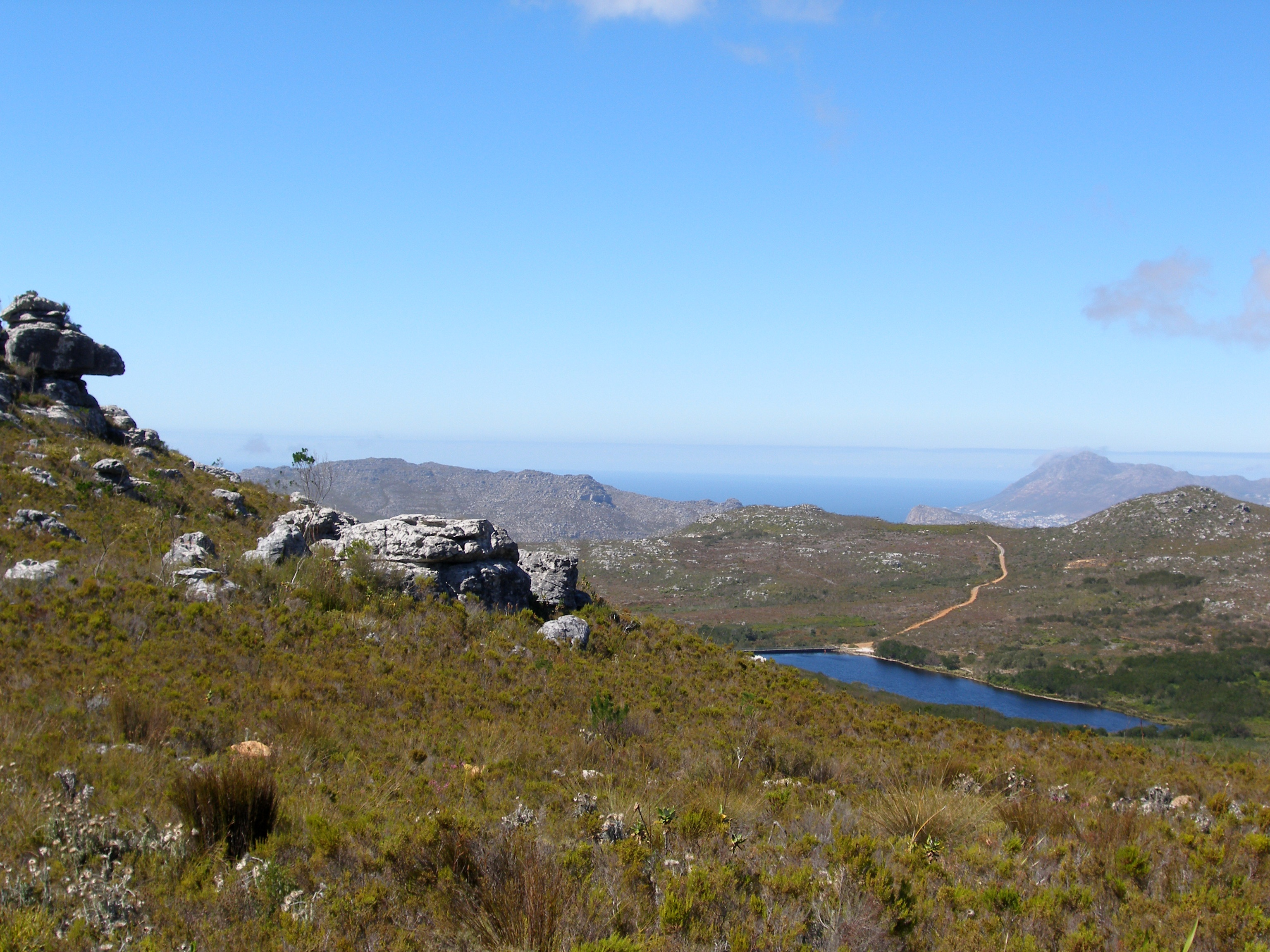
- Silvermine Nature Reserve with on the right hand side the Silvermine reservoir

- Location within South Africa
- Location: Cape Town, South Africa
- Coordinates: 34.074°S 18.395°E
- Area: 2,000 ha (4,900 acres)
- Created: 1965
- Website: Official website

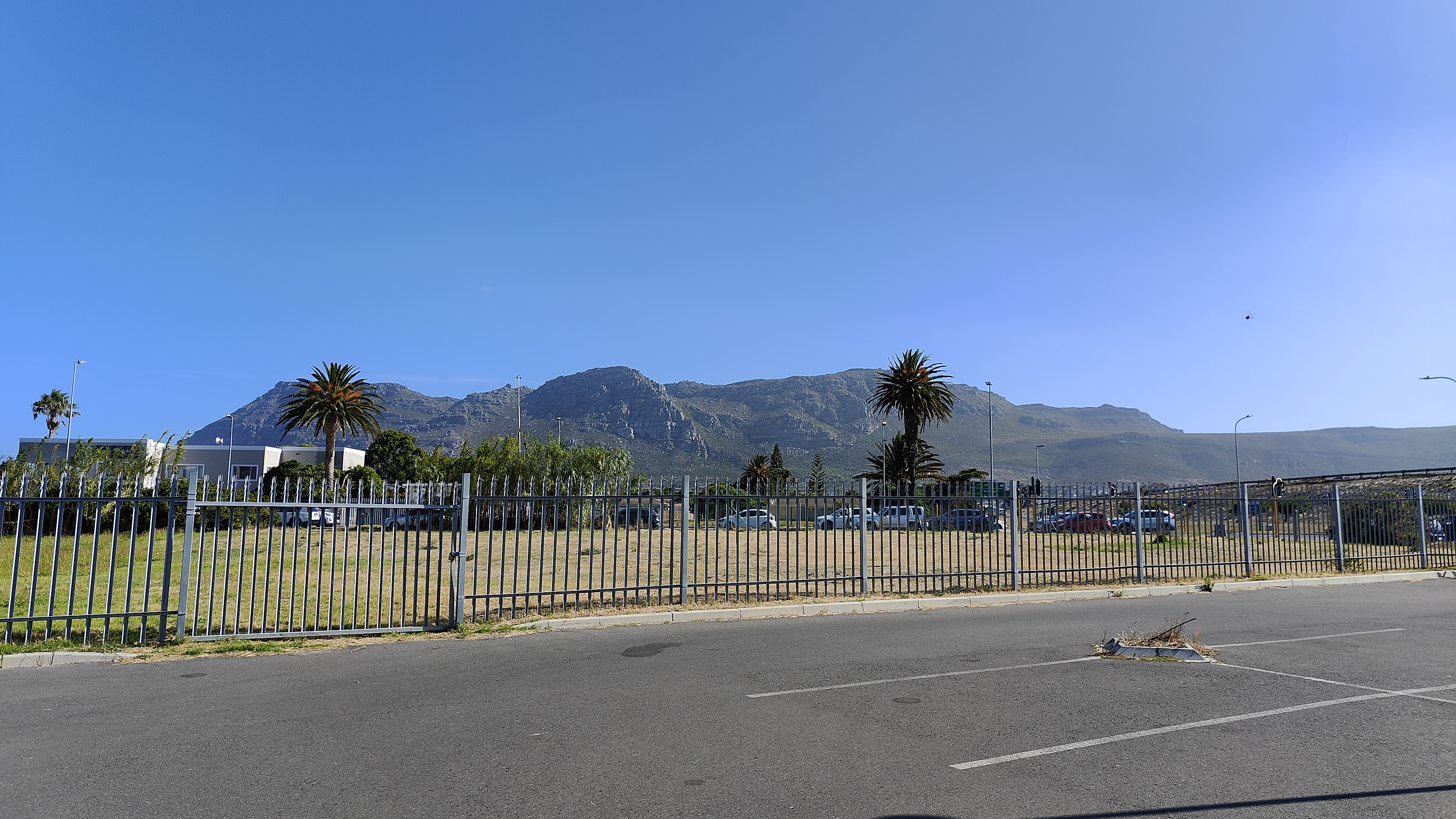
View of Silvermine Nature Reserve mountains from Tokai, Cape Town

Silvermine Nature Reserve forms part of the Table Mountain National Park in Cape Town, South Africa. It covers the section of the Cape Peninsula mountain range from the Kalk Bay mountains through to Constantiaberg. The area is a significant conservation area for the indigenous fynbos vegetation, which is of the montane cone-bush type at this location.

The Ou Kaapse Weg main road runs through the reserve, cutting it into a northern and southern section. The Silvermine reservoir, on the north side, was built in 1898 to supply water to Cape Town.

Until 2000, there were significant pine stands in the reserve, but the last of these were felled in following the major fire in that year. The area was again burnt in March 2015 and the reserve was closed for the rest of the year.

The area is popular for walking, hiking, picnicking, and mountain biking. There are a number of sandstone cave systems in the reserve and there are rock climbing routes on Muizenberg Peak.

The Silvermine River (Western Cape), which starts in the reserve and runs to Clovelly, is the only river in the Cape Peninsula that runs its whole course without going through a developed area.

On 8 March 1973, Prime Minister B.J. Vorster officially opened the South African Navy's R15m Maritime Operational and Communications Headquarters at Silvermine, West Lake, near Simonstown, Cape Peninsula. The South African Navy's Maritime Rescue Co-ordination Centre is in an underground bunker on the lower slopes of the Silvermine mountain.
