= Glencairn, Cape Town =

Seaside suburb of Cape Town in Western Cape, South Africa

Glencairn
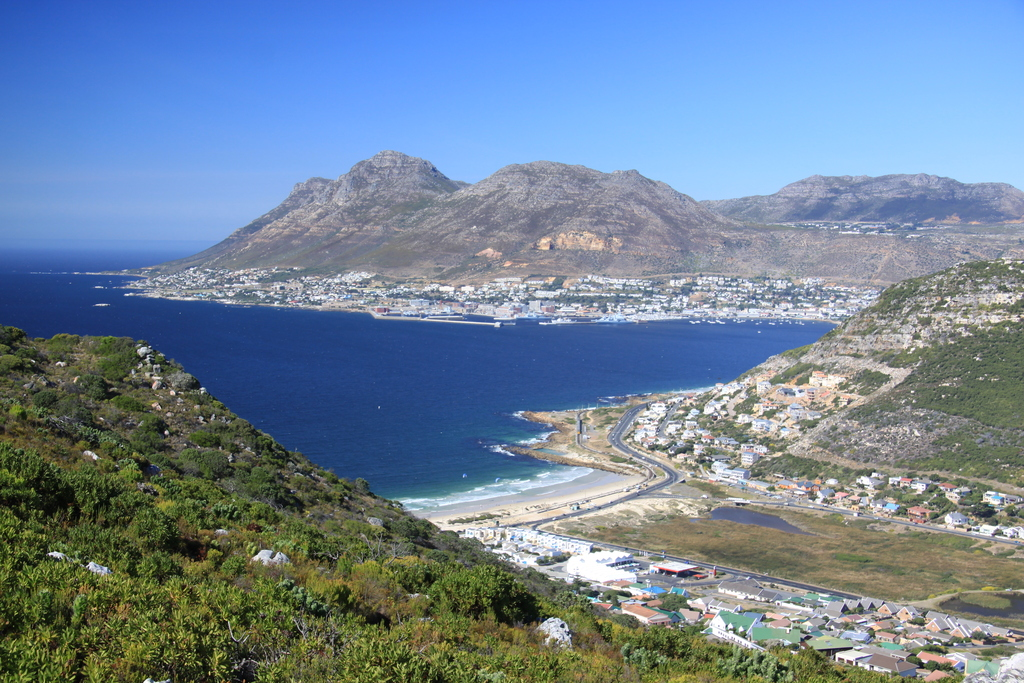
- View over Glencairn

- Location within Western Cape Location within South Africa
- Coordinates: 34°9′48″S 18°25′47″E
- Country: South Africa
- Province: Western Cape
- Municipality: City of Cape Town
- Main Place: Simon's Town

Area
  - Total: 0.62 km^{2} (0.24 sq mi)

Population (2011)
  - Total: 604
  - Density: 970/km^{2} (2,500/sq mi)

Racial makeup (2011)
  - Black African: 6.5%
  - Coloured: 4.5%
  - Indian/Asian: 1.7%
  - White: 82.8%
  - Other: 4.6%

First languages (2011)
  - English: 86.0%
  - Afrikaans: 9.6%
  - Other: 4.5%
- Time zone: UTC+2 (SAST)
- Postal code (street): 7975

Glencairn is a small seaside village located on the Cape Peninsula, South Africa. It is situated about 4 km north of Simonstown, on the shore of False Bay.

Access can be made from Fish Hoek or Simon's Town, via the M4, or from Noordhoek via the M6. Glencairn is made up of Glencairn Heights, Glen Ridge and Welcome Glen. There is a train stop at the south end of the suburb, with views across False Bay.

The beach is actively utilized for leisure activities such as swimming, surfing, kayaking and snorkeling. The Glencairn tidal pool can be enjoyed on a high tide at the south end of the beach. The Glencairn Wetland conserves the lower Else River.
