= Kalk Bay =

Suburb of Cape Town, Western Cape, South Africa

Kalk Bay Kalkbaai
- Kalk Bay viewed from Boyes Drive Kalk Bay Harbour

- Location within Western Cape Location within South Africa Location within Africa
- Coordinates: 34°07′40″S 18°26′54″E
- Country: South Africa
- Province: Western Cape
- Municipality: City of Cape Town
- Main Place: Cape Town

Government
  - Councillor: Aimee Kuhl (DA)

Area
  - Total: 0.32 km^{2} (0.12 sq mi)

Population (2011)
  - Total: 700
  - Density: 2,200/km^{2} (5,700/sq mi)

Racial makeup (2011)
  - Black African: 8.1%
  - Coloured: 32.3%
  - Indian/Asian: 0.1%
  - White: 54.6%
  - Other: 4.9%

First languages (2011)
  - English: 86.2%
  - Afrikaans: 10.3%
  - Other: 3.5%
- Time zone: UTC+2 (SAST)
- Postal code (street): 7975
- PO box: 7990

Kalk Bay (Afrikaans: Kalkbaai) is a fishing village and suburb of Cape Town. It lies on the west coast of False Bay, in the city's Southern Peninsula region. Much of the town is built on the slopes of mountains bordering the sea. These mountains, which have peaks of Table Mountain Sandstone, form several valleys. The railway from Cape Town to Simon's Town passes through Kalk Bay, which has one station near the harbour.

Kalk Bay is adjacent to the historically connected suburb of St James, with the division between the two being largely formal. They share the Kalk Bay & St. James Ratepayers and Residents Association, which manages a heritage committee and cooperates with the government on matters of safety and conservation.

In 2018, Forbes magazine named the neighbourhood one of the "coolest in the world", describing it as a "seaside haven" that was attracting more than just the local creative community. The suburb received a similar award from Time Out magazine in 2026. The publication recognized Kalk Bay's local food, culture, and community.

== History ==
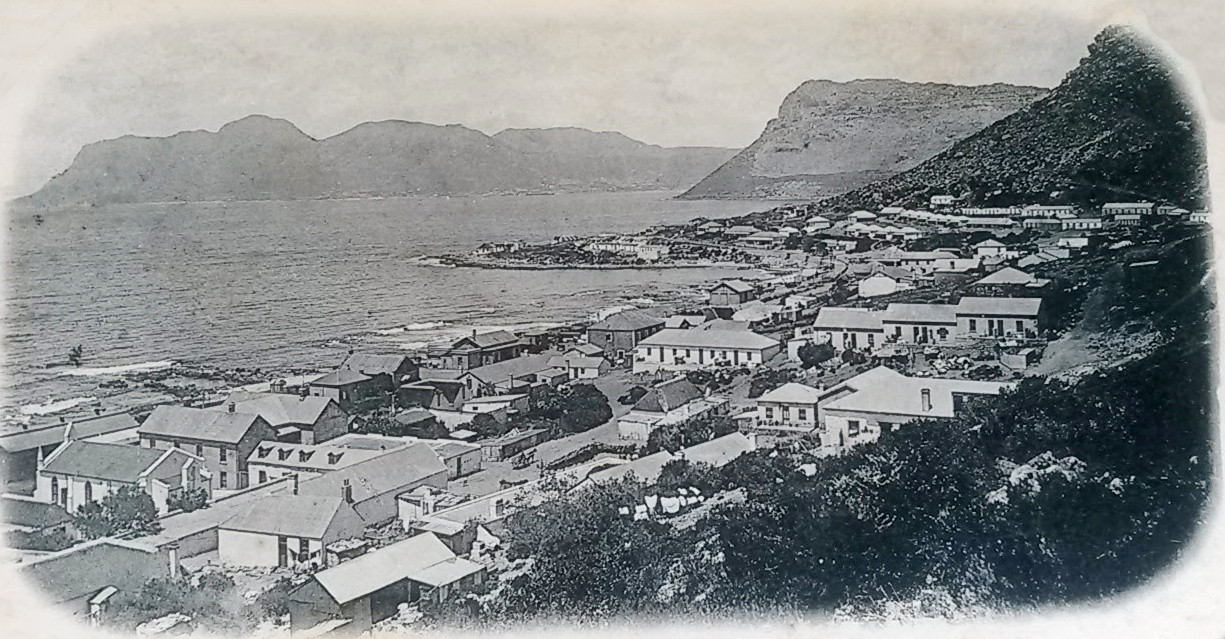
A historic postcard of Kalk Bay

=== Pre-colonial history ===
The history of the Kalk Bay area is difficult to separate from that of the wider False Bay region. It is likely that the area was inhabited by the Khoekhoe people for thousands of years before European settlement. An investigation of skeletons found in the coastal region has shown that the stature of these prehistoric people was within the range of modern Khoisan people. Middens found under cliff overhangs in the mountains above Kalk Bay indicate these sites may have been used for shelter, and archaeological evidence continues to be exposed through animal activity in the area.

=== European settlement and whaling ===
The village of Kalk Bay was likely established by the Dutch East India Company in the 17th century. The first written mention of the name Kalkbaai (Lime Bay) was by Governor Simon van der Stel in 1687, during a three-week expedition to sound and chart False Bay. The name is derived from the Dutch and Afrikaans words for the deposits of mussel shells which were burnt by early settlers to produce lime.

The early fishing population consisted primarily of slaves from Bengal, Indonesia, and Ceylon. They gained their freedom in 1807, when slavery was made illegal in the British Empire. This community was largely Muslim, leading to the construction of a mosque in 1846.

Under British rule, whaling became a major industry. Beginning around 1806, it drove settlement in the area and became the third-highest income-earning industry in the Cape, behind agriculture and wine-making. The whaling stations were relocated from Simon's Town to the coastline between Kalk Bay and St James after residents complained about the smell. By 1902, whaling at Kalk Bay had ceased as whale stocks became depleted.

=== Filipino community ===
The population was bolstered by the arrival of Filipino fishermen. According to local oral history, the first arrivals may have been as early as 1839, when a fisherman named Staggie Fernandez swam ashore from a ship in Simon's Town and walked to Kalk Bay. Other accounts state that a shipwrecked Filipino crew settled in Kalk Bay in the mid-1840s. The community grew significantly in the 1850s when refugees fled the Philippines to escape anti-Spanish riots. The predominantly Catholic Filipino community is considered the origin of the separation between Kalk Bay and St James, as the latter contains the area's only Catholic church.

=== Railway and harbour development ===
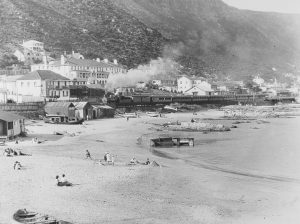
The Kalk Bay railway line in 1883

The Southern Line railway was extended to Kalk Bay in 1883, linking the village to Cape Town and allowing fish to be transported efficiently to the city. The arrival of the railway, however, jeopardized the practice of launching small fishing boats from the beach. This, combined with the use of larger fishing vessels in False Bay, increased pressure to construct an artificial harbour.

Construction on the harbour began on 6 March 1913, under the supervision of engineer-in-charge C. Le S. Furlong. On 7 June 1913, the Minister of Railways and Harbours, Henry Burton, laid the foundation stone. The project was largely completed by 1918, resulting in an 8-acre basin with a breakwater, a fish-landing quay, and a slipway. A secondary mole was added between 1937 and 1939.

=== Apartheid era ===
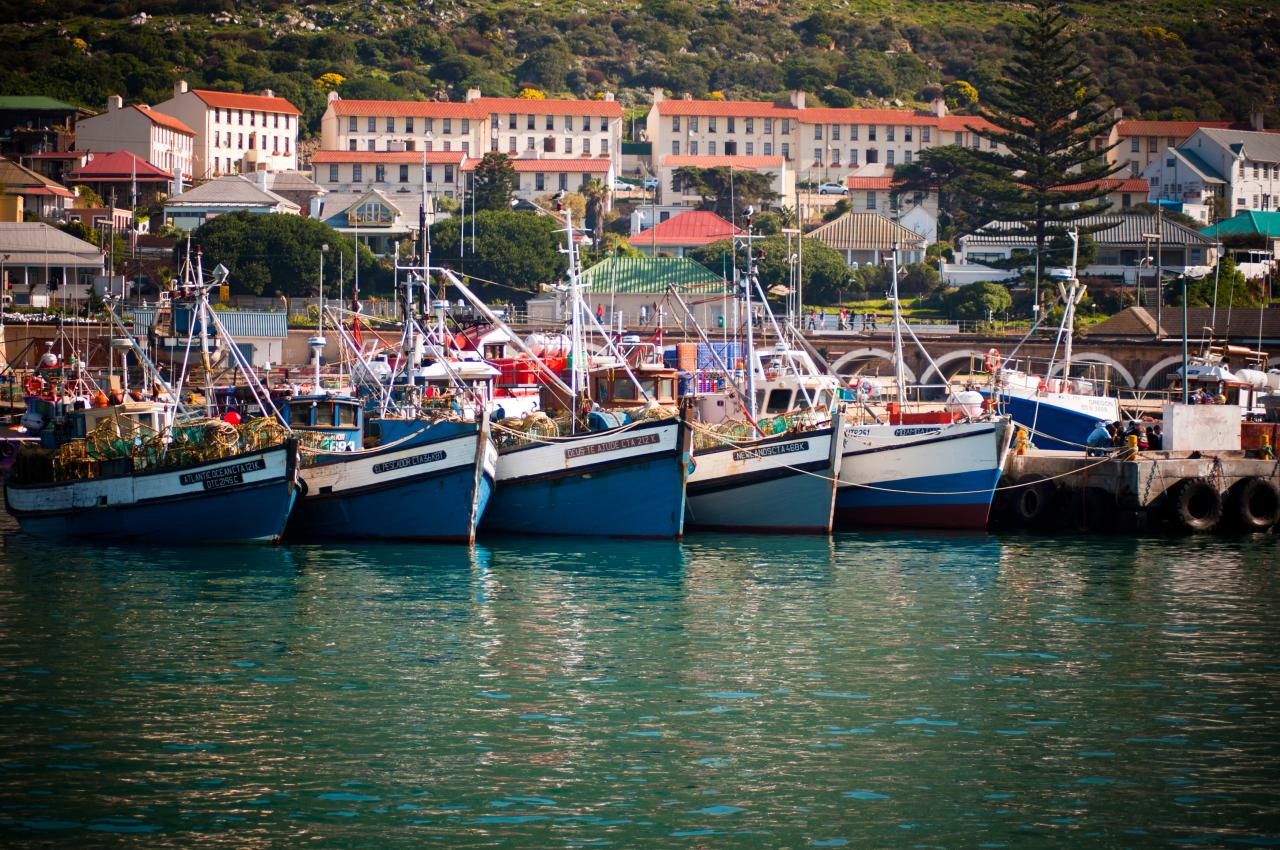
The "Fisherman Flats" from the harbour, identifiable by their red roofs and tan colouring

The Slums Act of 1934, which was often applied to advance segregation, led to the demolition of houses in an area of Kalk Bay known as Die Land. This housing was largely inhabited by the Coloured fishing population. The community successfully fought for replacement housing to be built in the same location, leading to the construction of a set of flats between 1941 and 1945, colloquially known as the "Fishermen's Flats".

In 1967, Kalk Bay was proclaimed a "White Area" under the Group Areas Act. This led to significant protest and a historically unique reversal: the fishing community was permitted to remain in the flats, as they had to stay close to their boats. While a 15-year deadline was set for their eventual removal, it was never acted upon, and most of the population remained. Roughly a quarter of families were evicted.

== Tourism ==
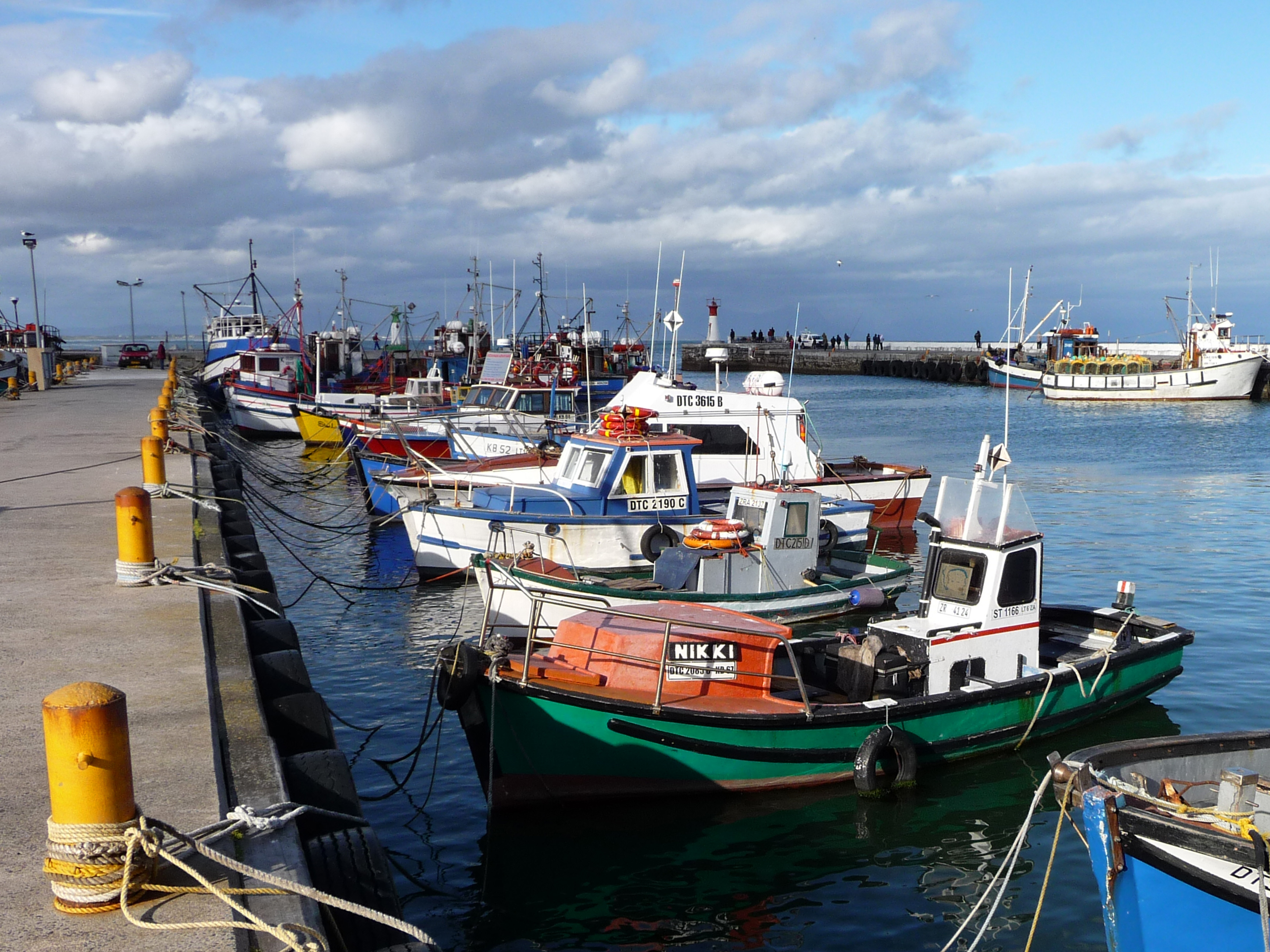
Kalk Bay harbour

Kalk Bay's historically dominant fishing industry has largely been replaced by tourism. This shift is driven by several notable attractions. The harbour still hosts an active fishing industry; however, it has also become a popular tourist attraction. It features several seafood restaurants and a fresh fish market. It is also known for its population of brown fur seals.

Kalk Bay has a reef with a break known as "Kalk Bay Reef". It is known for heavy barrels and the associated shallow reef, which makes it more hazardous than most popular surf spots. It is best surfed on a large south-easterly swell or a north-westerly wind. In smaller swells, low tide makes for better barrels. The waves are often good for surfing in the winter and early spring.

Another popular activity is whale watching, as Southern right whales migrate through False Bay during several months of the year.

In addition, the mountains above Kalk Bay contain several hiking trails, including Echo Valley and Trappieskop (Afrikaans for 'steps hill'). These are accessible from Boyes Drive, which runs across the mountain above Kalk Bay. The hills contain over eighty caves, varying in complexity. Trails can be used to access sandstone caves known as "Boomslang Cave" and "Ronan's Well", which has over 400 metres of passage. These are popular among amateur cavers for their ease of access, relative safety, and simple layouts.

These caves are of importance to speleologists because they have formed in sandstone. Large cave systems are not often found in this type of chemically nonreactive rock.

== Coat of arms ==
Kalk Bay (including Muizenberg and St James) was a municipality from 1895 to 1913. The town council assumed a coat of arms, designed by Frank Newnes, in July 1901.

The shield was divided horizontally. The upper half was divided vertically, depicting a fishing boat (partly obscured by a small shield) and eight fleurs de lis, while the lower half depicted a bunch of grapes. A small shield displaying an arum lily was placed in the centre.

== See also ==
- Ports and harbours in South Africa
