= Chapman's Peak =

Mountain on the Cape Peninsula, South Africa

Chapman's Peak Drive
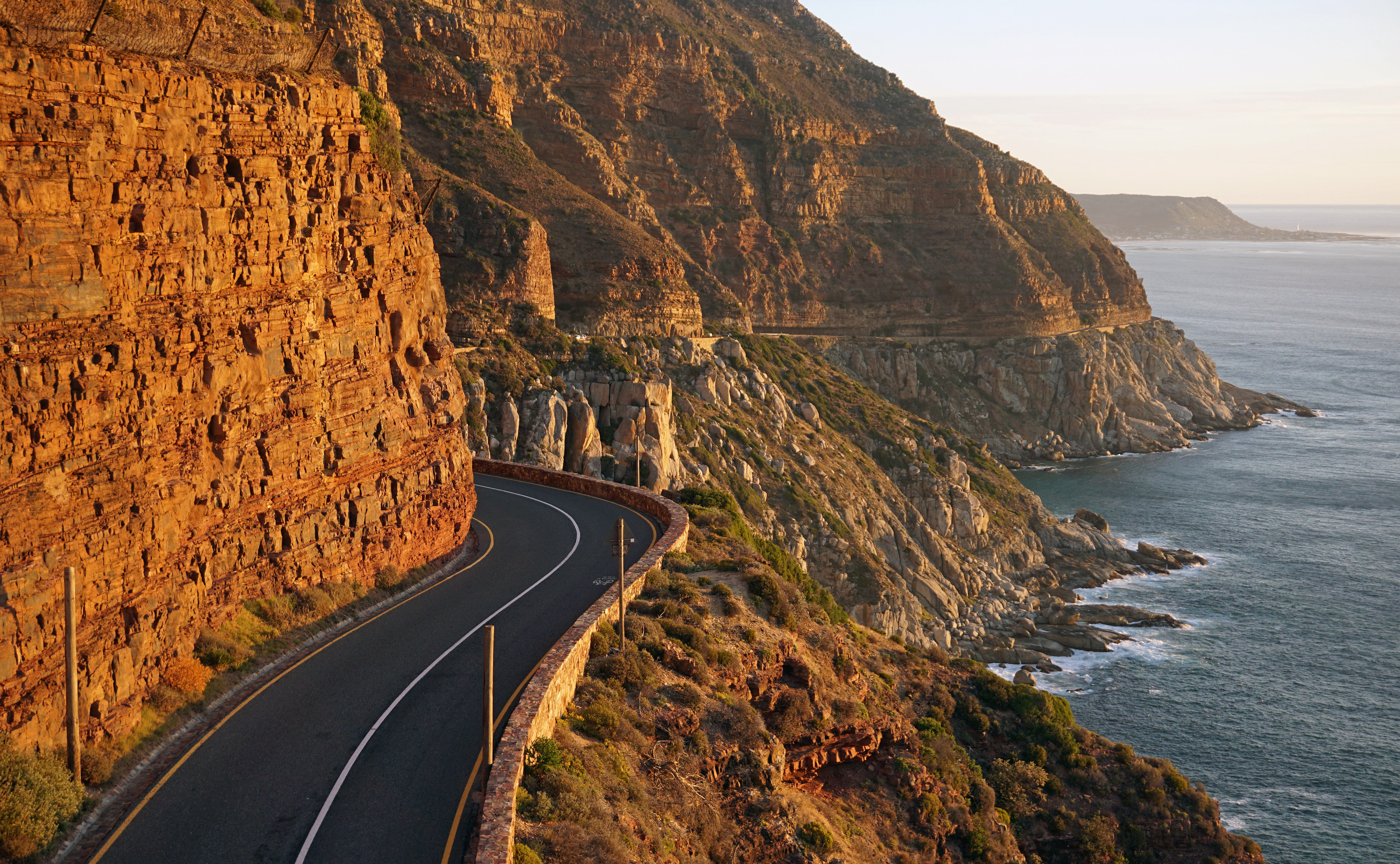
- Chapman's Peak Drive facing southwards.
- Location of Chapman's Peak Drive in the City of Cape Town.
- Length: 9.5 km (5.9 mi)
- Traversed by: M6

Location
- Location: Cape Peninsula, Western Cape, South Africa
- Range: Table Mountain
- Coordinates: 34°5′14″S 18°21′38″E
- Chapman's Peak (Western Cape) Chapman's Peak (Cape Town)

Chapman's Peak is a mountain on the western side of the Cape Peninsula, between Hout Bay and Noordhoek in Cape Town, South Africa. The western flank of the mountain falls sharply for hundreds of metres into the Atlantic Ocean, and a road, known as Chapman's Peak Drive, hugs the near-vertical face of the mountain, linking Hout Bay to Noordhoek. Tourists and locals often stop at viewpoints along this road, which offer views of Hout Bay, The Sentinel peak and surrounds, as well as over Noordhoek Beach.

Chapman's Peak Drive is part of the route of two of South Africa's biggest mass-participation races, the Cape Town Cycle Tour and the Two Oceans Marathon.

== History ==
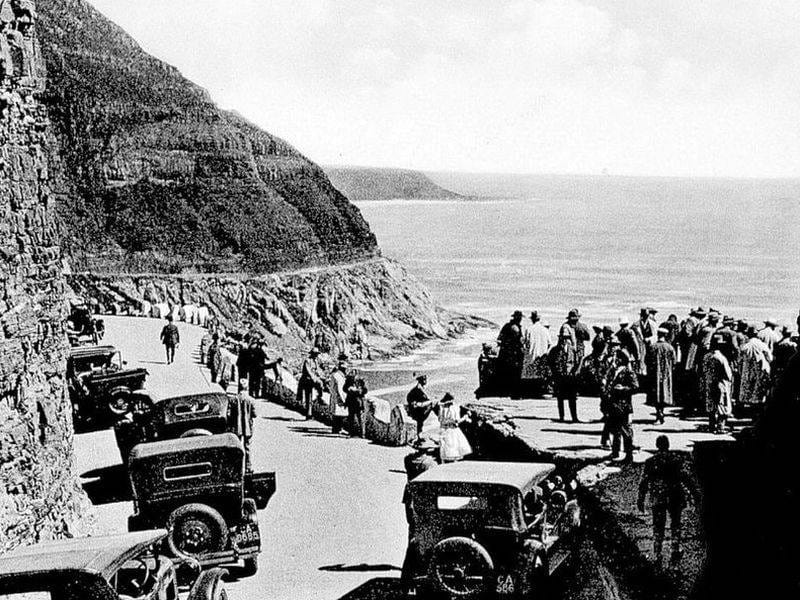
The official opening of Chapman's Peak Drive, Cape Town, on the 6 May 1922 by Prince Arthur of Conaught.

Chapman's Peak is named after John Chapman, the pilot of an English ship becalmed in today's Hout Bay in 1607. The skipper sent his pilot ashore to find provisions, and the name was recorded as Chapman's Chaunce.

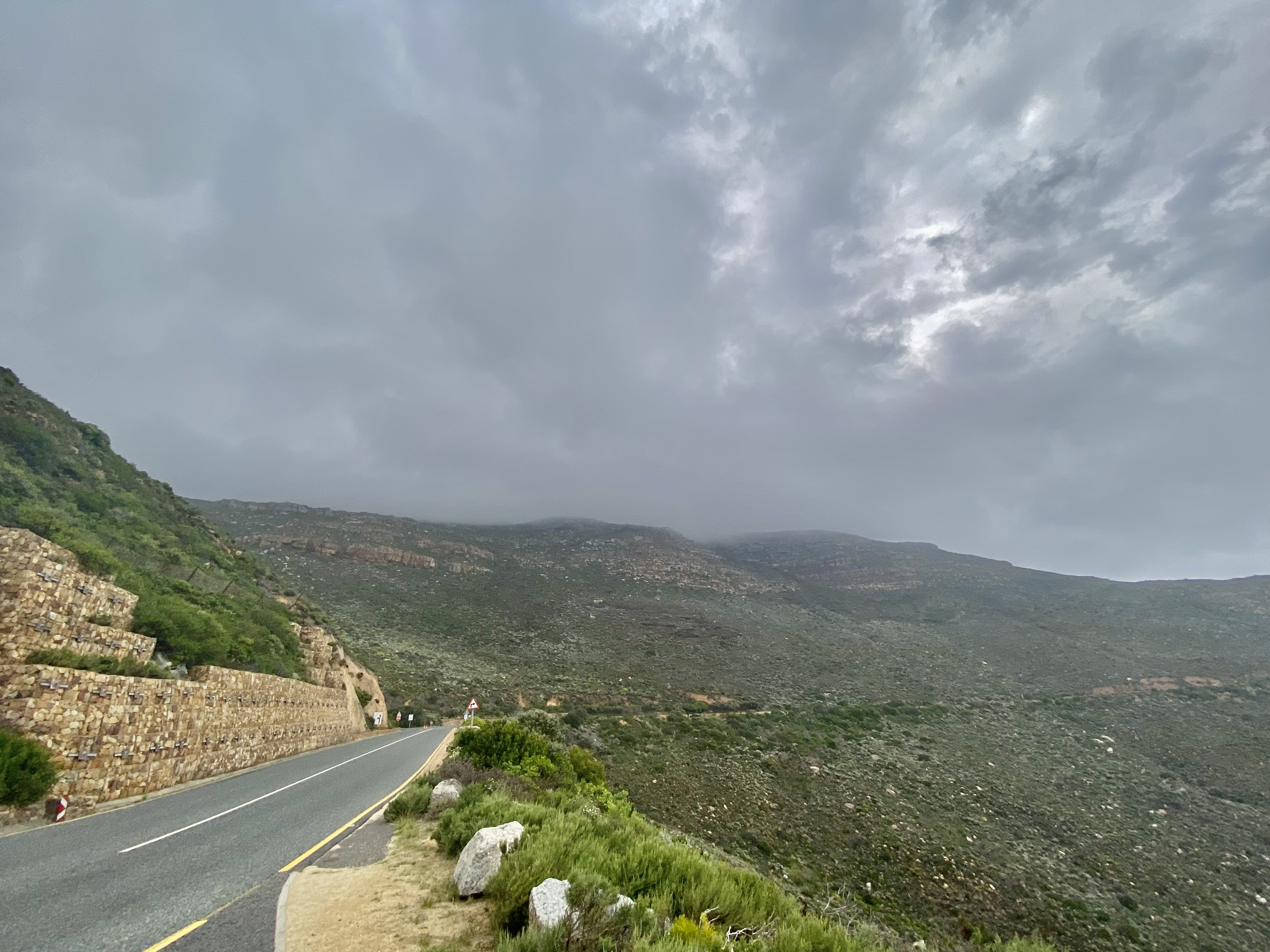
Chapman’s Peak Dr

Chapman's Peak Drive was hacked out of the face of the mountain between 1915 and 1922, and at the time was regarded as a major feat of engineering. The road was closed in the 1990s, after a rockfall caused a death and a subsequent lawsuit, and subsequently reopened after being re-engineered to protect motorists from falling rocks. It was reopened in 2005 as a toll road, part of the M6. The road was again closed for a number of months beginning on 19 June 2008 "as a result of risk areas identified on the mountain above the road".

== Geology ==
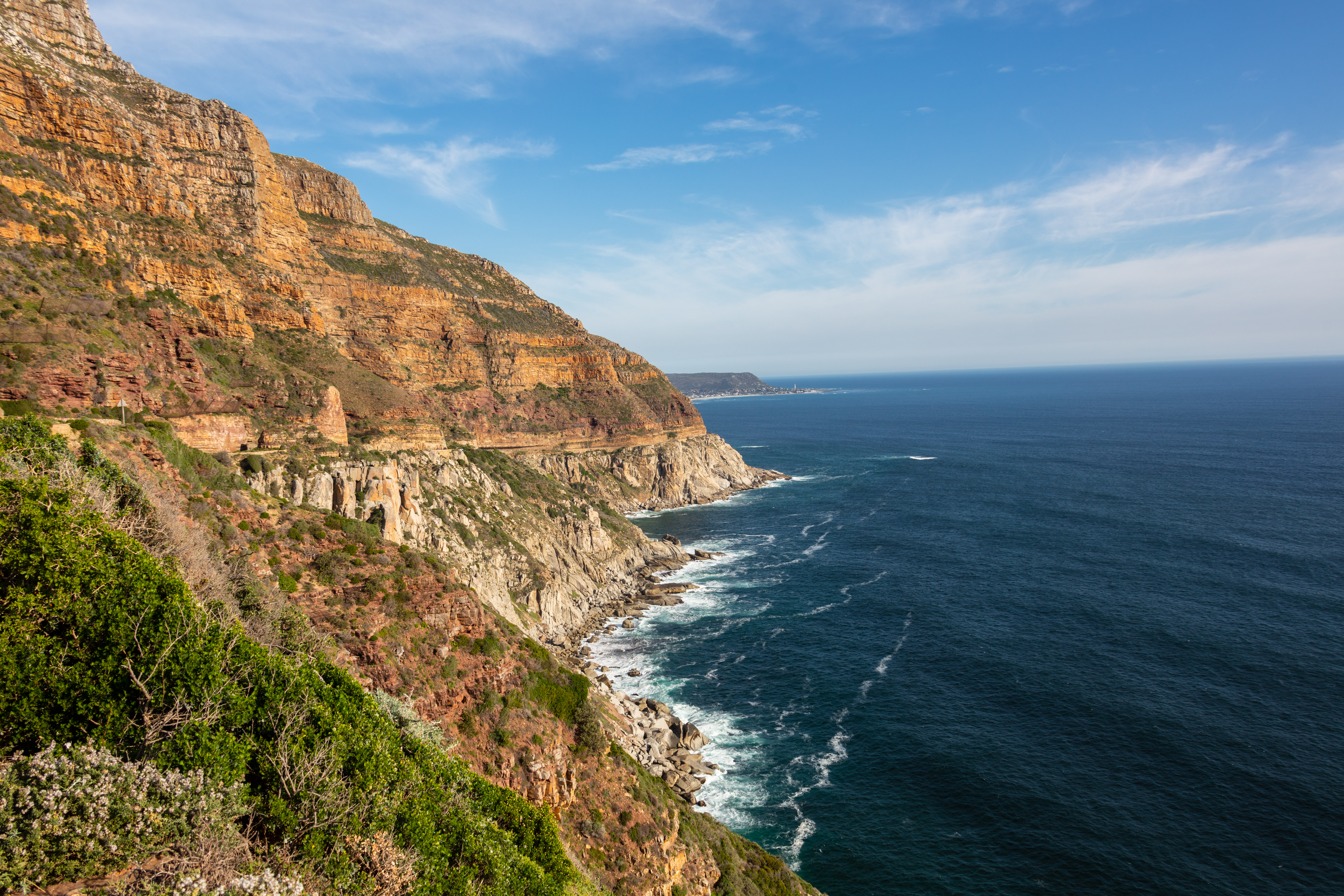
Chapman's Peak Drive. The pass is built on top of a layer of granite, cut into the softer sedimentary rocks above.

The top of Chapman's Peak consists of flat, sedimentary rocks related to those that form Table Mountain. The base of the mountain, however, consists of Cape Granite and the two formations meet at a geological unconformity that is world-famous amongst earth scientists.
Two endangered vegetation types can be found along this road, and correspond to the two main geological formations. They are Peninsula Sandstone Fynbos and Cape Granite Fynbos and they are both endemic to the city of Cape Town, occurring nowhere else.

There is an abandoned manganese mine on the northwestern slopes of the peak. The remains of a jetty from which the ore used to be shipped are directly below the workings.

== Gallery ==
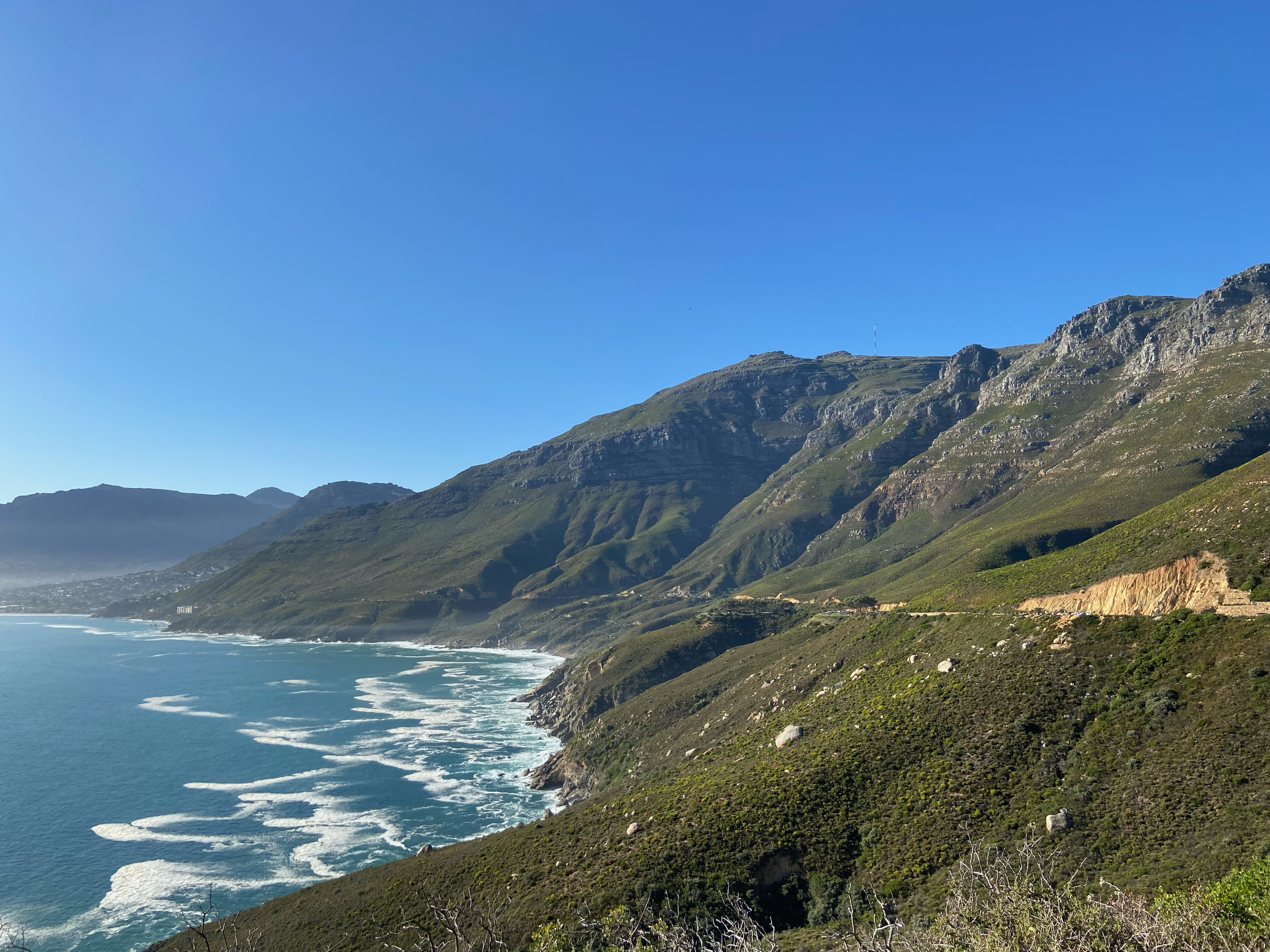
Hout Bay, as viewed from Chapman's Peak Drive.

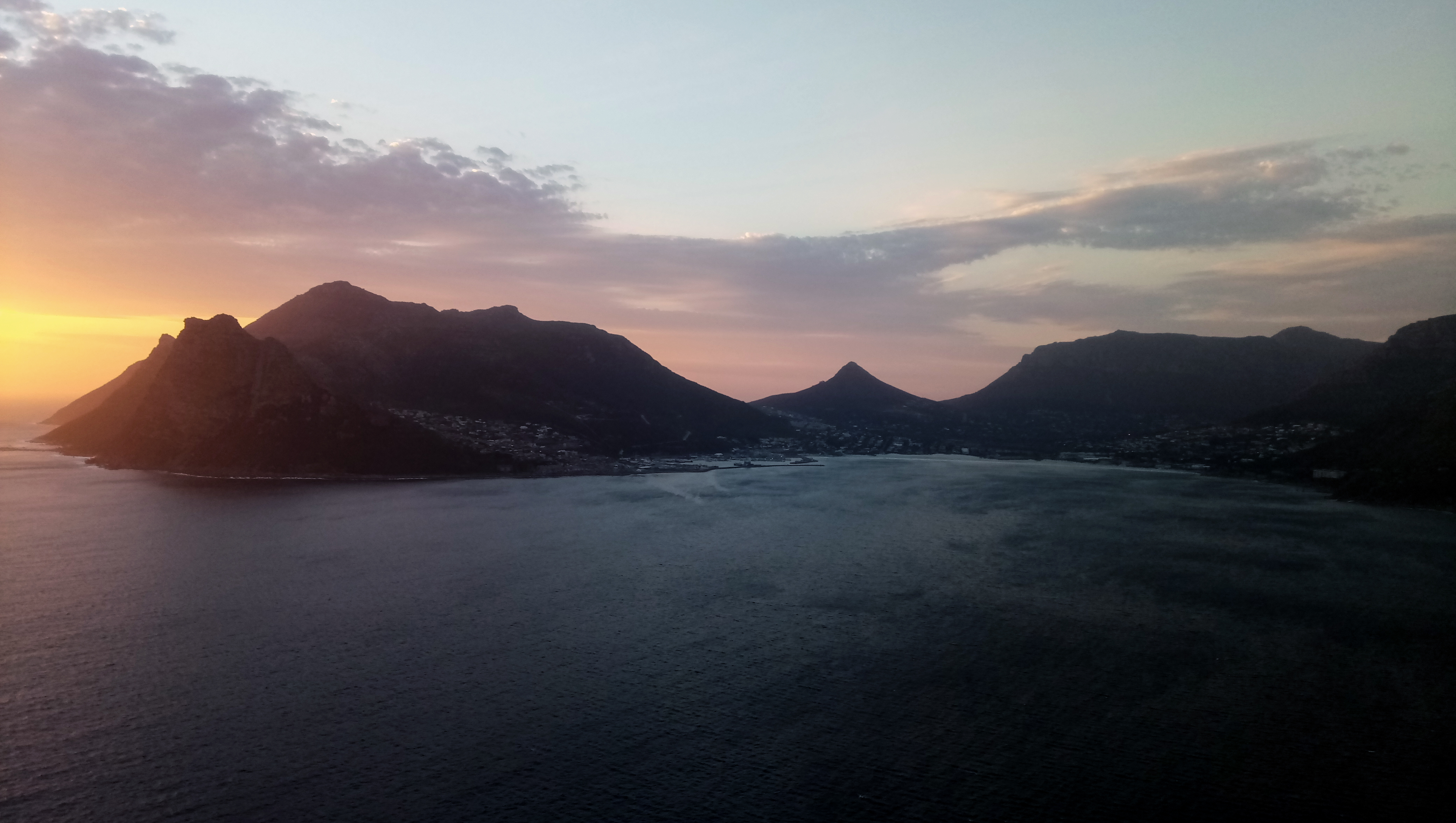
Sunset at Hout Bay viewed from Chapman's Peak Drive

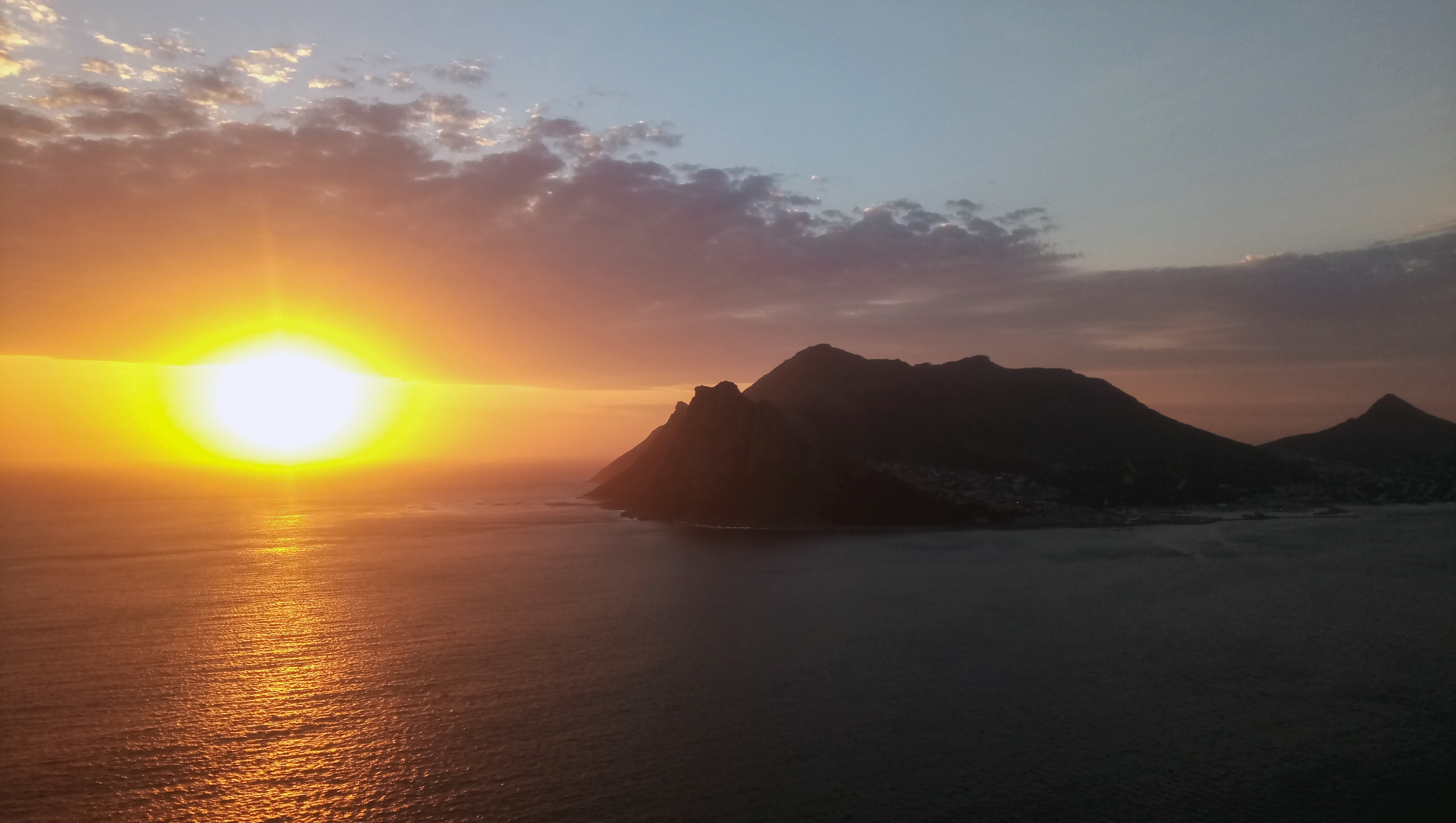
Before sunset at Hout Bay viewed from Chapman's Peak Drive

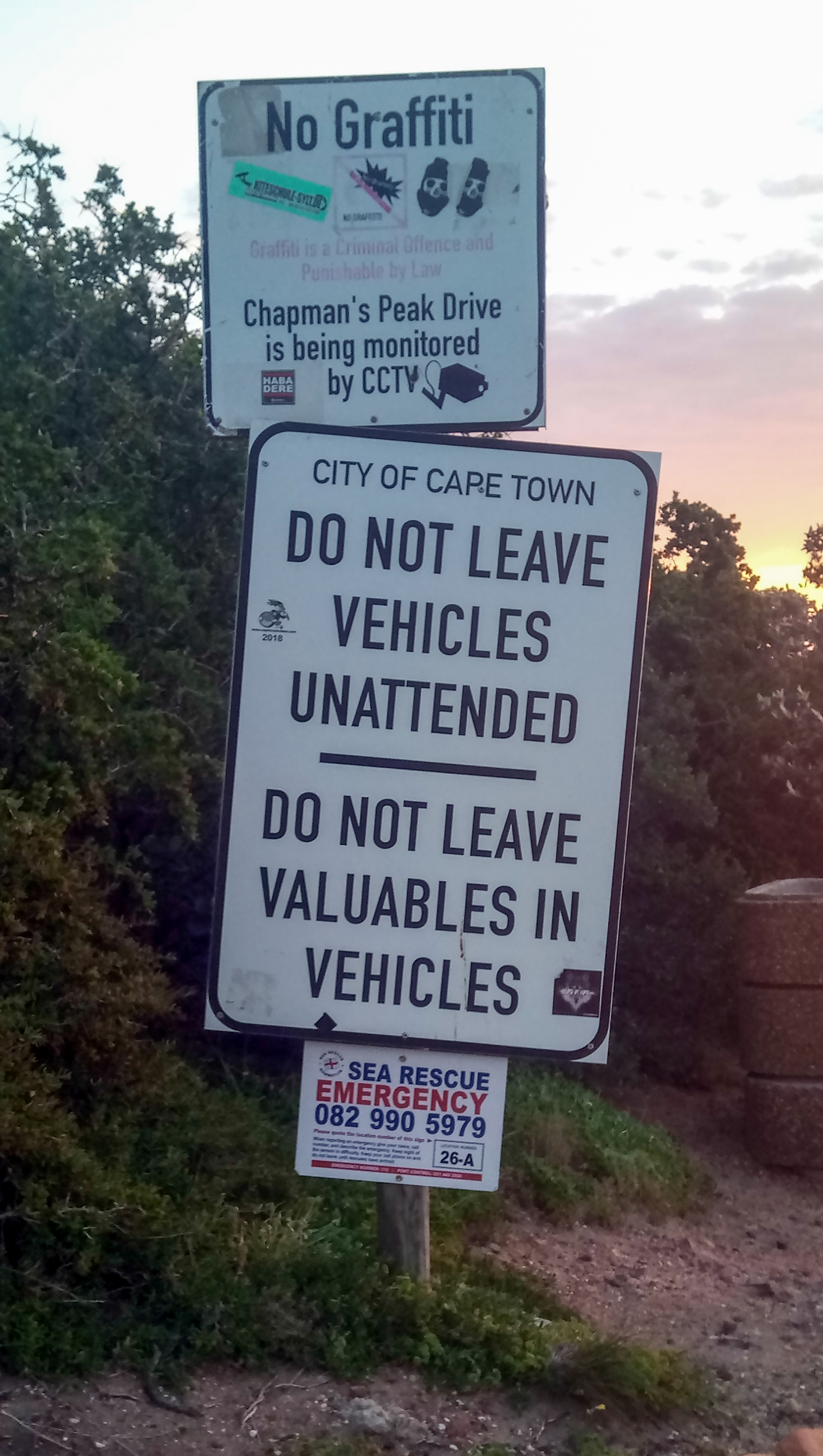
Chapman's Peak Drive sign

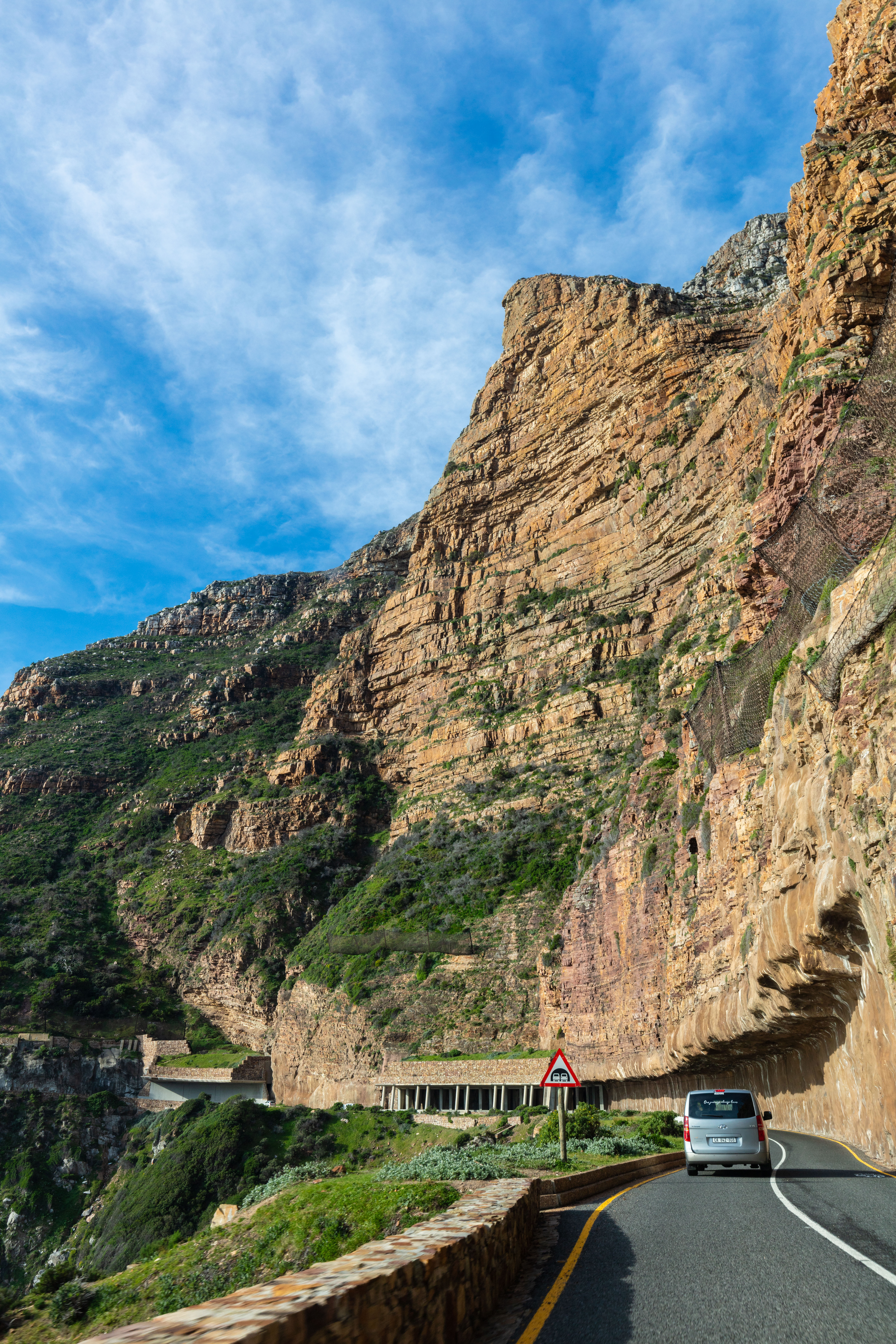
Rockfall shelters on Chapman's Peak Drive

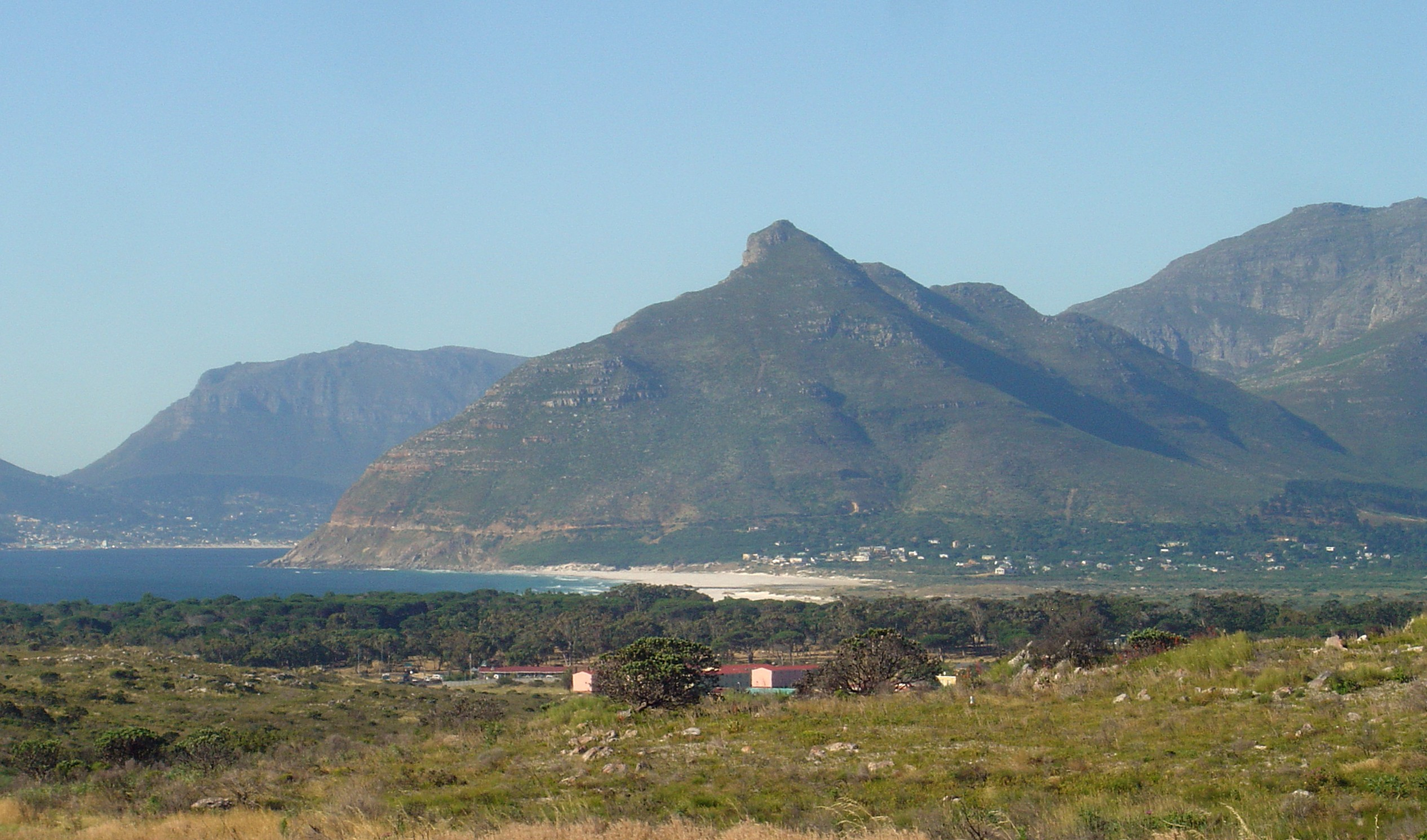
Chapman's Peak, seen from Noordhoek

Video of Chapman's Peak Drive

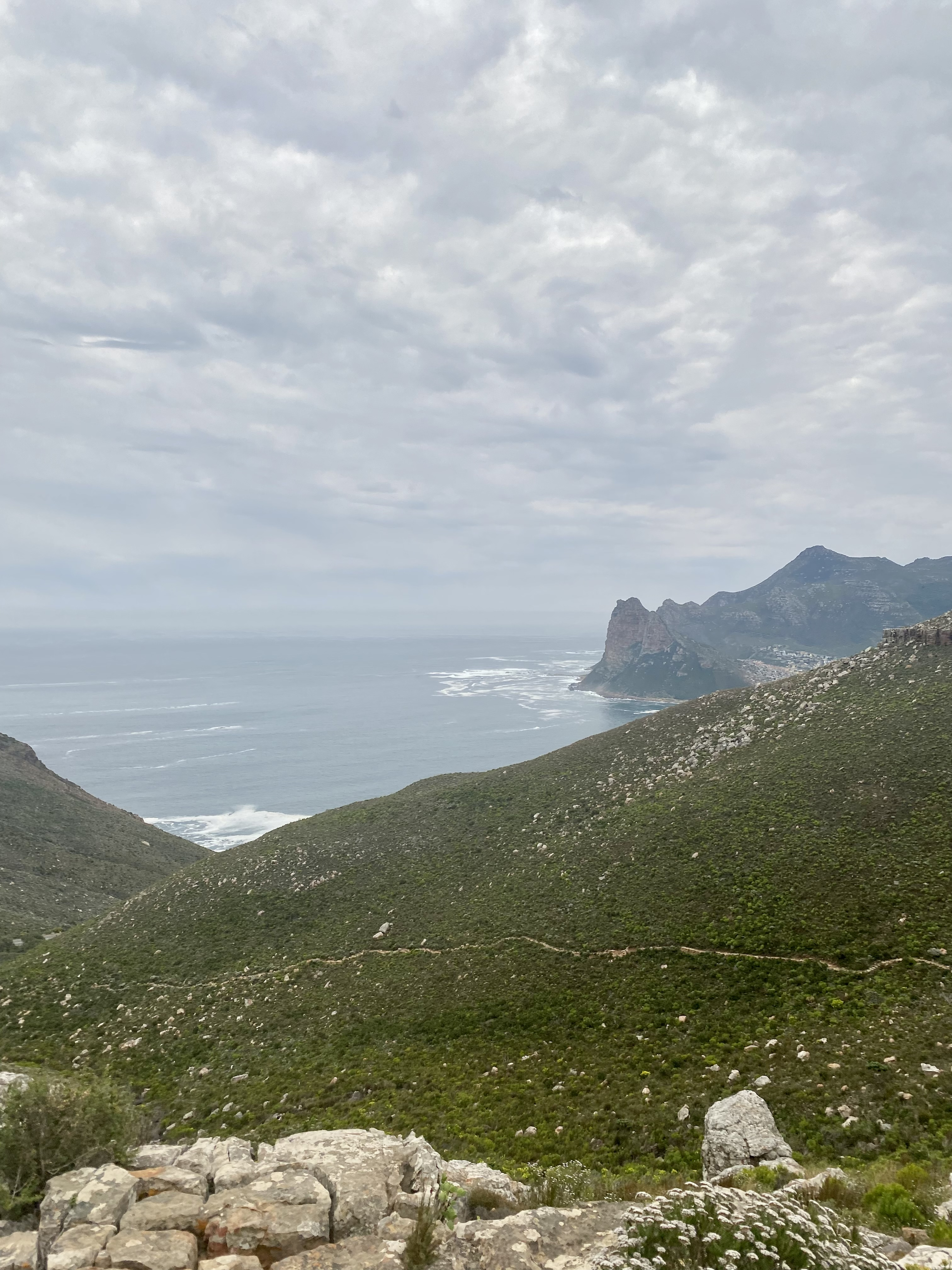
Chapman’s Peak Hiking Trail

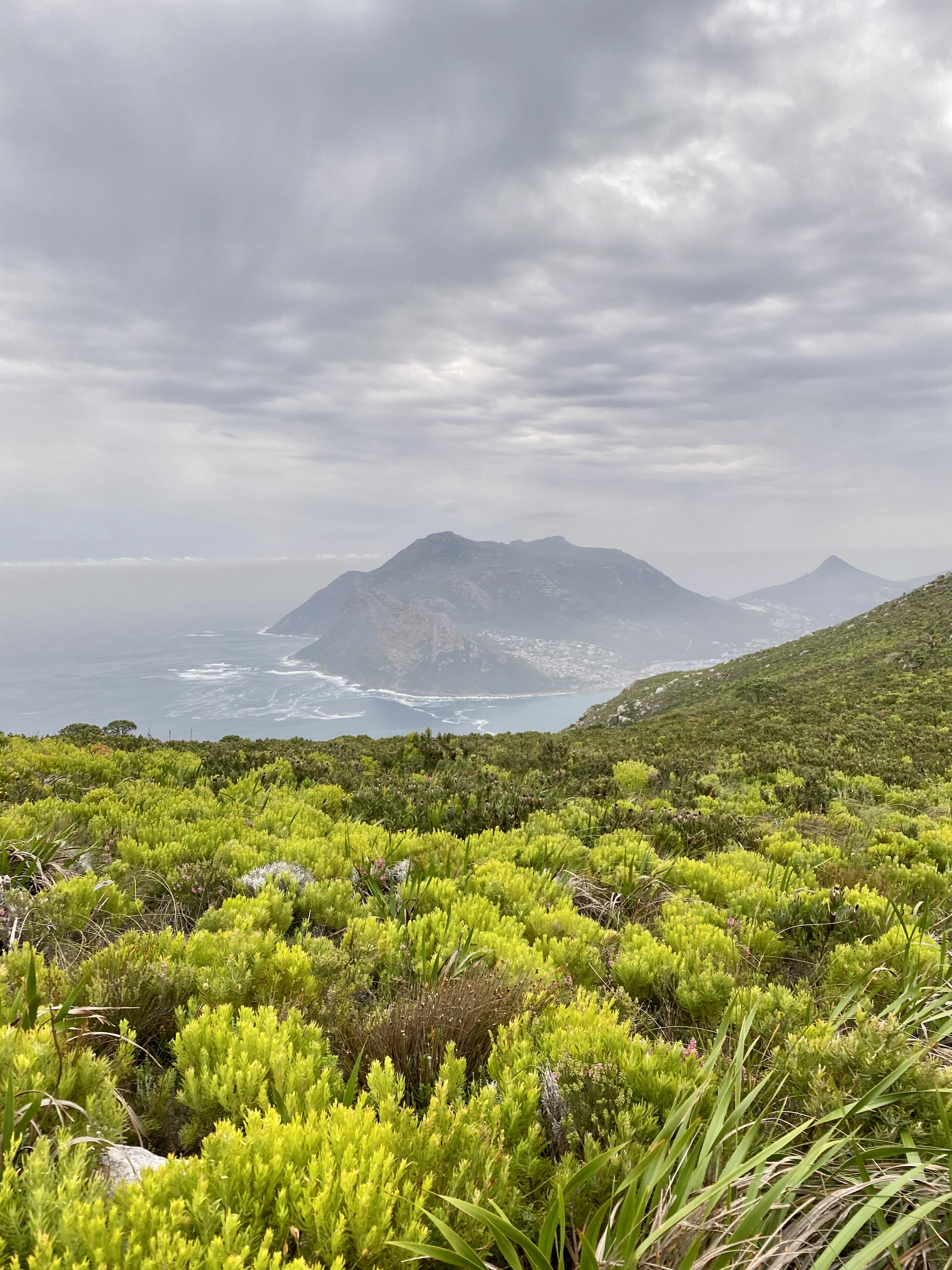
Hout Bay Harbour seen from The Hiking Trail

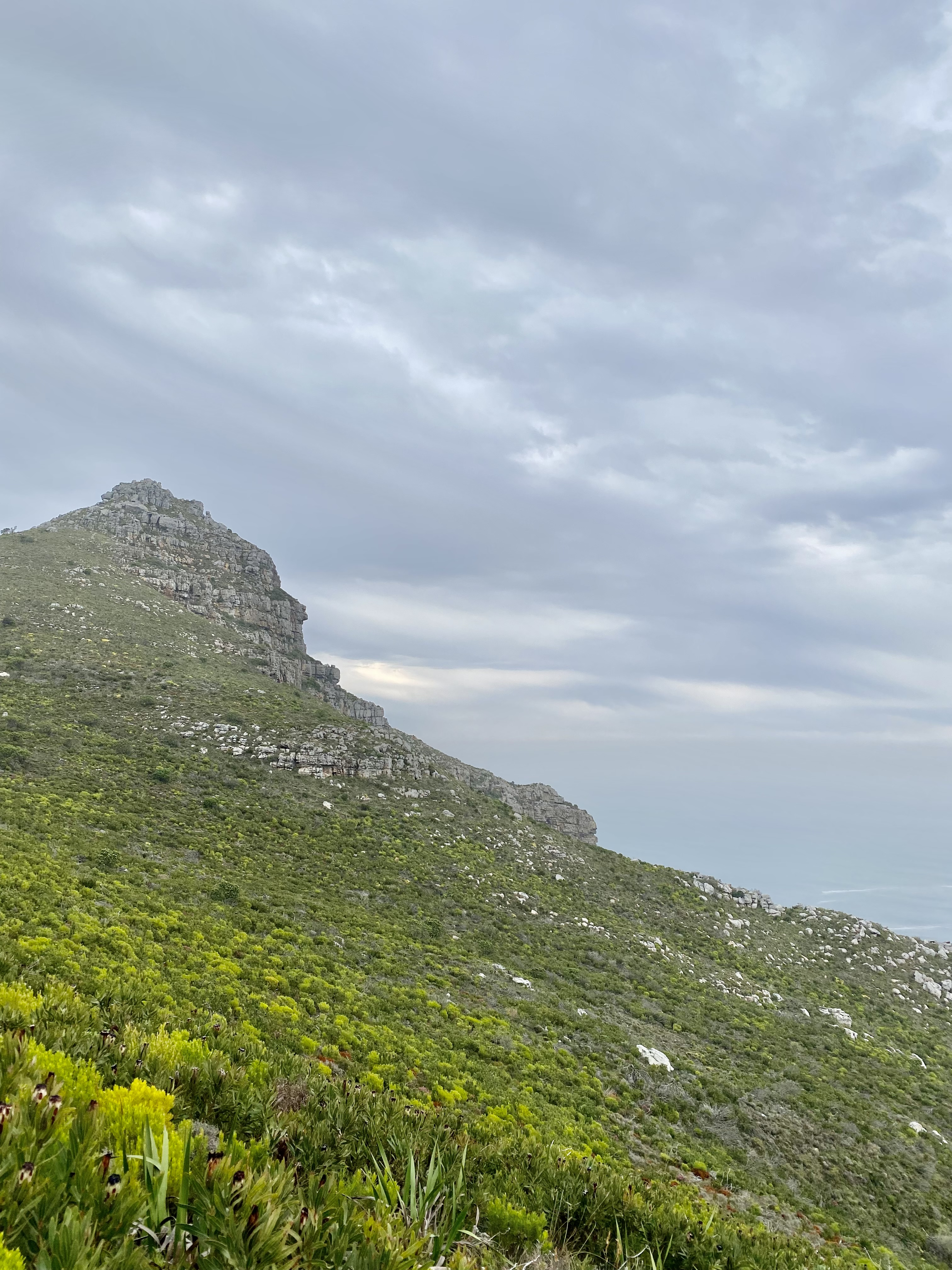
