= Kommetjie =

Seaside village in the Western Cape, South Africa

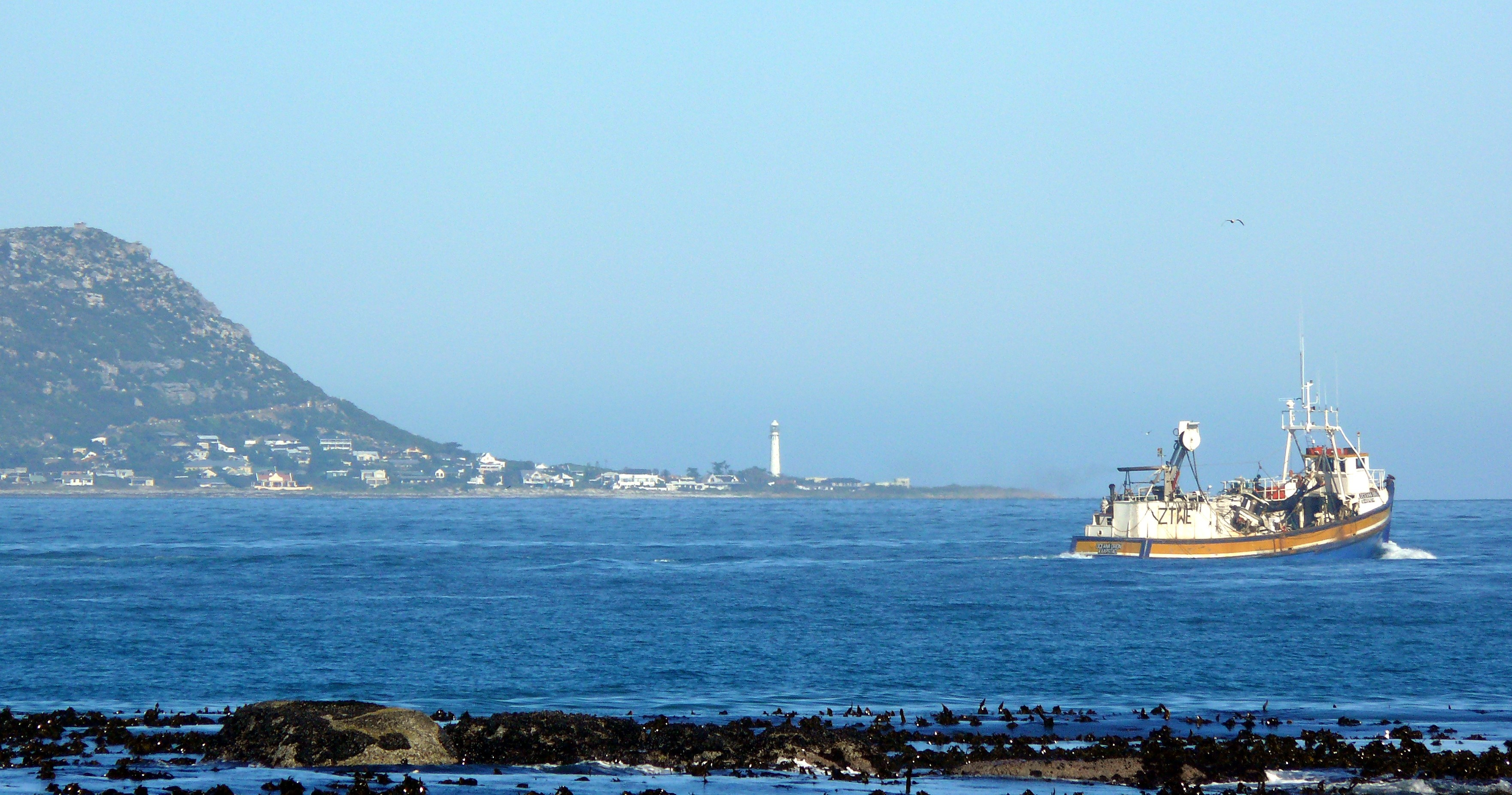
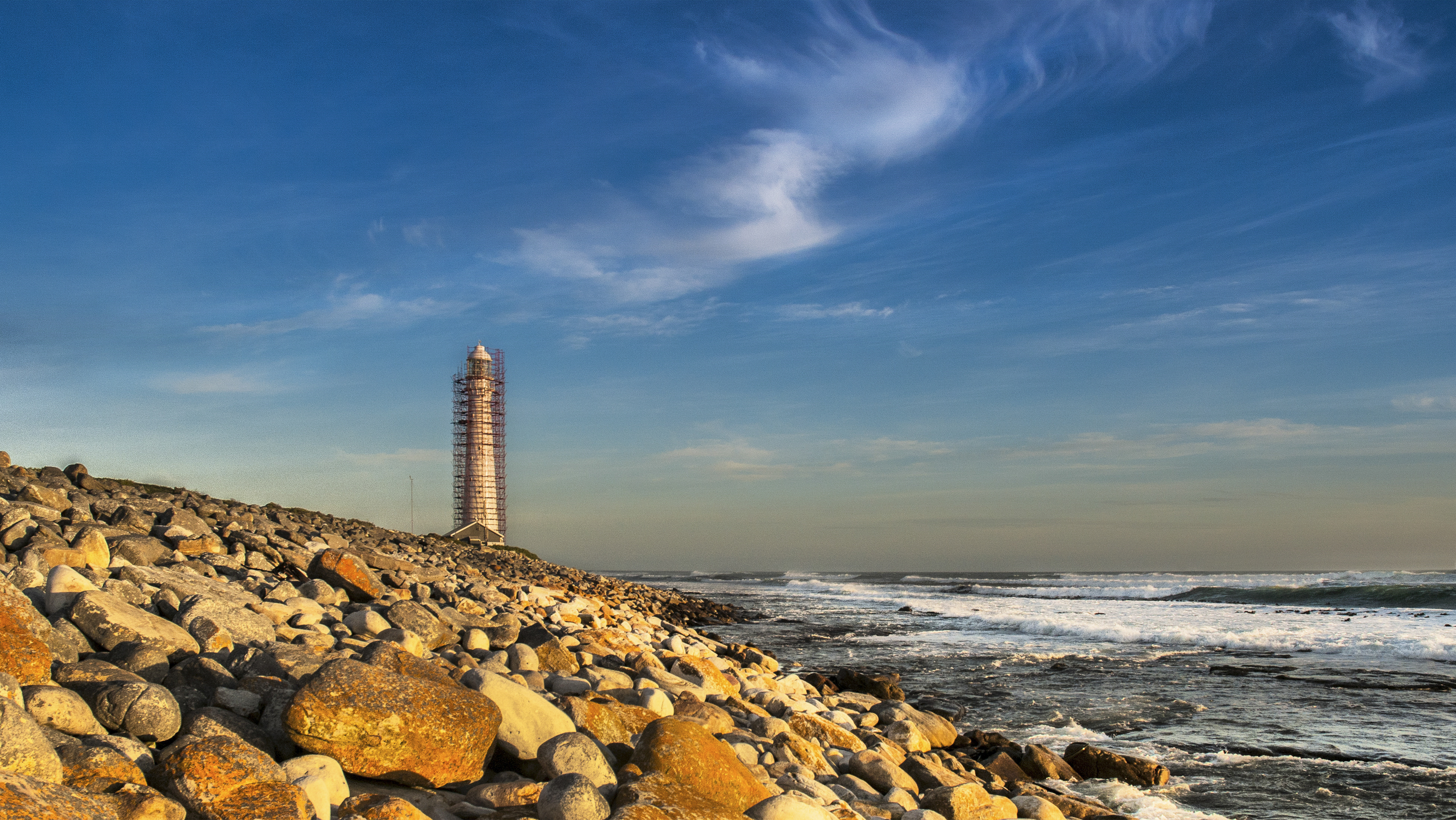
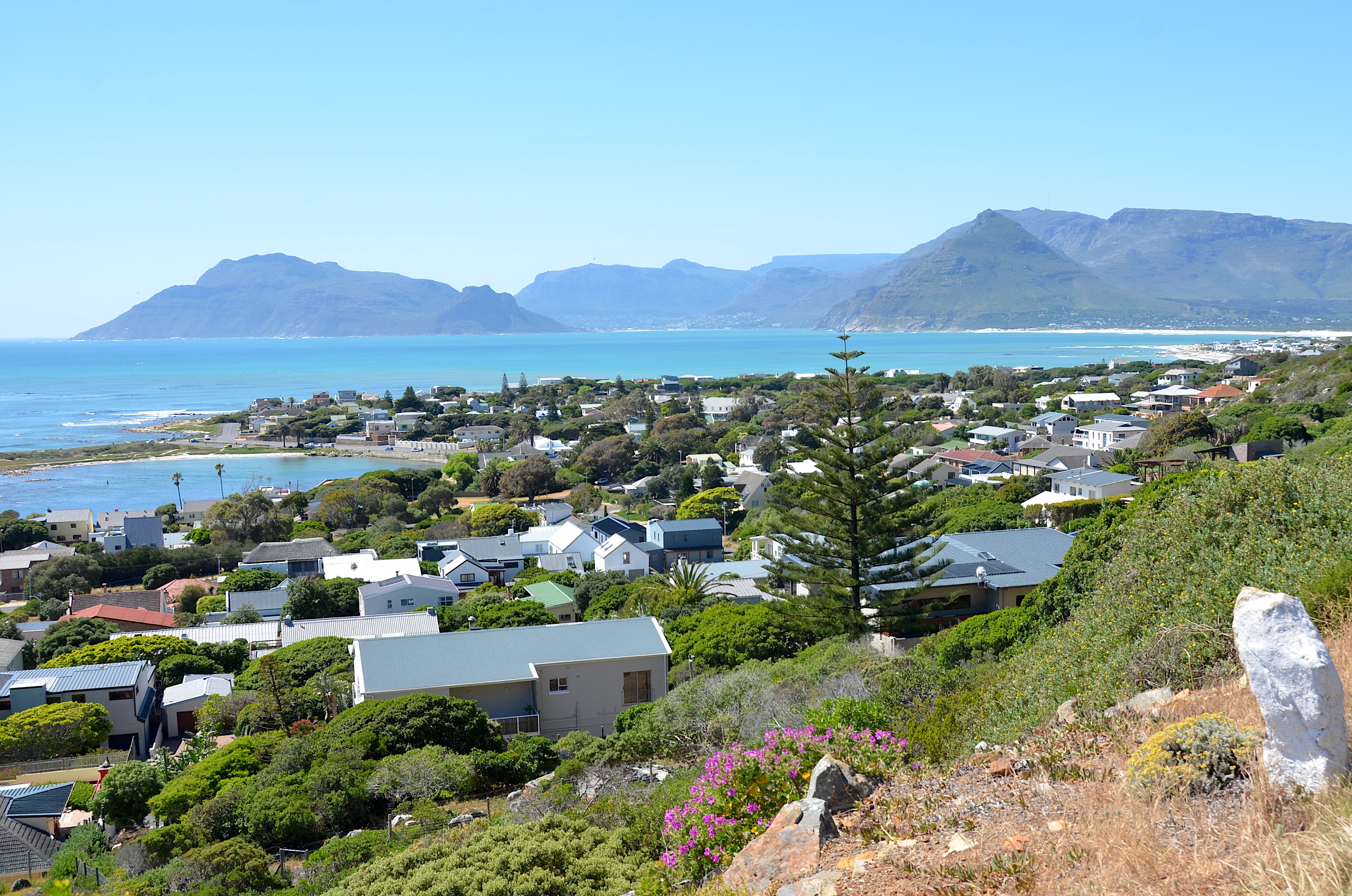
- Kommetjie viewed from Hout Bay

- Street map of Kommetjie

- Location within Western Cape Location within South Africa
- Coordinates: 34°08′25″S 18°19′45″E
- Country: South Africa
- Province: Western Cape
- Municipality: City of Cape Town
- Main Place: Kommetjie

Area
  - Total: 2.56 km^{2} (0.99 sq mi)

Population (2011)
  - Total: 2,435
  - Density: 951/km^{2} (2,460/sq mi)

Racial makeup (2011)
  - Black African: 2.7%
  - Coloured: 3.5%
  - Indian/Asian: 0.4%
  - White: 92.0%
  - Other: 1.3%

First languages (2011)
  - English: 86.5%
  - Afrikaans: 10.3%
  - Other: 3.2%
- Time zone: UTC+2 (SAST)
- Postal code (street): 7976
- PO box: 7976

Kommetjie (Afrikaans for "small basin," approximately pronounced caw-me-key) is a small town near Cape Town, in the Western Cape province of South Africa. It forms part of the City of Cape Town metro area.

It lies about halfway down the west coast of the Cape Peninsula, at the southern end of the long wide beach that runs northwards towards Chapman's Peak and Noordhoek. The community of Ocean View is located to its immediate south east.

It was founded in 1902 when a consortium of businessmen developed the area as a residential suburb of Cape Town. The town was modernised in the 1960s when electricity and municipal running water was installed.

The area is a popular spot for surfing, since powerful waves from the Atlantic Ocean rise up over rocky reefs formed by hard sandstones of the Table Mountain Group. Wherever the bottom is rocky, the shallower waters are thick with giant kelp forests. Kommetjie is famous for its excellent crayfishing although changes in fishing quotas have drastically reduced the daily catch allowed.

== Geography ==
Kommetjie is situated on the narrow coastal plain below the mountains, on the western side of the southern Cape Peninsula, beside the Atlantic Ocean which has cold currents in this region, and is exposed to the prevailing south westerly swell from the Southern Ocean.

The Slangkop Lighthouse, which stands about 33 meters tall, is situated on the beach. The lighthouse can be seen from the Ou Kaapse Weg mountain pass and has been around since 1919.

== Sport and recreation ==
The Cape Town Cycle Tour each year passes through this small town. The southwesterly swell produces attractive waves for surfing on the local coastal reefs, and the area is popular for crayfish and fishing as there is a beach launching area for small craft. It is a quiet and relaxing town suitable for camping and getaways. There is a small but popular public library. Not far from Kommetjie, along Long Beach near Noordhoek, lies the wreck of the SS Kakapo, which ran aground in 1900. When locals aren’t surfing, they are skateboarding.

== Local businesses ==
Kommetjie supports a small number of small enterprises, including a Shell garage (including a Shell Select), a convenience store, a laundromat, a small mail-order computer business, a café, and a variety of restaurants. A farm stall located on the grounds of Kommetjie Primary School sells organic produce grown in a market garden on the school grounds.

== Fauna and Flora ==
Kommetjie hosts a variety of plant and animal species, many of which are endangered. Kommetjie is especially well known for its Milkwood groves, birdwatching and baboon troops, which frequently come down from their home on the nearby hills to raid for food among the residences.

Kommetjie is also part of the fynbos biome, which boasts the highest number of plant species per square kilometre. Some of the rarest and most sought after plants are found in this biome, but face threat from a variety of aliens, mostly Australian plants, imported in the 1800s.

== Notable residents ==
- Chris Bertish (1974), surfer and motivational speaker
- Jeremy Loops (1984), singer-songwriter
- Alice Phoebe Lou (1993), singer-songwriter
