= Noordhoek, Cape Town =

Noordhoek
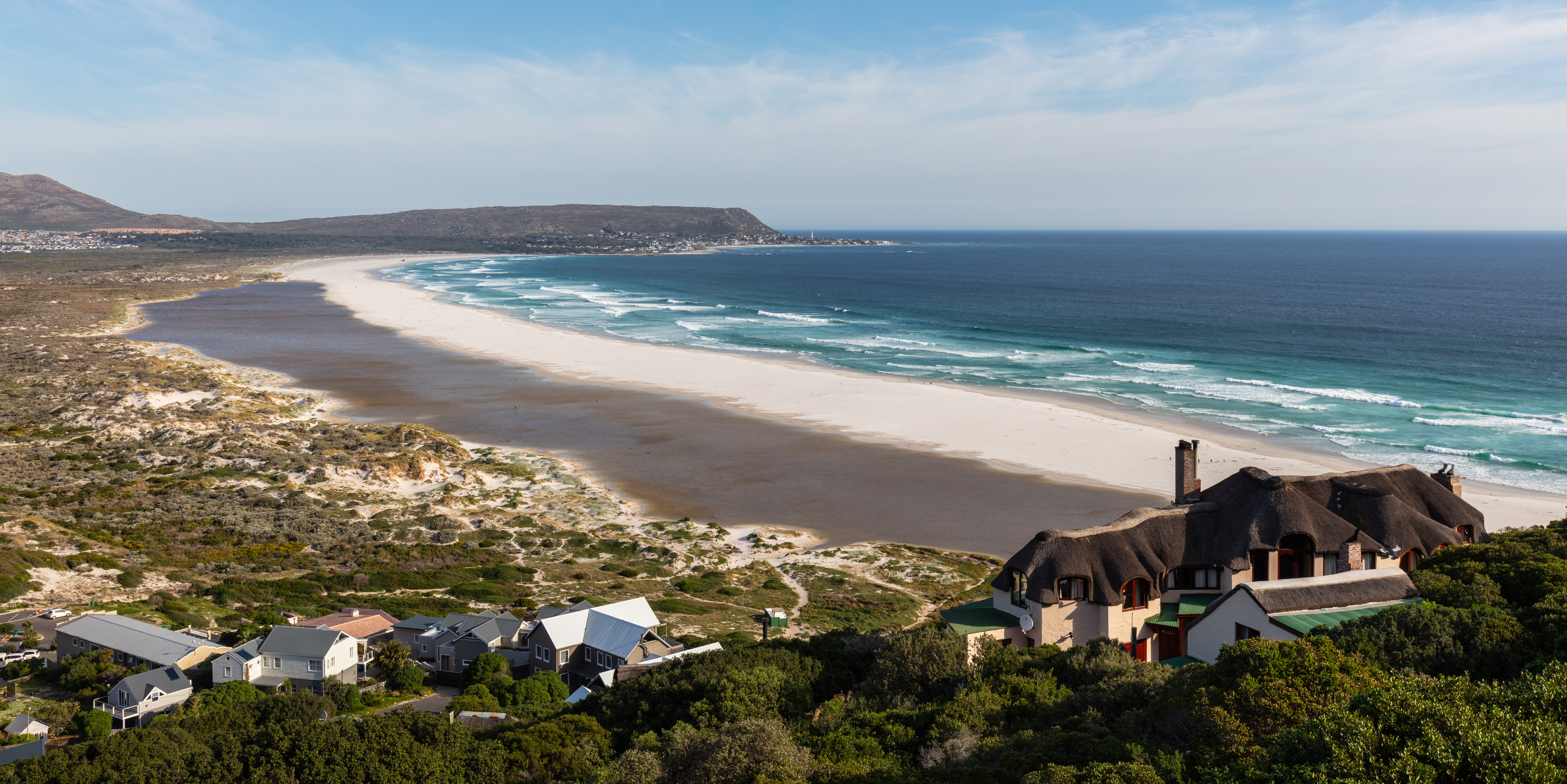
- Noordhoek Beach from Chapman's Peak Drive, with Kommetjie in the distance

- Location within Cape Town Location within Western Cape Location within South Africa
- Coordinates: 34.104°S 18.360°E
- Country: South Africa
- Province: Western Cape
- Municipality: City of Cape Town

Area
  - Total: 29.05 km^{2} (11.22 sq mi)

Population (2011)
  - Total: 31,980
  - Density: 1,101/km^{2} (2,851/sq mi)

Racial makeup (2011)
  - Black African: 67.3%
  - Coloured: 2.3%
  - Indian/Asian: 0.4%
  - White: 24.6%
  - Other: 5.4%

First languages (2011)
  - Xhosa: 47.4%
  - English: 28.5%
  - Afrikaans: 4.8%
  - Sotho: 1.1%
  - Other: 18.2%
- Time zone: UTC+2 (SAST)
- PO box: 7979
- Area code: 021

Noordhoek is a seaside town in the Western Cape, and a suburb of the City of Cape Town, South Africa. It is located below Chapman's Peak on the west coast of the Cape Peninsula, and is approximately 35 kilometres (22 mi) to the south of Cape Town CBD. As a suburb, Noordhoek forms part of the Southern Peninsula region of Cape Town.

The suburb comprises a small community of detached houses, with views overlooking the beach, which runs between Noordhoek and Kommetjie. Noordhoek is well known for its shoreline and its long, wide, sandy beach, which stretches south to neighboring Kommetjie. Both offer ideal surfing locations.

== History ==
The name "Noordhoek" was taken from Dutch and literally means "north corner". It was given this name in 1743 as being the northern corner of the Slangkop farm. The first permanent resident of European origin is Jaco Malan who built his house there.

In 1857, the region was divided into six plots, most of which were bought by a single family, that of the de Villiers. Noordhoek has seen substantial development over the past decades, from a small farming community into a well-established suburb.

In 1900, the steamship Kakapo ran aground near the southern end of Noordhoek Beach, when the captain mistook Chapman's Peak for the Cape of Good Hope and put the helm over to port. Its wreck remains near the beach.

== Geography ==
Noordhoek is situated in the Southern Peninsula of Cape Town. It is surrounded by mostly empty mountainous and coastal land. However, to its south is the suburb of Sun Valley. In the southern part of Noordhoek is the Lake Michelle Eco Estate.

The beach is a 6 km (3.7 mi) stretch of fine white sand backed by Chapman's Peak (592 m (1,942 ft)) and the Table Mountain National Park. Winds are often strong and the sea is cold and wild.

== Transit ==
Noordhoek can be accessed either from the scenic coastal toll road Chapman's Peak Drive, which leads out of Hout Bay or via the mountain road Ou Kaapse Weg which cuts through the Silvermine Nature Reserve - now part of the Table Mountain National Park.

== Housing ==
Housing in Noordhoek consists of mostly detached homes. As of August 2026, the average price of a detached house in the suburb was R10.36 million. However, this is skewed upwards by luxury homes in Crofters Valley, Chapmans Peak, and Lake Michelle, and houses in sub-areas like Milkwood Park are cheaper. In the same month, the average price of a 2-bedroom apartment in Noordhoek was R1.9 million.

== Amenities ==
Noordhoek has a large horse population as riding on the long sandy beach is common. The town consists of a riding stables and a scattering of villas in a wide grassy valley with oak trees. In the middle of this valley is the Noordhoek Farm Village, with craft shops, a playground, café, pub and restaurant.

Nearby malls include Longbeach and Sun Valley malls in Sun Valley.

== Gallery ==
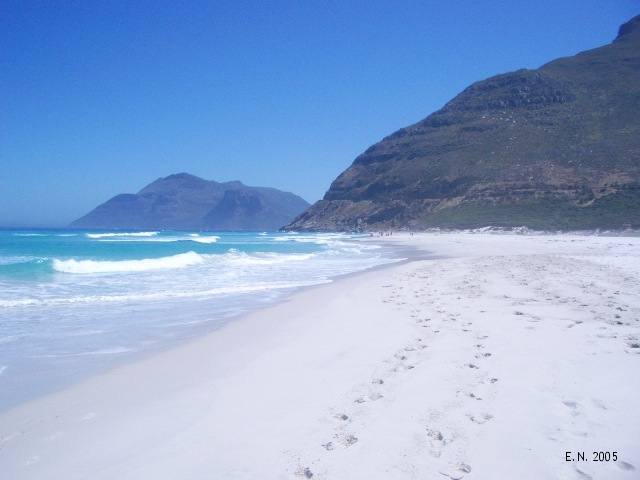
Looking north along the beach. The slopes of Chapman's Peak rise to the right at the end of the sand. The peak in the distance is Karbonkelberg, west of Hout Bay

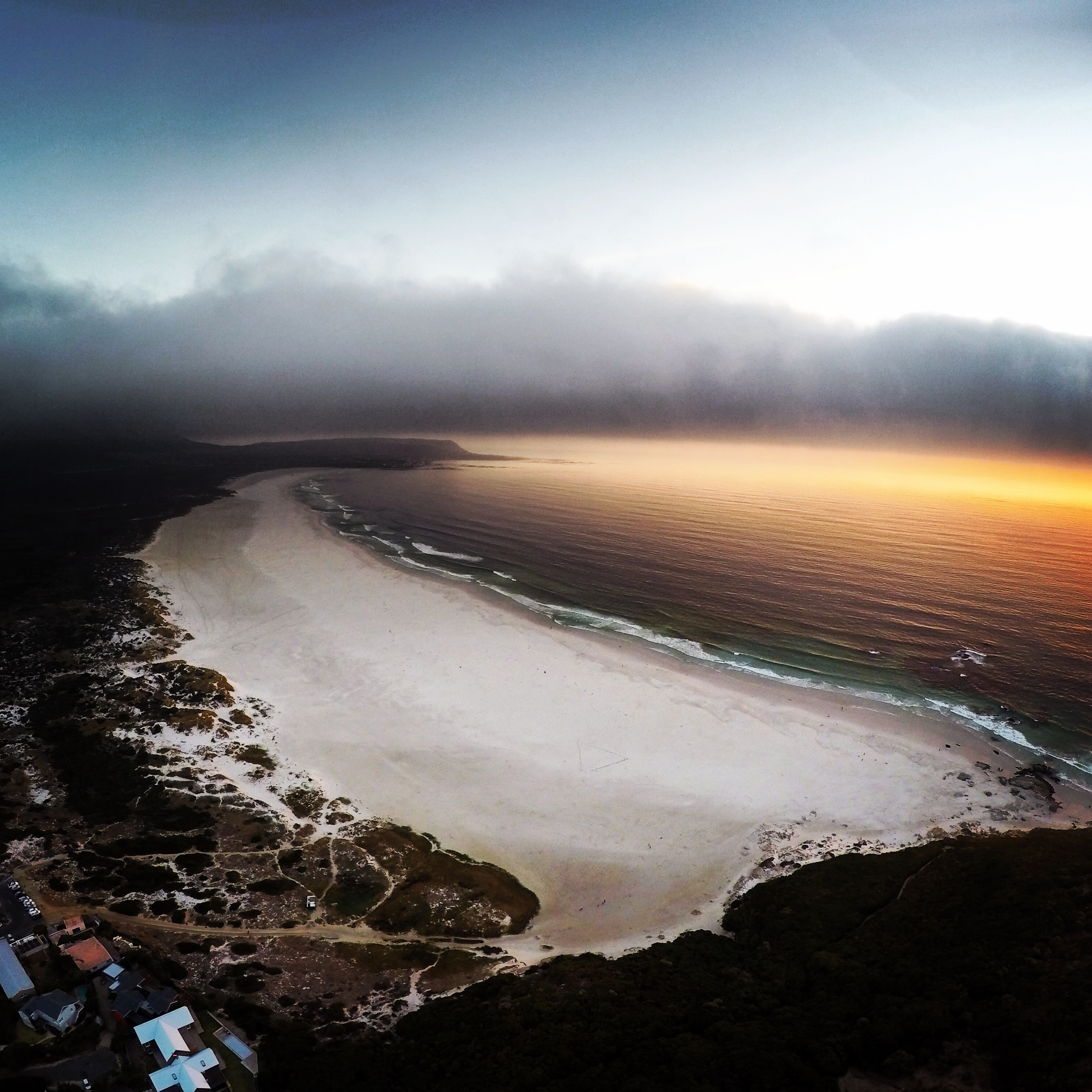
An evening flight over Noordhoek Beach, with Kommetjie in the distance

== See also ==
- Southern Peninsula, Cape Town
