= Sun Valley, Cape Town =

Suburb of Cape Town, in Western Cape, South Africa

Sun Valley
- Location in Greater Cape Town
- Coordinates: 34°7′31″S 18°23′47″E
- Country: South Africa
- Province: Western Cape

Area
  - Total: 1.21 km^{2} (0.47 sq mi)

Population (2011)
  - Total: 2,278

Racial makeup (2011)
  - Black African: 6%
  - Coloured: 5%
  - Indian/Asian: 0.83%
  - White: 86%
  - Other: 2.68%

First languages (2011)
  - English: 84%
  - Afrikaans: 13%
  - IsiXhosa: 0.35%
  - Other: 1.93%
- Time zone: UTC+2 (SAST)

Sun Valley is a suburb in Cape Town under the City of Cape Town Metropolitan Municipality in the Western Cape province of South Africa. According to the 2001 census, Sun Valley had a population of 2,024.
