= Waterworks Museum (Cape Town) =

South African museum

Coordinates: 33°58′30″S 18°24′27″E

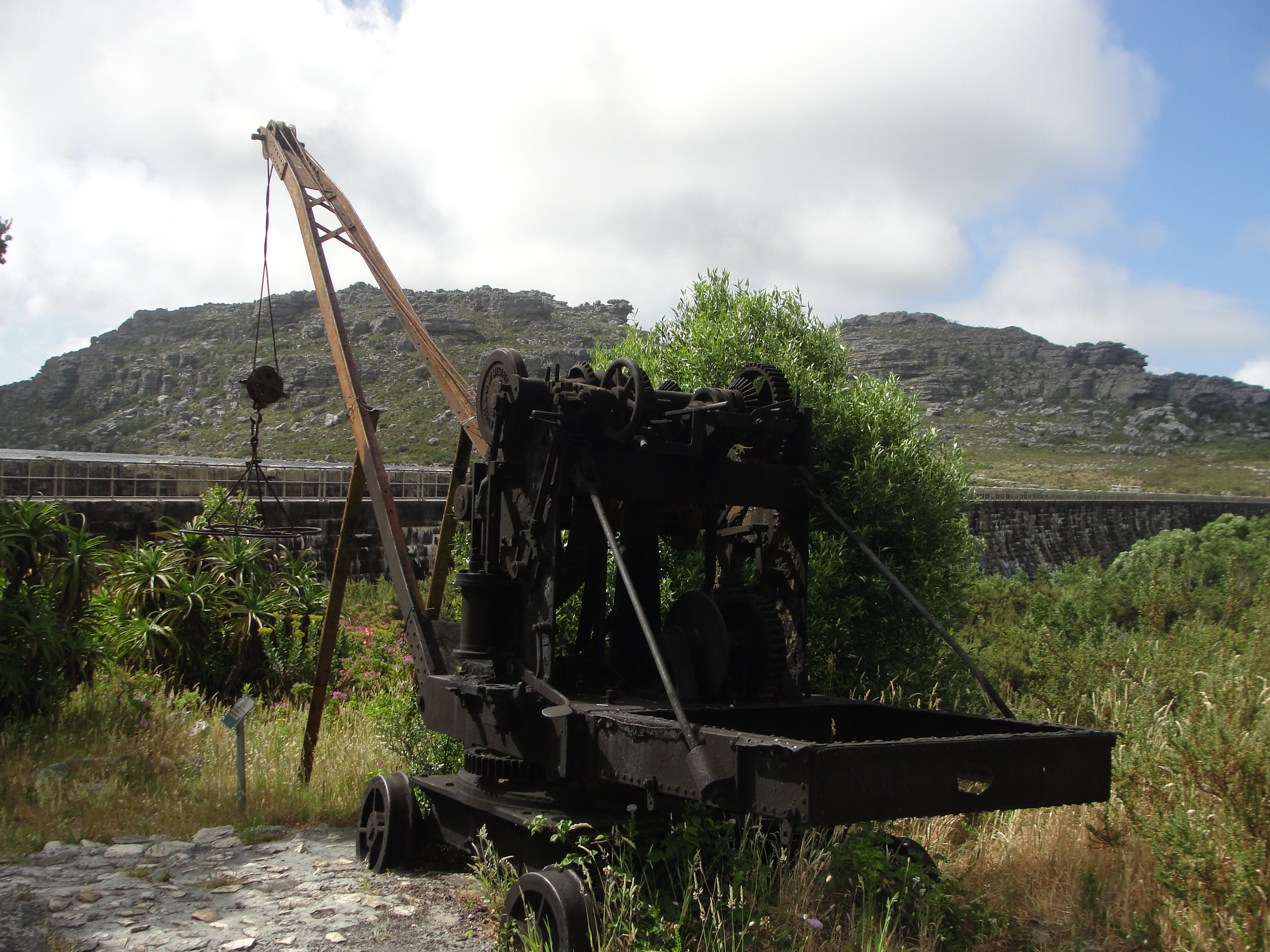
Crane outside the Waterworks Museum

The Waterworks Museum is located on the northern side of Table Mountain, between the Woodhead and Hely-Hutchinson Reservoirs, in Cape Town, South Africa. The museum was founded in 1972 by Terence Timoney, a retired waterworks engineer. The museum houses a display of memorabilia from the construction of the dams on Table Mountain which include a restored narrow gauge steam engine. It has an interesting display of original equipment, hand tools, instruments and photographs and includes the original well-preserved steam locomotive used to haul equipment from the old cableway at Kasteelspoort.
