= Miller's Point, Western Cape =

Miller's Point
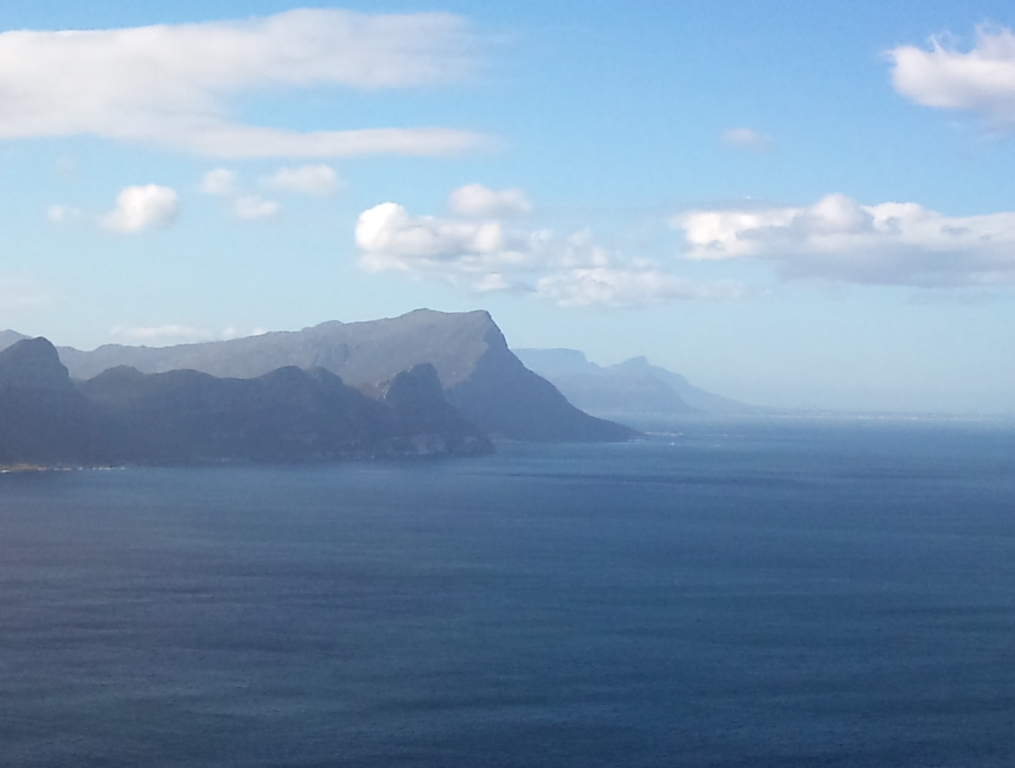
- View of Miller's Point from the south

- Location within Western Cape
- Coordinates: 34°13′51.6″S 18°28′26.4″E
- Country: South Africa
- Province: Western Cape
- Metropolitan municipality: City of Cape Town
- Time zone: UTC+2 (SAST)

Miller's Point is a headland and stretch of protected coastline in South Africa. It is located about 4 kilometres (2.5 mi) south of Simon's Town on the road to Cape Point.

== History ==
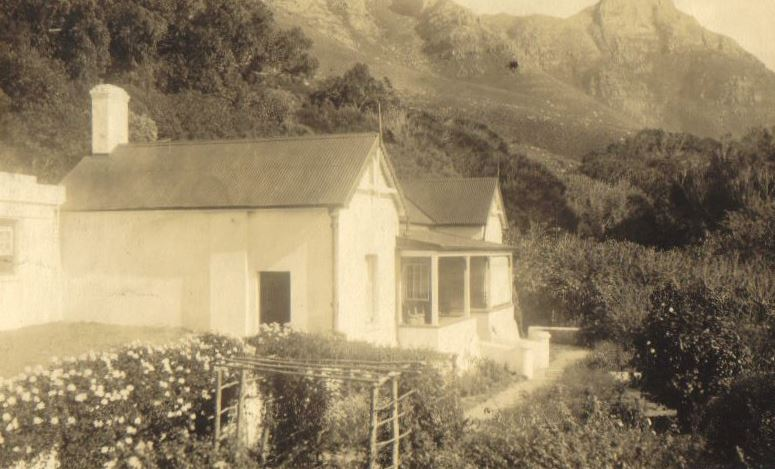
Old image probably of a section of the Molteno family's retreat in Millers Point, c 1920s

Miller's Point got its name when the land was sold to Edmund Miller in 1825, who developed it as a whaling station. However the whaling operations were stopped in the 1850s and, for almost a century, the coast remained unused apart from occasional fishermen.

In the 1920s, the land was bought by the Molteno family of Cape Town who used it as a family retreat and closed it off from public access. In 1961, the Moltenos donated the land to the city for conservation. The land has now been integrated into the Table Mountain National Park and the family's manor is now a restaurant complex.

== Current Use ==
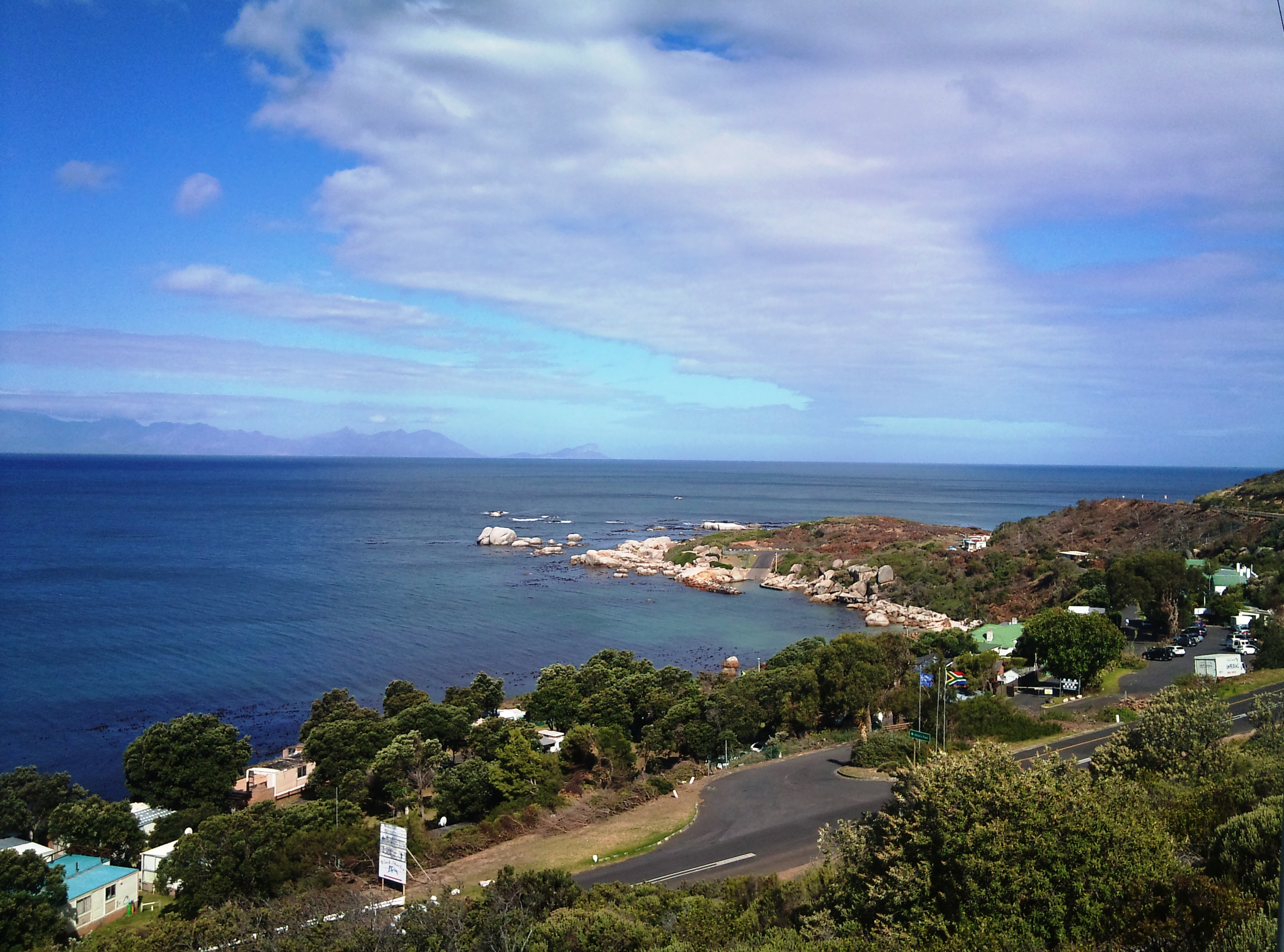
Restaurant complex at the site of the old manor on the Millers Point coast

The area around the former manor is now a recreational area, and a portion of the land is leased to the Cape Boat and Ski-boat Club. The rest of the property (extending from the Swartberg Mountains down to the False Bay coast) is now a nature reserve, with some provision for holiday accommodation. The headland has repeatedly been under consideration for a lighthouse, however none has been built to date. The point itself has two beaches, several sheltered coves and tidal pools.

=== Whale watching ===
This is a popular spot for whale watching, especially from early July to November. There are two deep pools, just to the north of the point, where the whales are able to come in close to the shore and can often be seen breaching. Southern right whales are most common and come here in the spring with their calves. Other whales, as well as dolphins, can sometimes be seen too. The beaches are sheltered from the wind and there are panoramic views of False Bay from further up the slopes.

=== Public access for boating ===
The slipways of Miller's Point are the only public access slipways on this part of the False Bay coastline, and they are much used by recreational and commercial fishermen.

=== Shipwrecks ===
Miller's Point has become a popular launching site for wreck diving trips, as well as dives on the nearby reefs. Two frigates, two fishing boats and an offshore mining vessel were scuttled in Smitswinkel Bay by the Navy in the early 1970s, to form an artificial reef which has proved to be a success. These ships now sit upright on the sea bed, about 4 km from the launching point. In addition, the SAS Pietermaritzburg, formerly HMS Pelorus (which led the D-Day invasions of Normandy) was scuttled in shallow water (20m) just off Miller's Point and the Portuguese liner Lusitania (which lies in deeper water at Bellows Rock near Cape Point after running aground there in 1911) is also most conveniently accessible from Miller's Point launches.

=== Water sports ===
Miller's Point is a popular site for sea kayaking, surf skiing, shore-entry scuba diving, spear-fishing and yachting.

== Flora and fauna ==
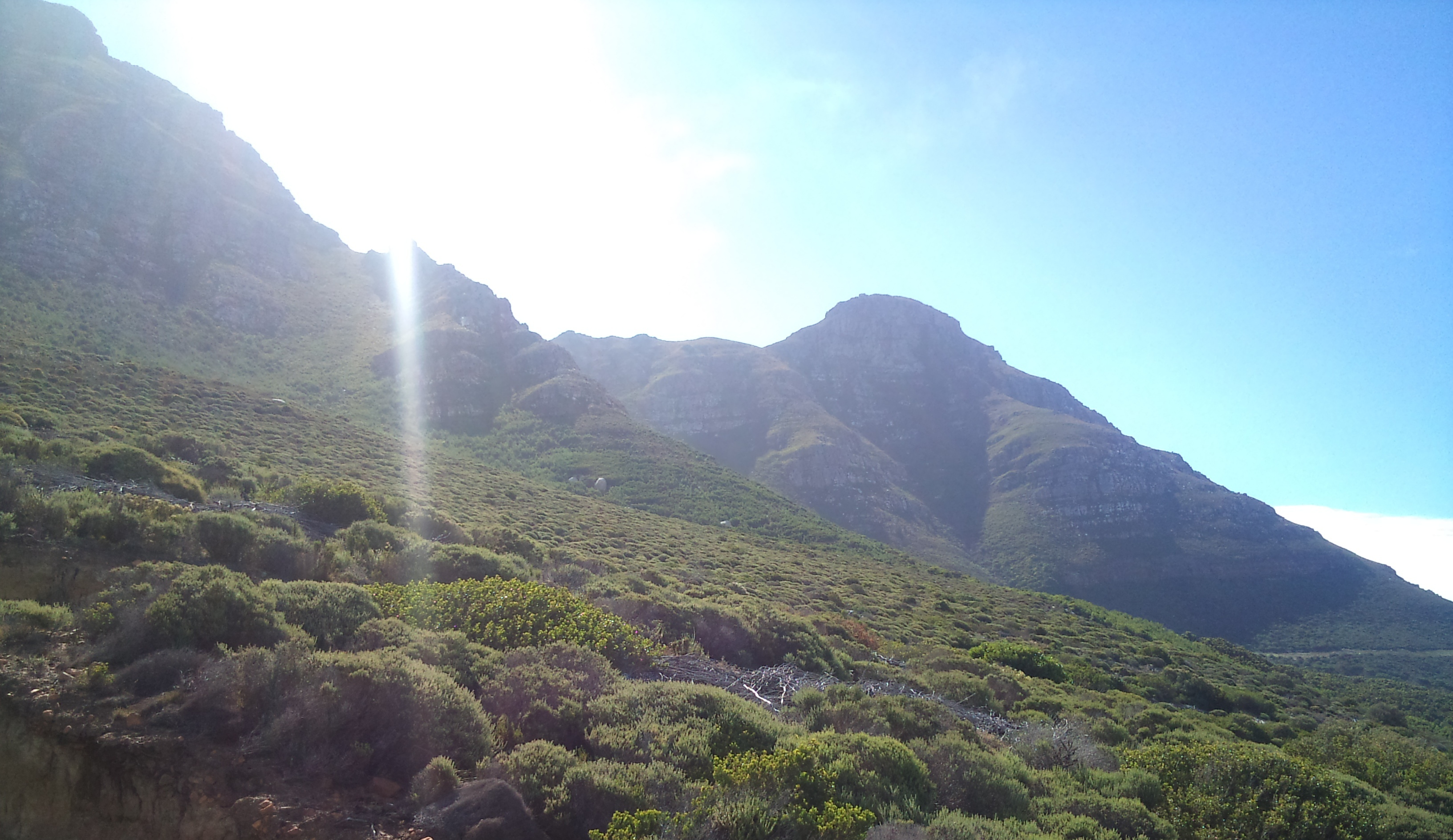
Peninsula Sandstone Fynbos on the mountain slopes of Miller's Point

The main indigenous ecosystem of the area is Peninsula Granite Fynbos, a critically endangered vegetation-type that occurs nowhere else in the world. Mature Granite Fynbos is dominated by large tree-Proteas, such as the tree pincushion-protea and the waboom, and a dense under-layer of asteraceous (daisy) species. There are a variety of species (some already extinct) which are naturally restricted to this specific vegetation type, occurring nowhere else in the world. The primary threat to this ecosystem is invasive alien plants, such as the Australian Port Jackson and rooikrans acacias.

Peninsula Sandstone Fynbos, a less severely endangered vegetation-type with a different range of species, can be found on the higher slopes, including a vast number of endemics. This tiny ecosystem (restricted to the upper slopes of Cape Peninsula mountains) has an extraordinarily rich biodiversity, with roughly the same number of plant species as can be found in the whole of the United Kingdom.

Since being established as a marine sanctuary, inshore fishing has been prohibited and the rocky coastline has recovered its abundant marine life. This plentiful sea life has made the point an attraction for recreational scuba divers. A sheltered cove at Miller's Point is one of the largest known aggregation sites for broadnose sevengill sharks.
