= Singafrotypa mandela =

Mandela's Orb-Web Spider

Conservation status
- Least Concern (SANBI Red List)

Scientific classification
- Kingdom: Animalia
- Phylum: Arthropoda
- Subphylum: Chelicerata
- Class: Arachnida
- Order: Araneae
- Infraorder: Araneomorphae
- Family: Araneidae
- Genus: Singafrotypa
- Species: S. mandela

Binomial name
- Singafrotypa mandela Kuntner & Hormiga, 2002

Species of spider

Singafrotypa mandela is a species of spider in the family Araneidae. It is a South African endemic commonly known as Mandela's orb-web spider.

== Distribution ==
Singafrotypa mandela is endemic to South Africa. It has been recorded from KwaZulu-Natal, Limpopo, and Western Cape.

== Habitat and ecology ==
The species inhabits altitudes ranging from 9 to 1,148 m above sea level and has been sampled from the Fynbos and Savanna biomes. The natural history of Singafrotypa mandela is unknown, though its cylindrical body with advanced spinnerets might suggest utilization of rolled leaves or grass stems as a retreat on the web.

== Conservation ==
Singafrotypa mandela is listed as Least Concern by the South African National Biodiversity Institute. The species is probably under collected and is suspected to occur in more localities. It is protected in Mkuze Game Reserve and Table Mountain National Park.

== Etymology ==
This species is named in honor of Nelson Mandela.

== Taxonomy ==
The species was originally described by Kuntner & Hormiga in 2002 from Cape Town. The species is known only from females.
