= Miller's Point =

Miller's Point may refer to:

- Miller Point, in Antarctica
- Millers Point, New South Wales
- Miller's Point, Western Cape
