= Zelotes broomi =

Stellenbosch Dark Ground Spider

Conservation status
- Least Concern (SANBI Red List)

Scientific classification
- Kingdom: Animalia
- Phylum: Arthropoda
- Subphylum: Chelicerata
- Class: Arachnida
- Order: Araneae
- Infraorder: Araneomorphae
- Family: Gnaphosidae
- Genus: Zelotes
- Species: Z. broomi

Binomial name
- Zelotes broomi (Purcell, 1907)

Synonyms
- Melanophora broomi Purcell, 1907

Species of spider

Zelotes broomi is a species of spider in the family Gnaphosidae. It is commonly known as the Stellenbosch dark ground spider.

== Distribution ==
Zelotes broomi is endemic to the Western Cape of South Africa. It is known from several localities throughout the province, at altitudes ranging from 32 to 1,502 m above sea level.

Notable locations include the type locality of Stellenbosch, Table Mountain National Park, and Cederberg Wilderness Area.

== Habitat and ecology ==
The species inhabits the Fynbos and Succulent Karoo biomes. These are free-running spiders that are found under stones during the day.

== Conservation ==
Zelotes broomi is listed as Least Concern by the South African National Biodiversity Institute due to its wide geographic range. There are no significant threats to the species. It is protected in Table Mountain National Park and Cederberg Wilderness Area.

== Taxonomy ==
The species was originally described by Purcell in 1907 from Stellenbosch as Melanophora broomi. It was revised by FitzPatrick in 2007. The species is known from both sexes.
