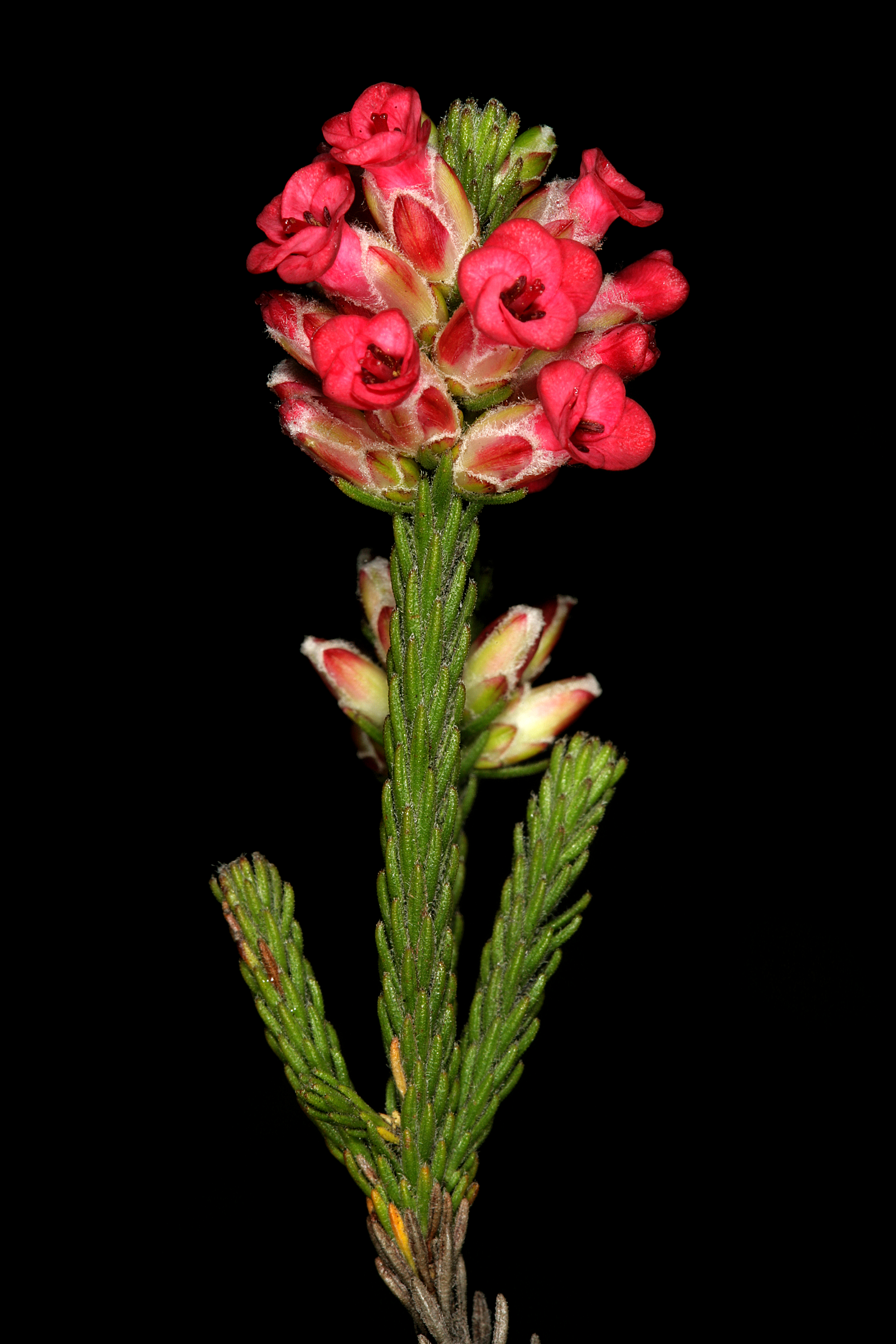

Scientific classification
- Kingdom: Plantae
- Clade: Tracheophytes
- Clade: Angiosperms
- Clade: Eudicots
- Clade: Asterids
- Order: Bruniales
- Family: Bruniaceae
- Genus: Audouinia
- Species: A. capitata

Binomial name
- Audouinia capitata (L.) Brongn.

Synonyms
- Diosma capitata L.; Pavinda capensis Retz. ex Steud.

= Audouinia capitata =

Species of plant

Audouinia capitata is a perennial shrub that is part of the Audouinia genus. The plant is endemic to the Western Cape and occurs from Cape Point to Caledon. The species and is part of the fynbos and is considered rare.
