= Coleophora elegans =

Scientific classification
- Kingdom: Animalia
- Phylum: Arthropoda
- Clade: Pancrustacea
- Class: Insecta
- Order: Lepidoptera
- Family: Coleophoridae
- Genus: Coleophora
- Species: C. elegans

Binomial name
- Coleophora elegans Baldizzone & van der Wolf, 2015

Species of moth

Coleophora elegans is a species of moth in the family Coleophoridae. It is found in South Africa, where it has been recorded from the Western Cape and Northern Cape. The type locality is Cape of Good Hope Nature Reserve.
