= Singafrotypa =

Scientific classification
- Kingdom: Animalia
- Phylum: Arthropoda
- Subphylum: Chelicerata
- Class: Arachnida
- Order: Araneae
- Infraorder: Araneomorphae
- Family: Araneidae
- Genus: Singafrotypa; Benoit, 1962

Type species
- S. acanthopus (Simon, 1907)

Species
- 4, see text

Genus of spiders

Singafrotypa is an African genus of orb-weaver spiders first described by Pierre L.G. Benoit in 1962.

== Distribution ==
Two species are endemic to southern Africa, with one species present in West to Central Africa, and another in Ethiopia.

=== Description ===
Males are unknown. Females range from 9–10 mm in total length. They have an elongated abdomen with parallel sides that overhang the spinnerets. The carapace is dark brown with a wide cephalic region and widely separated median and lateral eyes. The sternum is dark brown and longer than wide. The abdomen is elongate and cylindrical, longer than wide, and caudally overhangs the spinnerets.

=== Lifestyle ===
Nothing is known about their behaviour, though some specimens were sampled while sweeping grass.

== Species ==
As of September 2025, this genus includes four species:

- Singafrotypa acanthopus (Simon, 1907) – Ivory Coast, Equatorial Guinea (Bioko), DR Congo (type species)
- Singafrotypa mandela Kuntner & Hormiga, 2002 – South Africa
- Singafrotypa okavango Kuntner & Hormiga, 2002 – Botswana
- Singafrotypa subinermis (Caporiacco, 1940) – Ethiopia
