= Flying Dutchman Funicular =

Funicular railway at Cape Point, South Africa

Coordinates: 34.351692°S 18.487051°E

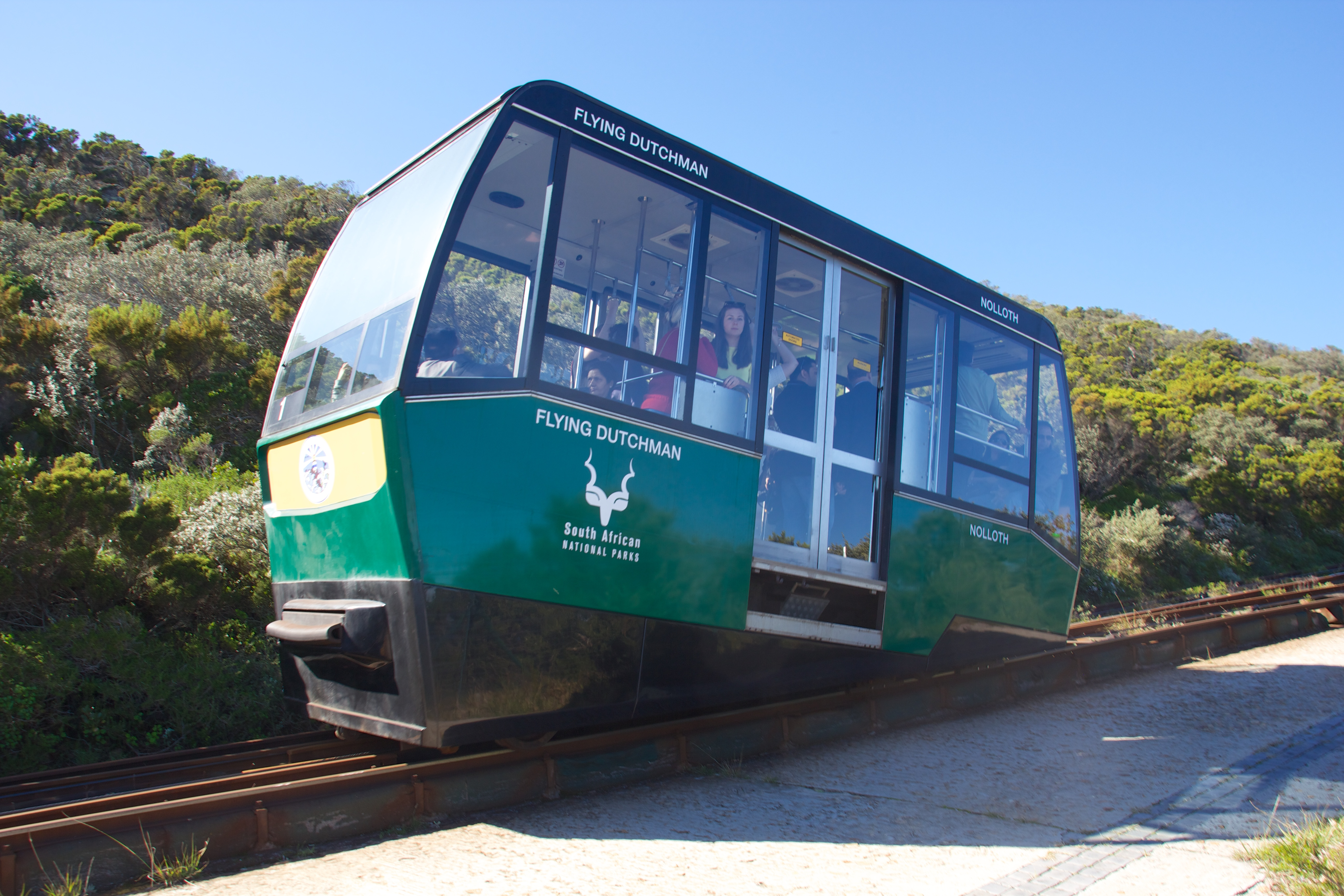

Overview
- Locale: Cape Point (City of Cape Town Metropolitan Municipality), Western Cape, South Africa
- Termini: Cape Point parking are; Cape Point Upper lighthouse
- Stations: 2

Service
- Type: Funicular

History
- Opened: 1996

Technical
- Line length: 585 m (1,919 ft)
- Maximum incline: 16%

The Flying Dutchman Funicular, also known as the Cape Point Funicular, is a funicular railway located at Cape Point, near the Cape of Good Hope in the Western Cape province of South Africa. The line runs from a lower station at the Cape Point car park, up an incline through dense fynbos to the upper lighthouse. It was the first commercial funicular of its kind in Africa, and takes its name from the legend of the Flying Dutchman ghost ship.

== History ==
The route that the line follows was originally serviced by a 16-seater Flying Dutchman bus. Due to the increasing number of visitors to the Cape, Cape Metropolitan Council put out a call for proposals to replace the bus service in early 1995. The proposal by Concor to install an electrically powered funicular was accepted as an environmentally friendly and novel means of transport. It was the first commercial funicular railway of its kind in Africa, and was produced entirely using South African resources. The diesel bus ran the route for the last time in December 1996, after which time the funicular replaced it. The funicular cars were refurbished in June 2010.

The name of the line comes from the legend of the Flying Dutchman ghost ship.

== Route ==
The funicular has two stops: it runs between the Cape Point parking area and the viewing point below the lighthouse. The line follows the line of the road previously used by the bus to minimise the environmental impact; due to the width of that road, the funicular has a Single track with a passing loop at the midway point. The track is 585 metres (1,919 ft) long, and rises 87 metres (285 ft) from the lower station (at 127 metres (417 ft) above sea level) to the upper station (at 214 metres (702 ft) above sea level), with a maximum gradient of 16%. The route travels through dense fynbos.

The two cars on the line are drawn along the track using ropes, and is powered by electricity. Each car can carry 40 passengers for a journey that lasts around 3 minutes. The overall capacity of the line is around 450 passengers per hour. The cars are named "Nolloth" and "Thomas T. Tucker" after vessels that sank in the area.

The funicular is suitable for wheelchairs. The route can also be walked. It runs from 09.00 until 17.00 each day (17.30 between October and March). As of 2015, a return journey on the funicular costs R55 (Adult) or R23 (Children and pensioners), and is free for children under the age of 6.

== See also ==
- List of funicular railways
