= SS Lusitania (1906) =

Twin screw steel steamship wrecked near Cape Point in 1911

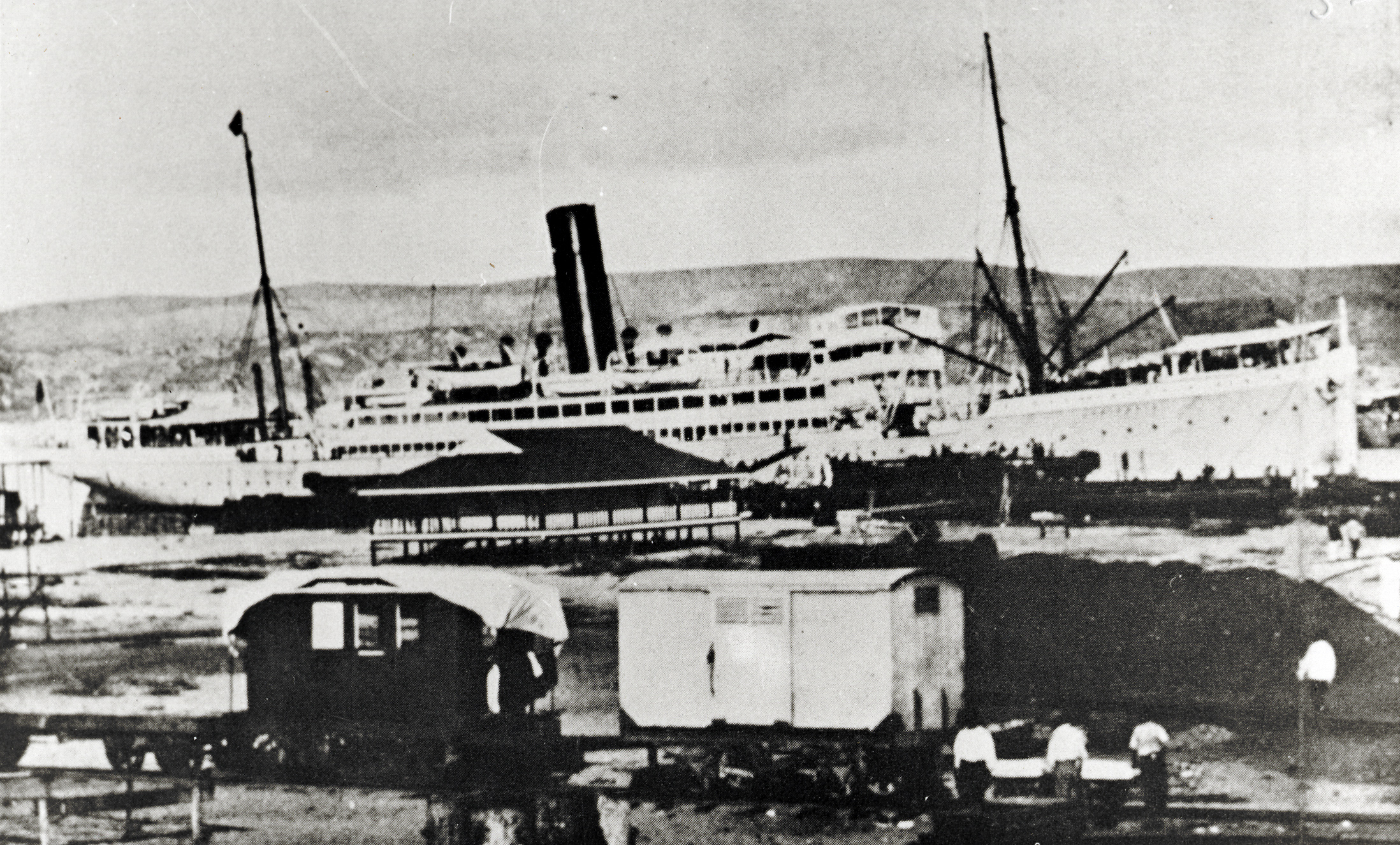

History
- Name: SS Lusitania
- Owner: Empresa Nacional de Navegação
- Builder: Sir Raylton Dixon & Company, Middlesbrough
- Yard number: 519
- Launched: 12 February 1906
- Fate: Wrecked on 18 April 1911

General characteristics
- Tonnage: 5,557 GRT
- Length: 421 ft (128 m)
- Beam: 51 ft (16 m)
- Draught: 20 ft (6.1 m)
- Installed power: 754 nominal horsepower
- Propulsion: Triple-expansion steam engines; Twin shafts; Four scotch boilers
- Speed: 14 knots (26 km/h; 16 mph)

SS Lusitania was a Portuguese twin-screw ocean liner of 5,557 tons, built in 1906 by Sir Raylton Dixon & Co, and owned by Empresa Nacional de Navegação, of Lisbon.

The ship was wrecked on Bellows Rock off Cape Point, South Africa at 24h00 on 18 April 1911 in fog while en route from Lourenço Marques (now Maputo), Mozambique, with 25 first-class, 57 second-class and 121 third-class passengers, and 475 African labourers. Out of the 774 people on board, eight died when a life boat capsized. On 20 April the ship slipped off the rock into 37 metres (121 ft) of water to the east of the rock. The wreck has become a fairly well known recreational dive site, but at 33 to 40 metres, it is deeper than recommended for the average recreational diver, and the currents and breakers over the reef make it a moderately challenging dive.

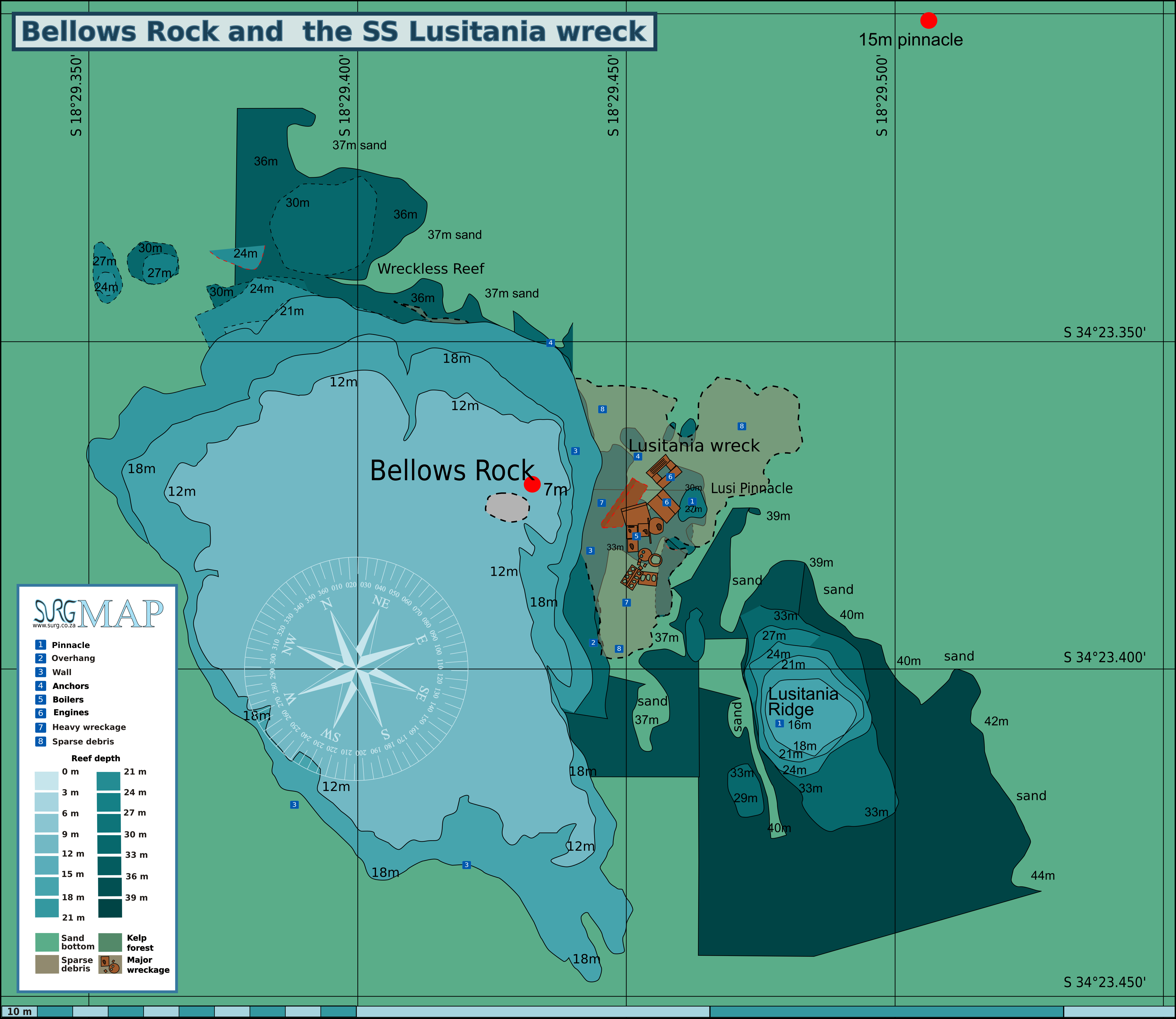
Map of the wreck site of SS Lusitania

The sinking of Lusitania spurred the local authorities to construct a new lighthouse on the Cape Point.

== See also ==
- Shipwrecks of Cape Town
