= Peninsula Sandstone Fynbos =

Vegetation type endemic to the Cape Peninsula in Cape Town, South Africa

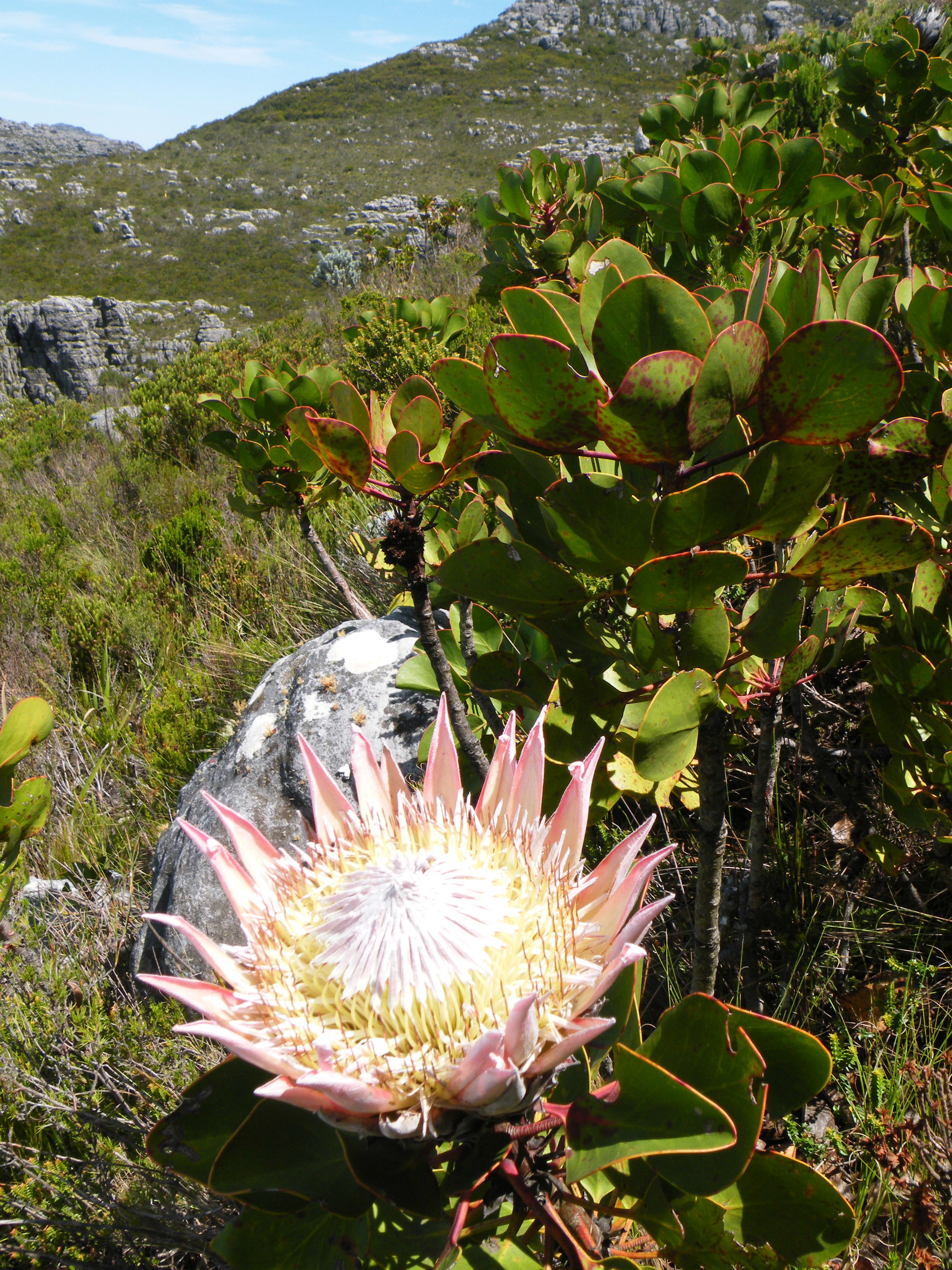
Protea cynaroides growing in Peninsula Sandstone Fynbos on the Cape Peninsula.

Peninsula Sandstone Fynbos is a unique and endangered vegetation type that is endemic to the Cape Peninsula in Cape Town. This type of Mountain Fynbos occurs on very poor, acidic soils but is incredibly rich in biodiversity with an enormous number of plant species – many of which occur nowhere else. Due to its poor soils and steep, inaccessible location, it has not been developed for farming or houses, and consequently it is relatively well conserved.

== Description ==
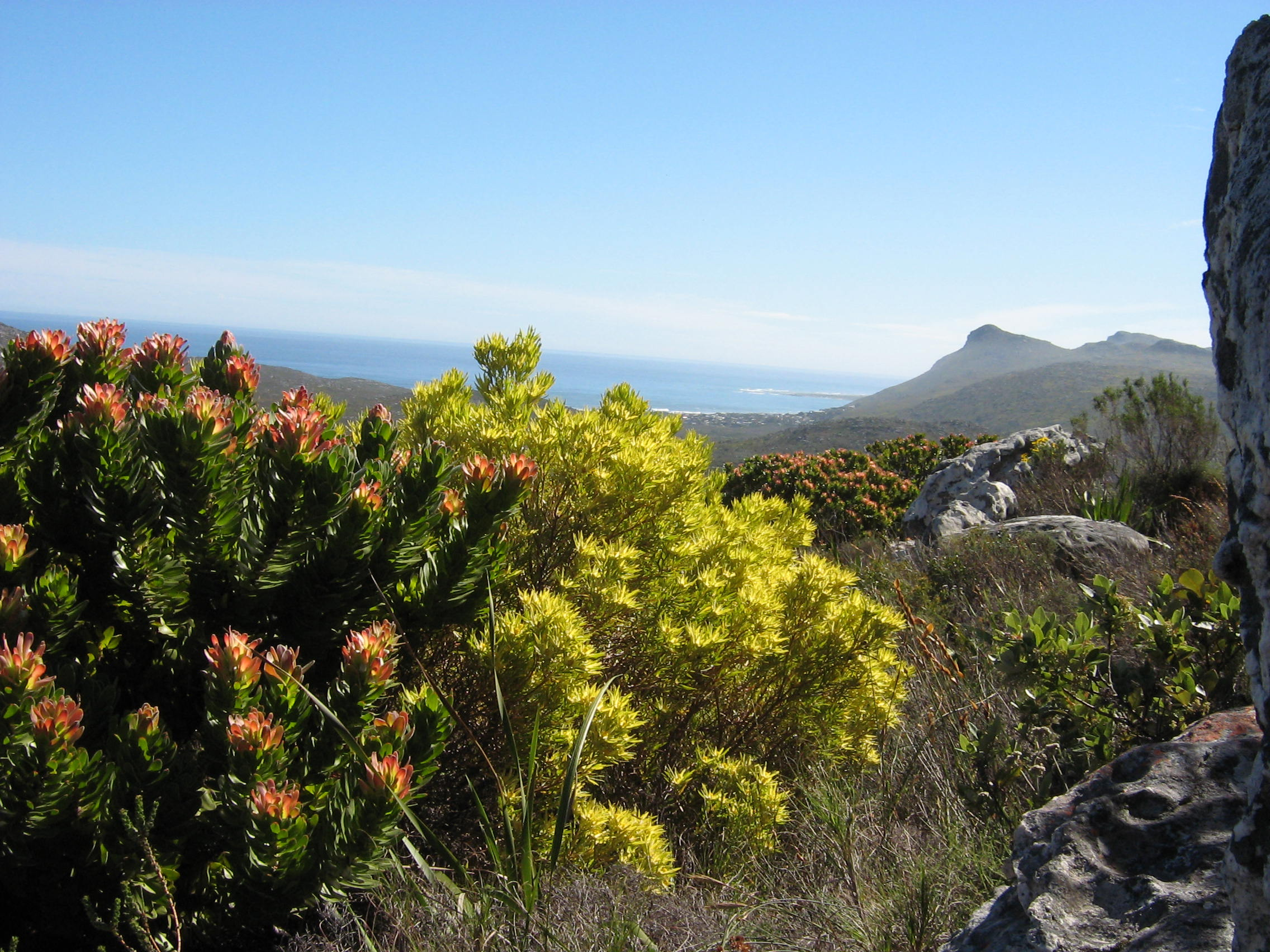
Typical Peninsula Sandstone Fynbos growing in Table Mountain National Park, Cape Town.

The plant life is a special kind of Fynbos, containing a vast mix of species from all of the principal components of Fynbos vegetation. A great many of these species are endemic and can be found nowhere else in the world, including around 33 endemic Ericas. (There is even a unique species of aloe, the Table Mountain Aloe, which is also endemic to Table Mountain's Peninsula Sandstone Fynbos.) The variety of tall Protea species are particularly striking and noticeable and are especially common growing in the rough sands of wetter spots. In lower areas that are wetter still, Restios become dominant, while a wide range of Erica species predominate on the better-drained slopes. Asteraceous (Daisy) species are more common in steeper, drier spots and succulent plants occur on the steepest cliff faces. In areas which are protected from seasonal fires, such as river valleys, the Fynbos is replaced by dense, indigenous Afrotemperate forest.

== Natural distribution ==
This is the predominant vegetation type of the higher parts of the Cape Peninsula, from the face of Table Mountain in the north, southwards as far as Cape Point. It is the main ecosystem of the upper slopes of Table Mountain (and a tiny pocket of it is found on the very top of Lions Head), but it is low-lying in the southern parts of the peninsula, often even occurring at sea level. Overall it corresponds closely with the rocky, acid sands of Table Mountain Sandstone.

== Threats and conservation ==
Most Peninsula Sandstone Fynbos still remains (98%), mainly due to its steep, inaccessible location and its poor soils, which together make it unsuitable both for housing and for farming. The attempt to establish successful commercial pine plantations failed due to the poor soil quality; the plantations have mostly been removed. The main threats to this ecosystem today come from invasive alien plants such as wattles (mostly Port Jackson and Rooikrans wattle), hakeas and pine trees. Another problem is human disturbance of the ecosystem’s natural cycle of fires.

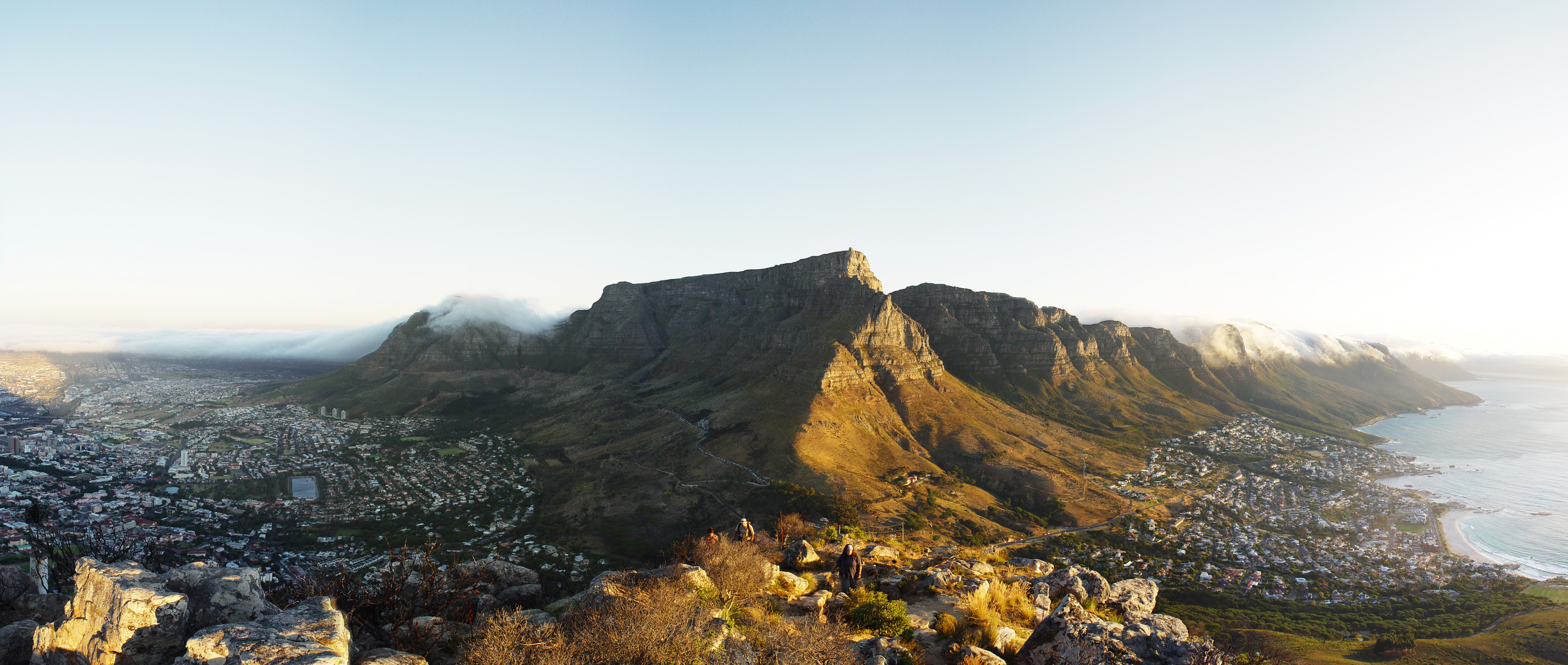
Peninsula Sandstone Fynbos is restricted to Table Mountain and the Cape Peninsula.

About 79% of this vegetation type is statutorily protected, due to its lying within the Table Mountain National Park and it is largely well preserved. However it is nonetheless classified as endangered due to its very large number of threatened Red List species.

For such a tiny ecosystem it has an extraordinarily rich biodiversity, having roughly the same number of plant species as can be found in the whole of the United Kingdom.

== See also ==
- Biodiversity of Cape Town
- Cape Floristic Region
- Peninsula Granite Fynbos
- Table Mountain
- Table Mountain National Park
- Category:Fynbos – habitats and species.
