= Cape Point =

Headland in the Western Cape, South Africa

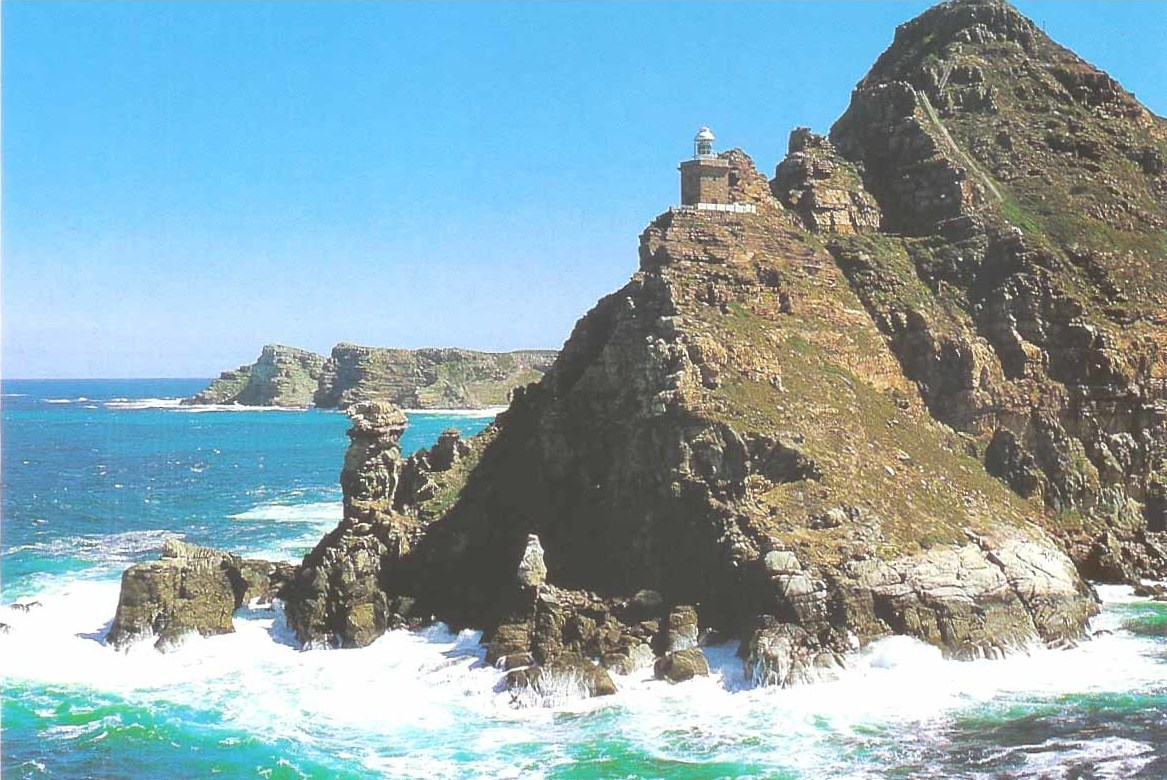
Cape Point in the left foreground, with the Cape of Good Hope almost right behind and some 2.3 km away

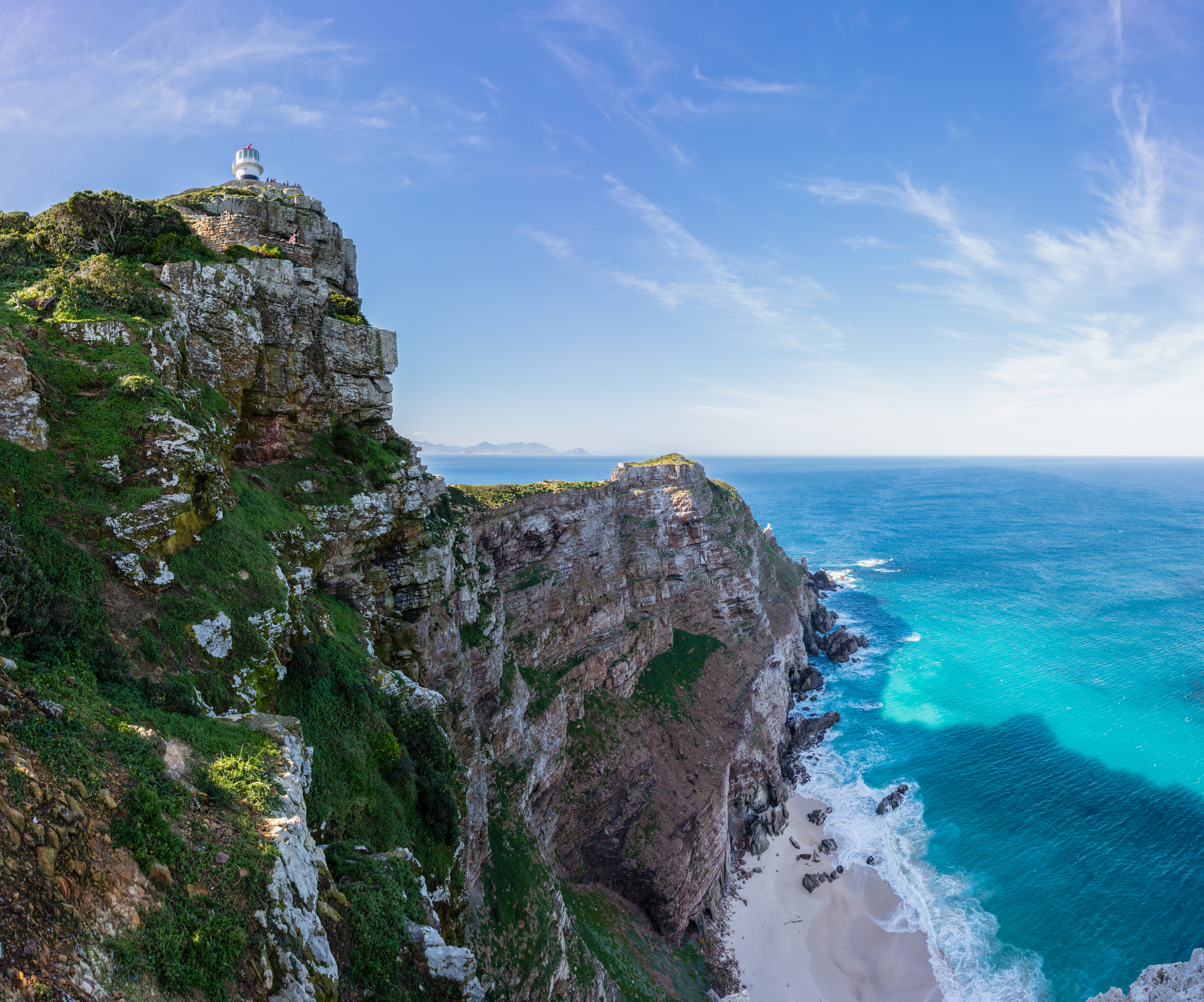
Looking from behind the old lighthouse (at top left) to the new lighthouse (a sunlit speck of white very near the point). The lighthouses are 700 metres (2,300 ft) apart, and the new lighthouse 162 metres (531 ft) lower in altitude to remain visible during low cloud.

Cape Point (Afrikaans: Kaappunt) is a promontory at the southeast corner of the Cape Peninsula, a mountainous and scenic landform that runs north–south for about thirty kilometres (19 mi) at the extreme southwestern tip of the African continent in South Africa. Table Mountain and the city of Cape Town are close to the northern extremity of the same peninsula. The cape is located at 34°21′26″S 18°29′51″E, about 2.3 kilometres (1.4 mi) east and a little north of the Cape of Good Hope on the southwest corner. Although these two rocky capes are very well known, neither cape is actually the southernmost point of the mainland of Africa; that is Cape Agulhas, approximately 150 kilometres (93 mi) to the east-southeast.

== Peaks ==
The peak above Cape Point is higher than that above the Cape of Good Hope. The rugged sandstone (Table Mountain sandstone) ridge that rises from Cape Point at sea level develops into two peaks. There is a major peak that dominates the skyline locally, but there is also a smaller peak about 100 m (328 ft) further south. The higher peak has the old lighthouse on the top. The Flying Dutchman Funicular runs from a car park to the north up to slightly below the level of the old lighthouse, and a short flight of steps leads to a viewing platform around the base of the lighthouse. From the end of the railway, a second path leads to a lower peak.

== Lighthouse ==
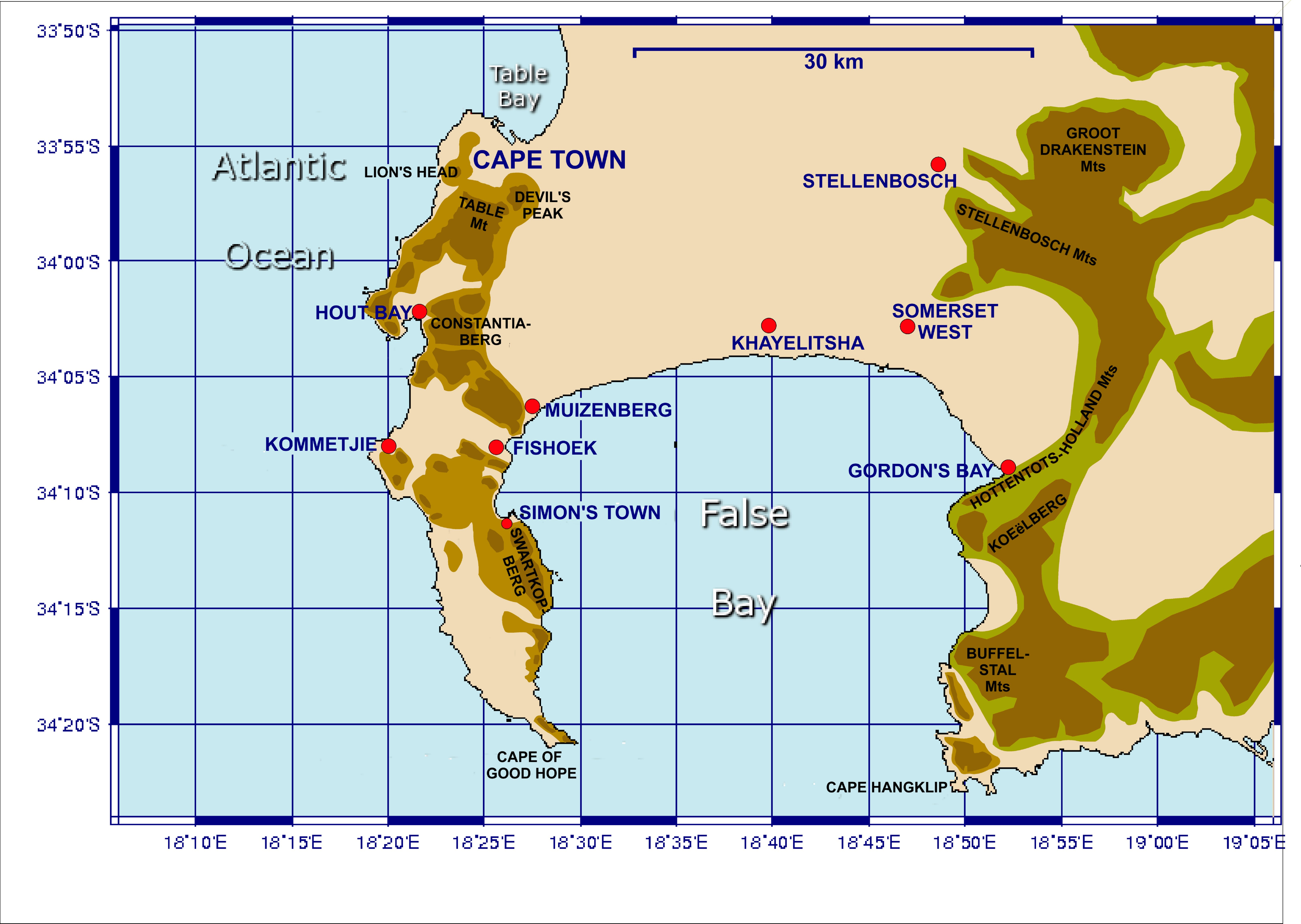
A map of the Cape Peninsula showing its major features. Cape Point is the small cape jutting out towards the east from The Cape of Good Hope at the southern end of the Peninsula. The lighthouse is on Cape Point, rather than on the Cape of Good Hope to the west.

The new lighthouse is at a lower elevation (87 meters; 285.5 feet above sea level), for two reasons: the old lighthouse, located at 34°21′12″S 18°29′25.2″E (262 meters; 859.6 feet above sea level), could be seen 'too early' by ships rounding the point towards the east, causing them to approach too closely. Secondly, foggy conditions often prevail at the higher levels, making the older lighthouse invisible to shipping. On 18 April 1911, the Portuguese liner Lusitania was wrecked just south of Cape Point at 34°23′22″S 18°29′23″E on Bellows Rock for precisely this reason, prompting the relocation of the lighthouse.

The new lighthouse, located at 34°21′26″S 18°29′49″E, cannot be seen from the West until ships are at a safe distance to the South. The light of the new Cape Point lighthouse is the most powerful on the South African coast, with a range of 63 kilometres (39 mi; 34 nmi) and an intensity of 10 megacandelas in each flash.

== Table Mountain National Park ==
Cape Point is situated within the Table Mountain National Park, in a section of the park known as the Cape of Good Hope. This section covers the southern tip of the Cape Peninsula, which takes in perhaps 20% of its total area. The Cape of Good Hope section of the park is generally wild, unspoiled, and undeveloped, and is an important haven for seabirds. The vegetation at Cape Point consists primarily of Peninsula Sandstone Fynbos.

== Ocean currents ==
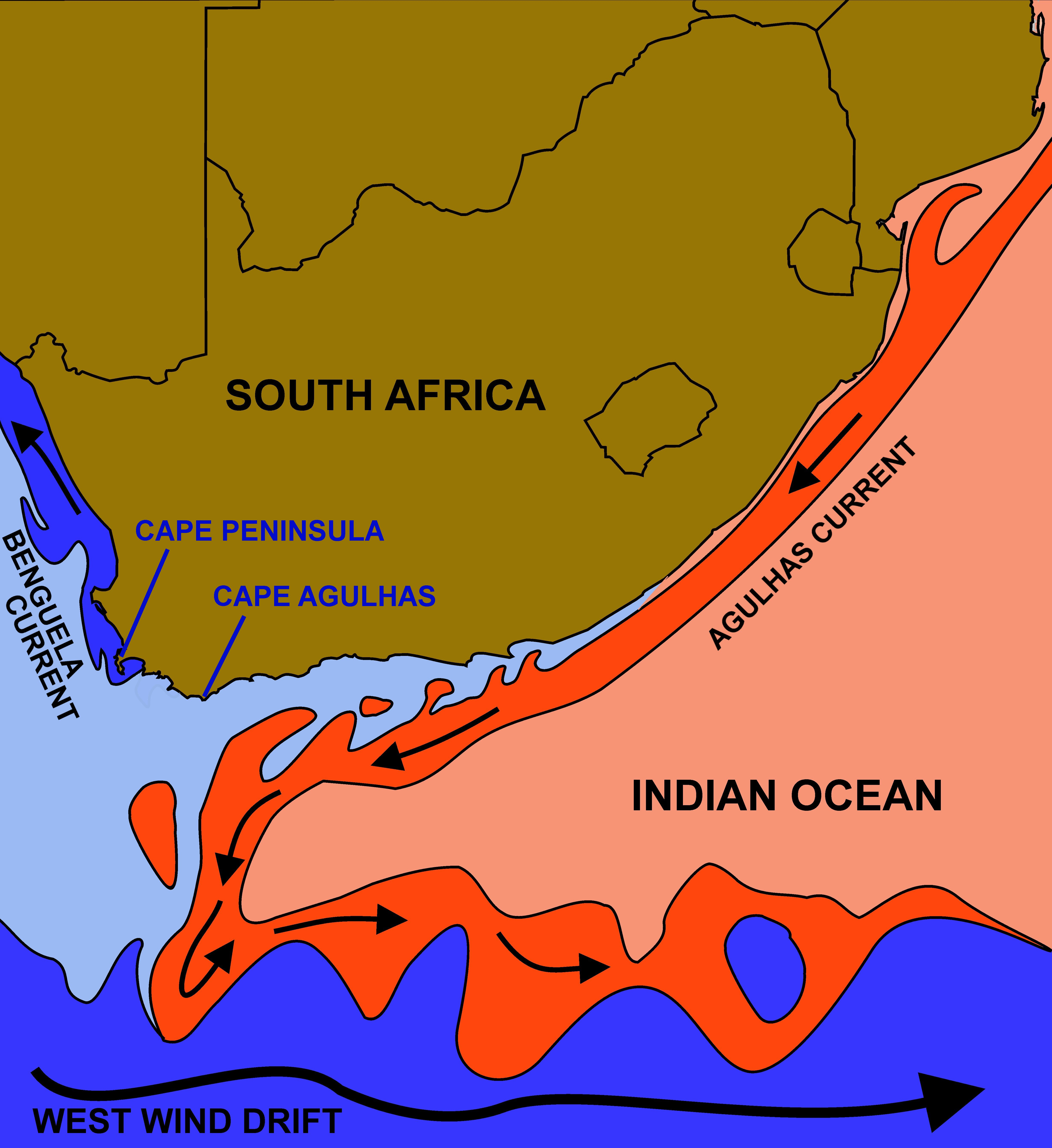
The courses of the warm Agulhas current (red) along the east coast of South Africa, and the cold Benguela current (blue) along the west coast. Note that the Benguela current does not originate from Antarctic waters in the South Atlantic Ocean, but from upwelling of water from the cold depths of the Atlantic Ocean against the west coast of the continent. The two currents do not "meet" anywhere along the south coast of Africa, except as random eddies from the two currents that arise and intermingle west of Cape Agulhas.

Cape Point is often mistakenly described as the place where the cold Benguela Current of the Atlantic Ocean meets the warm Agulhas Current of the Indian Ocean. In reality, the zone where the two currents meet and intermingle varies along the southern and southwestern Cape coast, generally occurring between Cape Agulhas and Cape Point.

The interaction between the two currents contributes to the microclimate of Cape Town and the surrounding region. Contrary to popular belief, their meeting does not produce a distinct visual boundary in the ocean, such as a visible line or abrupt change in water colour. The waters around Cape Point and the adjacent coastline are nevertheless subject to strong swells, tides, and localized currents, which have contributed to numerous maritime accidents and shipwrecks since the area became a major route for seafaring.

It is popular to fish along the coast, but the unpredictable swells make angling from the rocks very dangerous. Over the years, scores of fishermen have been swept to their deaths from the rocky platforms by frek waves. False Bay, which opens to the east and north of Cape Point, is the location of the well-known naval port of Simon's Town. The bay is also infamous for its great white sharks, which hunt the Cape fur seals that live there.

== Climate research ==
Cape Point is the site of one of the Global Atmosphere Watch's atmospheric research stations. In the early years of the 20th century, icebergs from Antarctica were occasionally sighted from Cape Point. There have been no authentic recent sightings of ice, which some climatologists and experts have attributed to global warming.

== Gallery ==
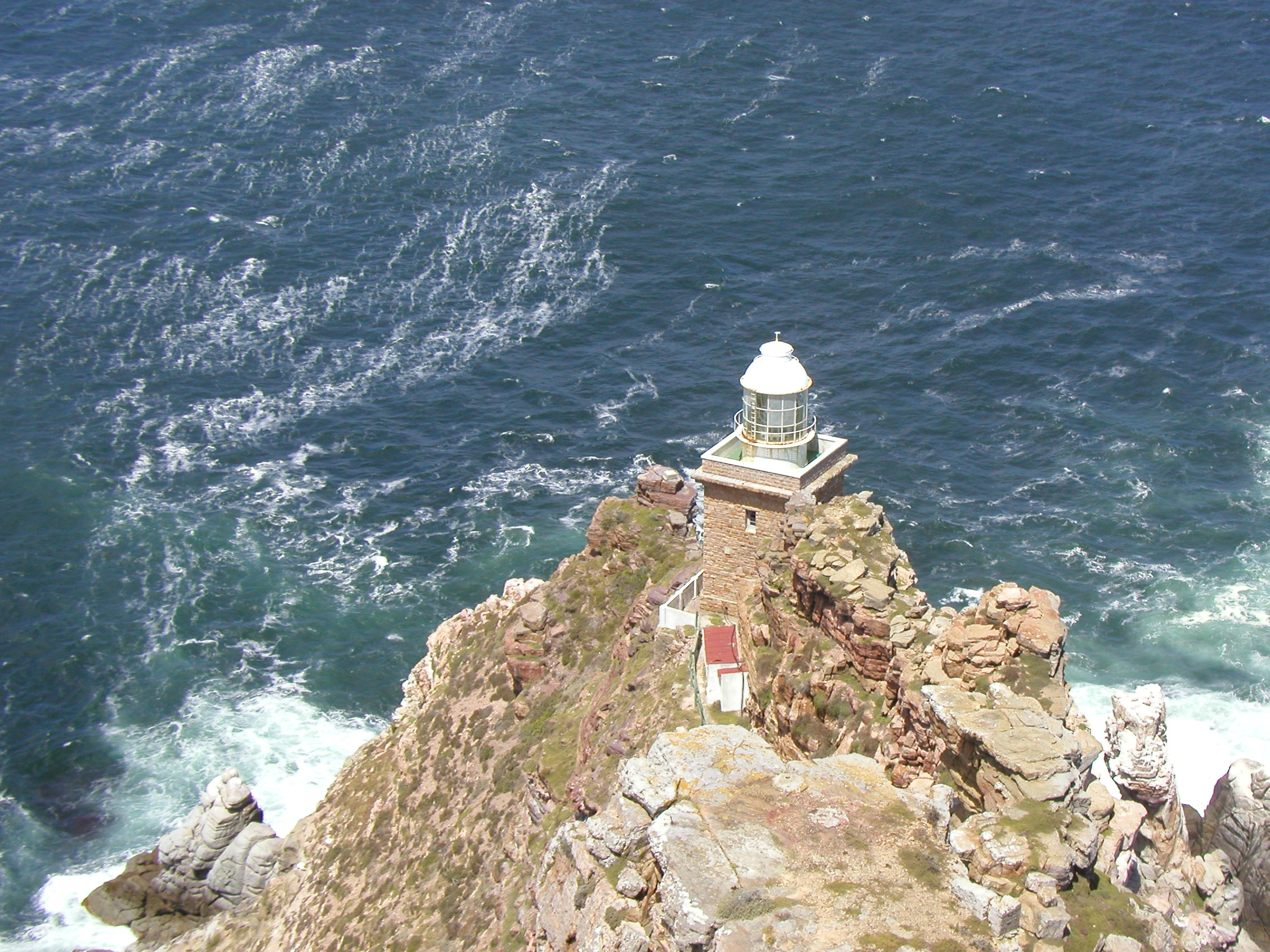
The "new" lighthouse of 1919, atop Dias Point, essentially Cape Point

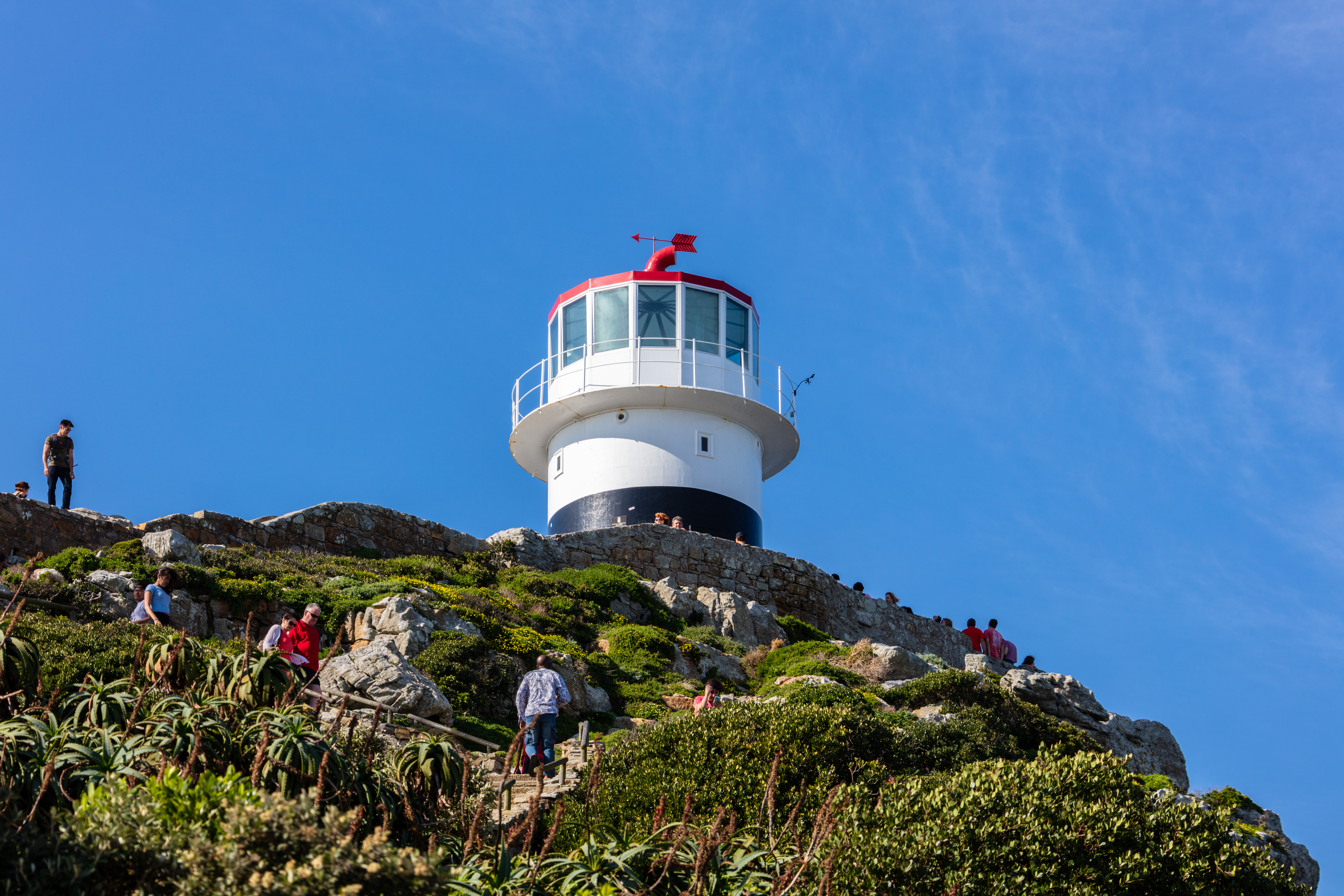
The old lighthouse at the top of the Cape Point promontory, in use from 1860 to 1919

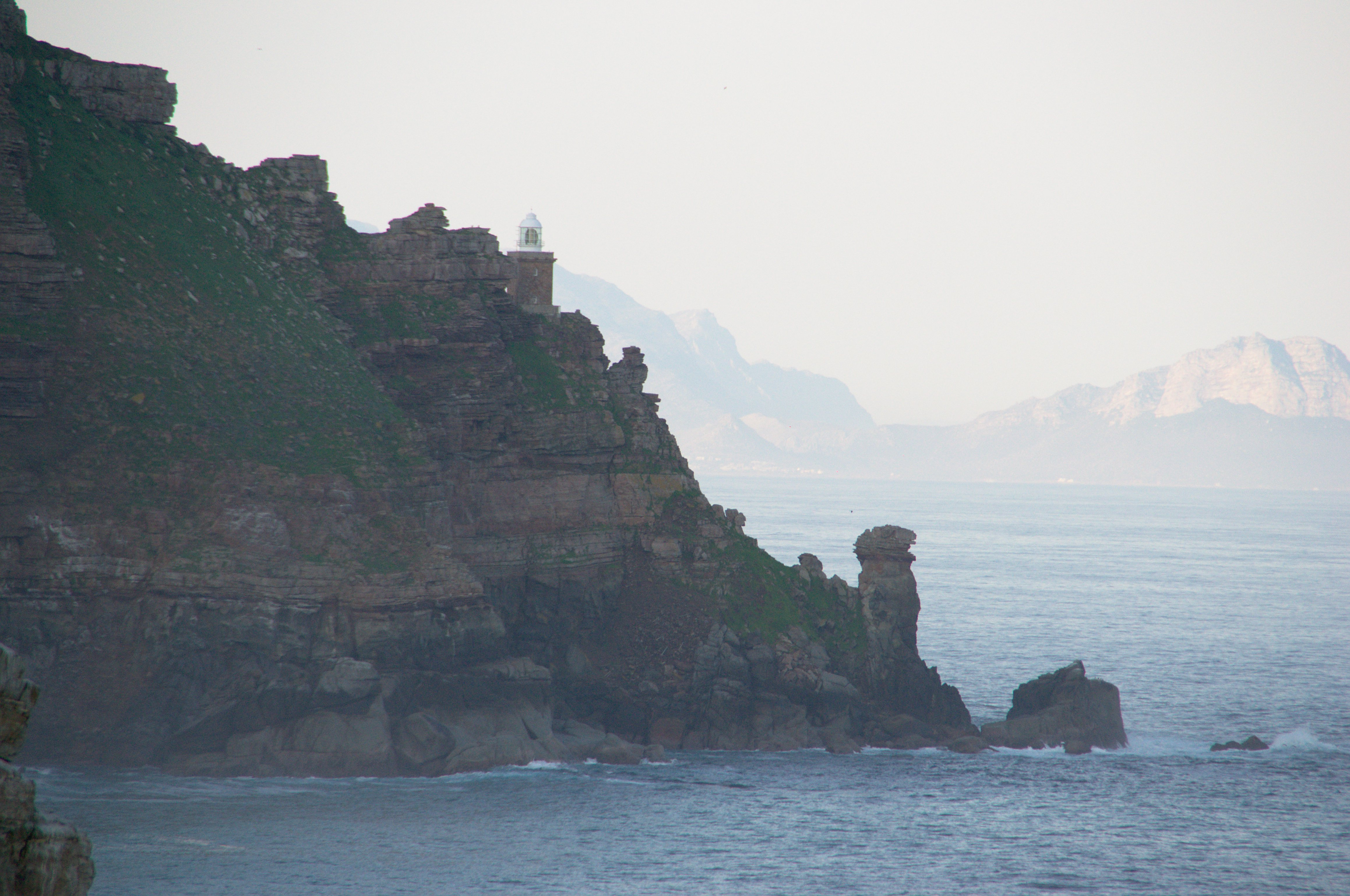
Cape Point and the new lighthouse as seen from the west. False Bay is beyond.

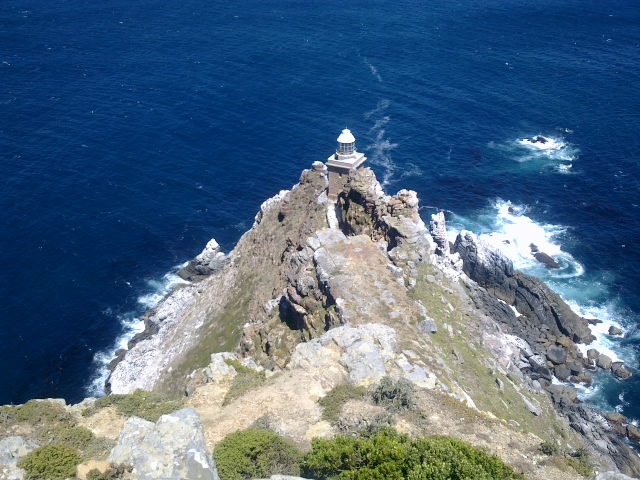
White surf breaks around Dias Rock, just offshore from the point

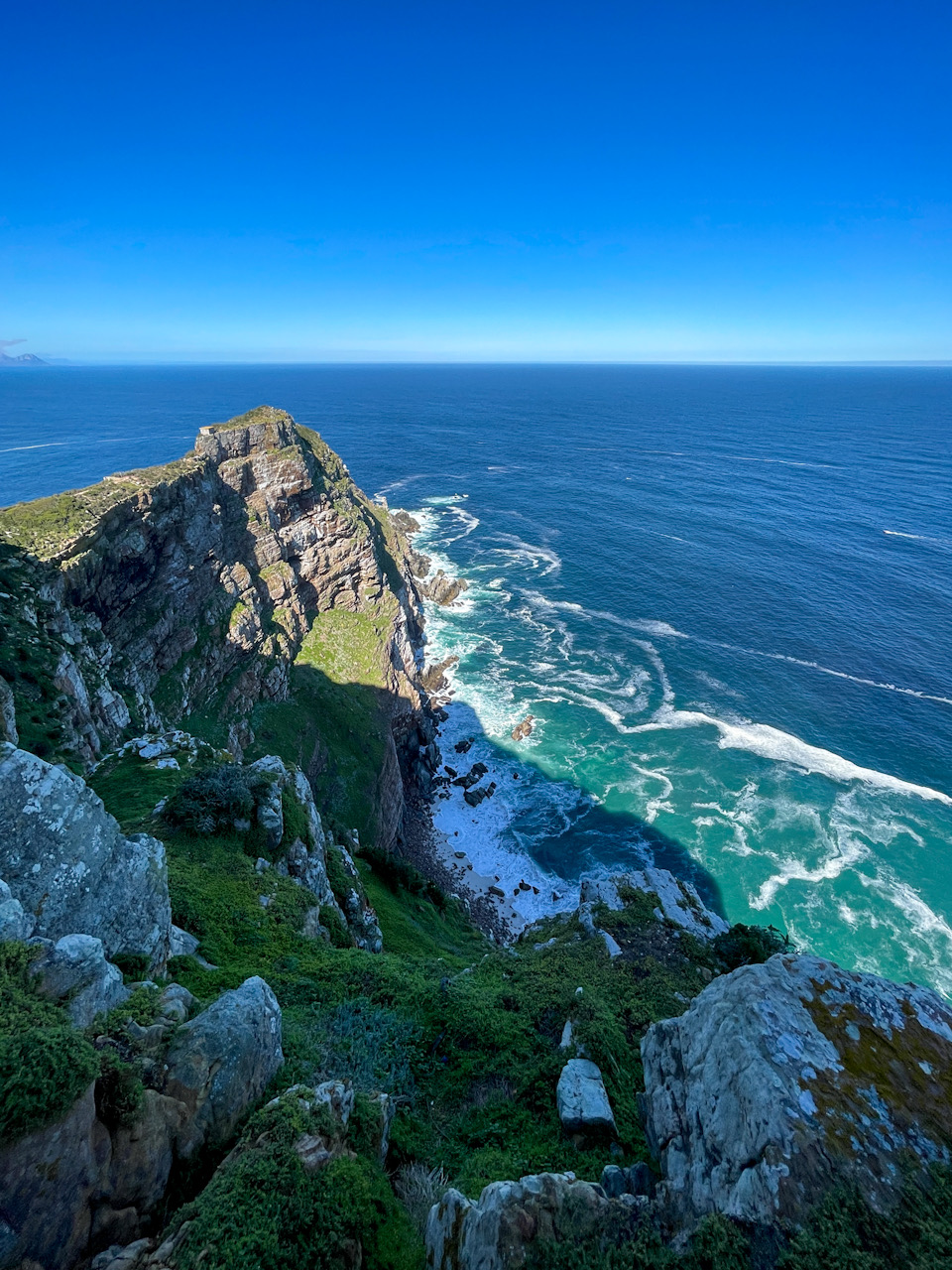
View from one of Cape Point's observation points (-34.3538, 18.4897) in Table Mountain National Park
