= Table Mountain National Park =

Nature conservation area on the Cape Peninsula in Cape Town, South Africa

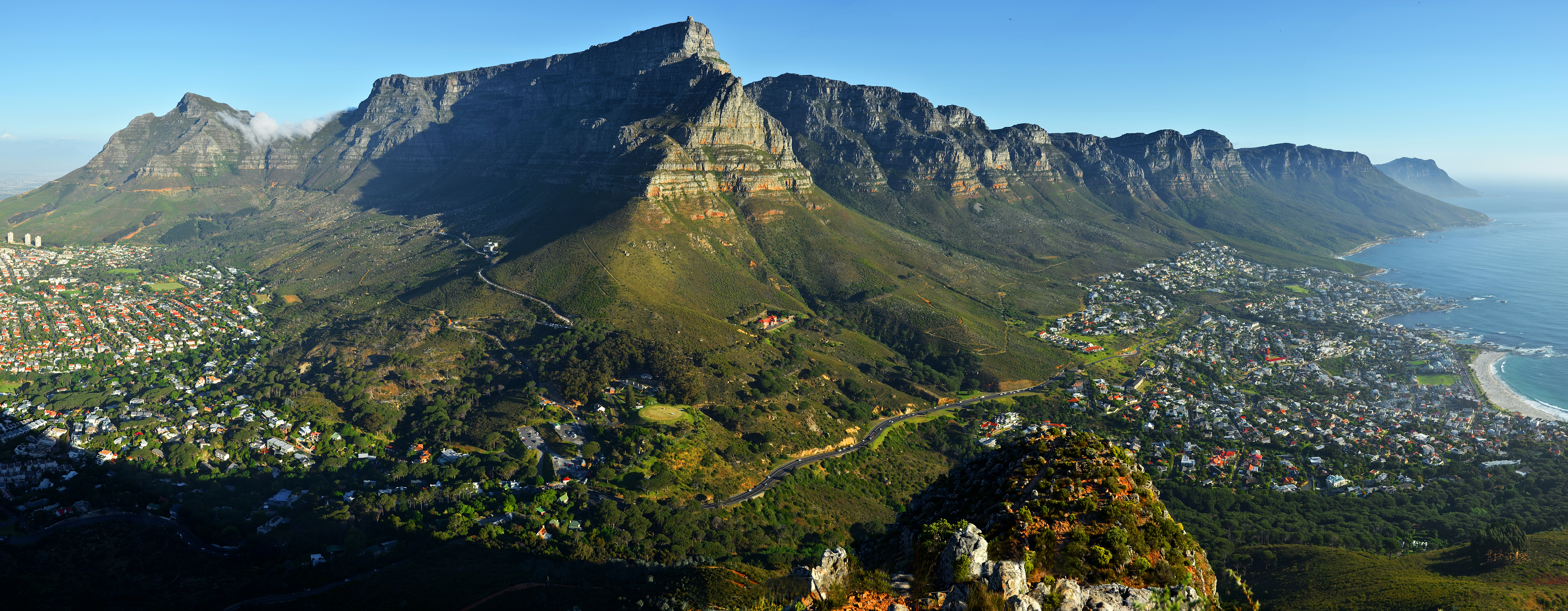
- Table Mountain seen from the slopes of Lion's Head
- Location of the park
- Location: Cape Town, Western Cape, South Africa
- Coordinates: 33°58′00″S 18°25′30″E
- Area: 221 km^{2} (85 sq mi)
- Established: 19 May 1998
- Governing body: South African National Parks
- Website: www.sanparks.org/parks/table-mountain
- Table Mountain National Park (South Africa)

Table Mountain National Park, previously known as the Cape Peninsula National Park, is a national park in Cape Town, South Africa, proclaimed on 29 May 1998, for the purpose of protecting the natural environment of the Table Mountain chain, and in particular the rare fynbos vegetation.

The park contains two well-known landmarks, Table Mountain, for which the park is named, and the Cape of Good Hope, the most southwestern extremity of Africa. The park is managed by South African National Parks (SANParks), and is included as part of the UNESCO Cape Floral Region World Heritage Site.

== History ==
Arguments for a national park on the Cape Peninsula, centred on Table Mountain, began in earnest in the mid-1930s. The Table Mountain Preservation Board was set up in 1952, and in 1957 its recommendation to the National Monuments Board was accepted, and Table Mountain was declared a national monument.

In the mid 1960s, the Cape Town City Council declared nature reserves on Table Mountain, Lion's Head, Signal Hill, and Silvermine. Following high fire incidence in the 1970s, Douglas Hey was appointed to assess the ecological state of Table Mountain and the southern Peninsula: he recommended in 1978 that all the Peninsula's mountains above 152m should be conserved.

This laid the foundations for the Cape Peninsula Protected Natural Environment (CPPNE) area, finally established in 1989. However, environmental management was still bedeviled by the fragmented nature of land ownership on the Peninsula.

Following a big fire above the city bowl in 1991, Attorney General Frank Kahn was appointed to reach consensus on a plan for rationalising management of the CPPNE.

In 1995, Prof. Brian Huntley recommended that SANParks be appointed to manage the CPPNE, with an agreement signed in April 1998 to transfer around 39,500 acres to SANParks.

On 29 May 1998, then-president Nelson Mandela proclaimed the Cape Peninsula National Park. The park's name was changed in May 2004 to the Table Mountain National Park, by Mohammed Valli Moosa, Minister of Environmental Affairs and Tourism.

== Geography ==
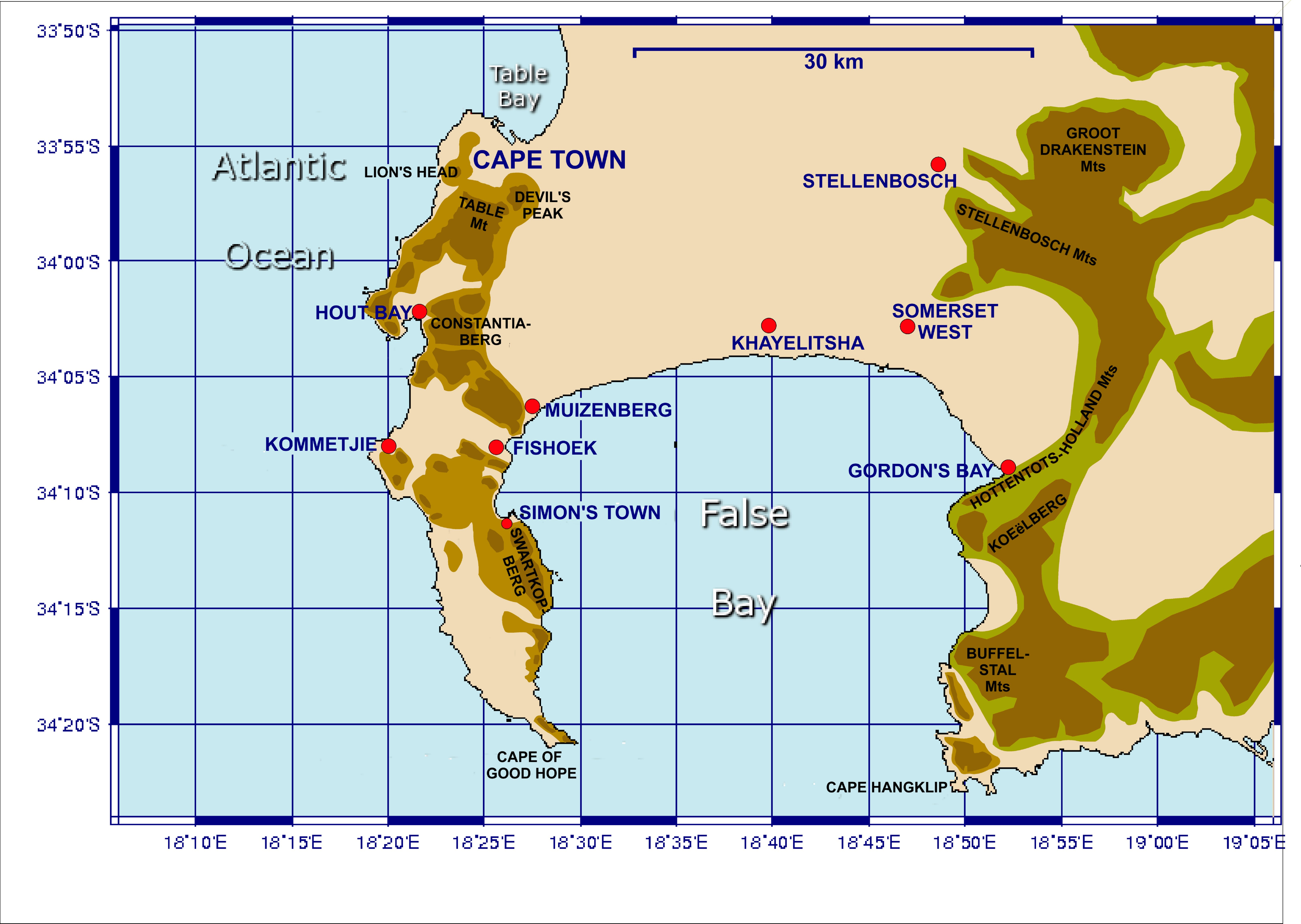
Map showing the Cape Peninsula, illustrating the positions of the Cape Town City Bowl, nestled between Table Mountain, Lion's Head, Devil's Peak and Table Bay, the main mountains and peaks that make up the Peninsula, and the Cape of Good Hope in the far south of the Peninsula. Most of the mountainous areas indicated in light and darker brown, as well as the southern end of the Peninsula, south of the 34° 10'S line of latitude, belong to the Table Mountain National Park.

The park runs approximately north–south along the range of mountains that make up the mountainous spine of the Cape Peninsula, from Signal Hill in the north, through Lion's Head, Table Mountain, Constantiaberg, Silvermine, the mountains of the southern Peninsula, terminating at Cape Point.

The park is not a single contiguous area; the undeveloped mountainous areas which make up most of the park are separated by developed urban areas on the shallower terrain. Thus, the park is divided into three separate sections, as listed below.

=== Table Mountain section ===
This section covers Signal Hill, Lion's Head, Table Mountain proper, including the Back Table (the rear, lower part of the mountain), Devil's Peak, the Twelve Apostles (actually a series of seventeen peaks along the Atlantic seaboard), and Orange Kloof (a specially protected area not open to the public).

It borders on central Cape Town in the north, Camps Bay and the Atlantic coast in the west, the Southern Suburbs in the east, and Hout Bay in the south.

This section was formed from the Table Mountain National Monument, Cecilia Park, and Newlands Forest. Kirstenbosch National Botanical Garden is not officially part of the national park, but its higher reaches are maintained as part of the park.

=== Silvermine-Tokai section ===
This section runs northwest to southeast across the Peninsula from the Atlantic seaboard to the False Bay coast. It covers Constantiaberg, Steenberg Peak and the Kalk Bay mountains. It borders on Hout Bay in the northwest, the suburbs of Constantia and Tokai in the north-east, Kalk Bay in the southeast, and Fish Hoek and Noordhoek in the south-west.

This section was formed from the Tokai State Forest and the Silvermine Nature Reserve.

=== Cape Point section ===
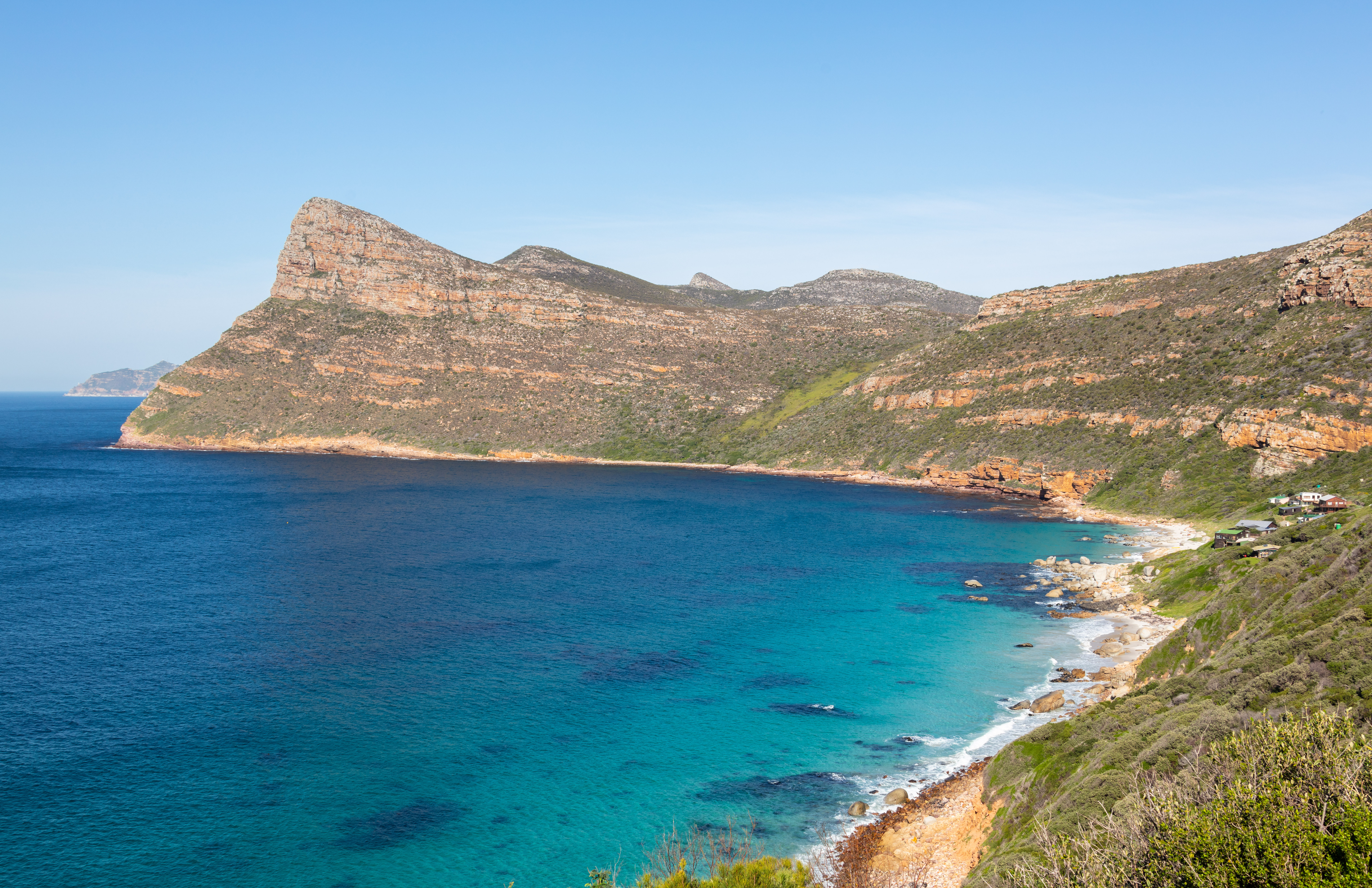
Smitswinkel Bay, between Simon's Town and Cape Point.

This section covers the most southern area of the Cape Peninsula, stretching from Cape Point and the Cape of Good Hope in the south, as far north as Scarborough on the Atlantic coast and Simon's Town on the False Bay coast. It was formed from the Cape of Good Hope Nature Reserve.

== Flora ==
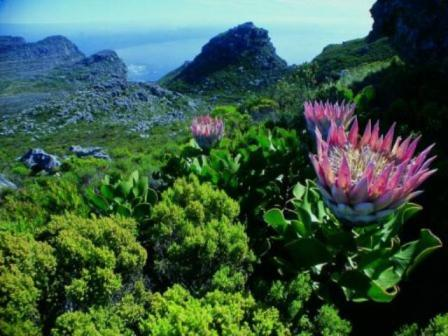
A King Protea growing in Peninsula Sandstone Fynbos in Table Mountain National Park

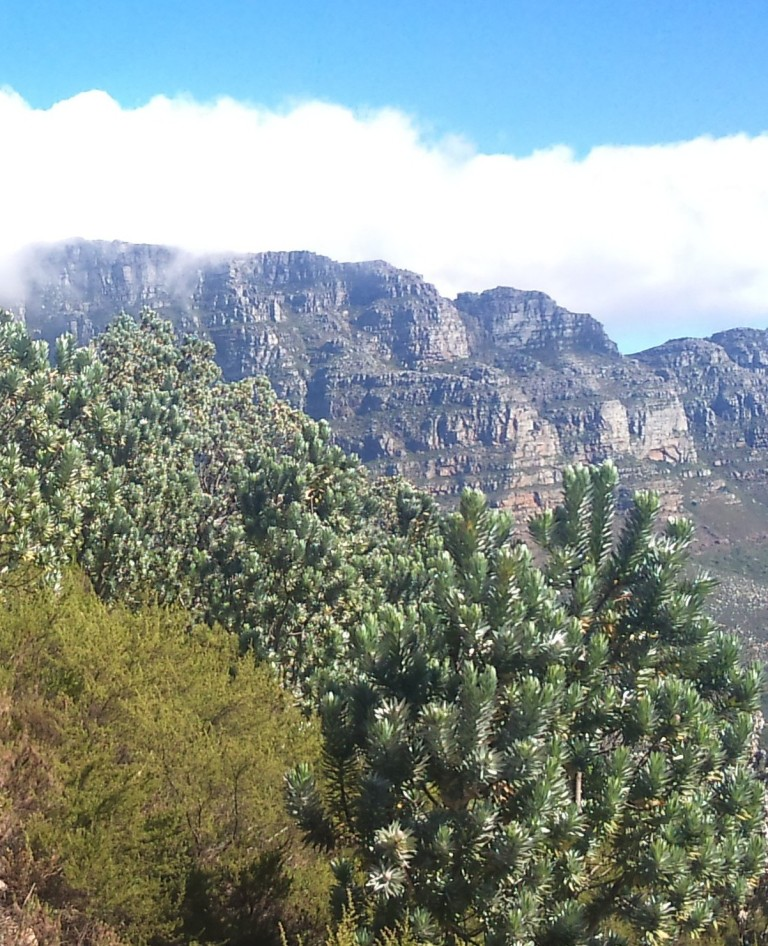
Silver trees (Leucadendron argenteum) growing in Peninsula Granite Fynbos in Table Mountain National Park

This area forms part of the Cape Floristic Region and, as such, supports a high diversity of flora, much of which is rare and endemic. Protea, erica, restio and Asteraceae species, as well as geophytes, are all found in abundance. The main indigenous vegetation types are Peninsula Sandstone Fynbos and Cape Granite Fynbos, both of which are endangered and endemic to Cape Town, occurring nowhere else in the world.

In addition, some sections of the park are the natural home of deep, indigenous Afro-temperate forests.

A well known local tree is the Silver tree (Leucadendron argenteum), a popularly cultivated species which is found in the wild only on the slopes of Lion's Head and a few scattered locations elsewhere on the Cape Peninsula (a notable area is above Kirstenbosch).

The park lies in the heart of the Cape Floral Kingdom, which is a biodiversity hotspot and is seen by botanists as a botanical anomaly. In fact, there are more species of plants in Table Mountain National Park (over two thousand) than exist in the whole of the United Kingdom. Much of the unique flora in the area surrounding the park has been lost to agriculture and urban development.

Indigenous plants are being increasingly harvested for traditional medicines, an activity some regard as a form of poaching. Such produce can be found on sale as remedies on the streets of Cape Town's central business district. Indigenous species are also threatened by invasive plants such as Acacia cyclops, three Hakea species, and invasive pines that were planted in commercial timber plantations on the slopes of the mountain also. Today the Table Mountain range has the highest concentration of threatened species of any continental area of equivalent size in the world.

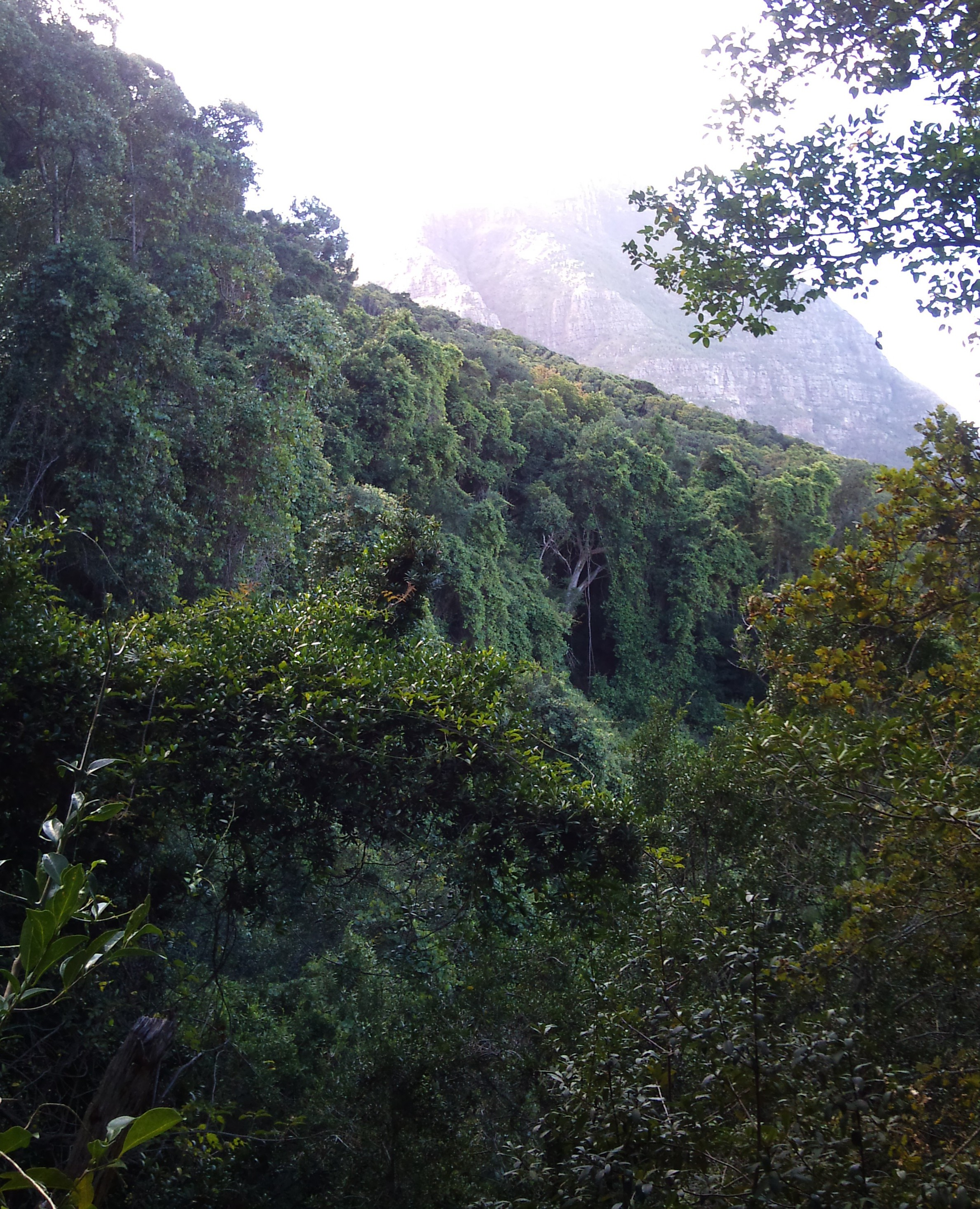
Indigenous afro-montane forest on Table Mountain, with Devil's Peak visible in the distance

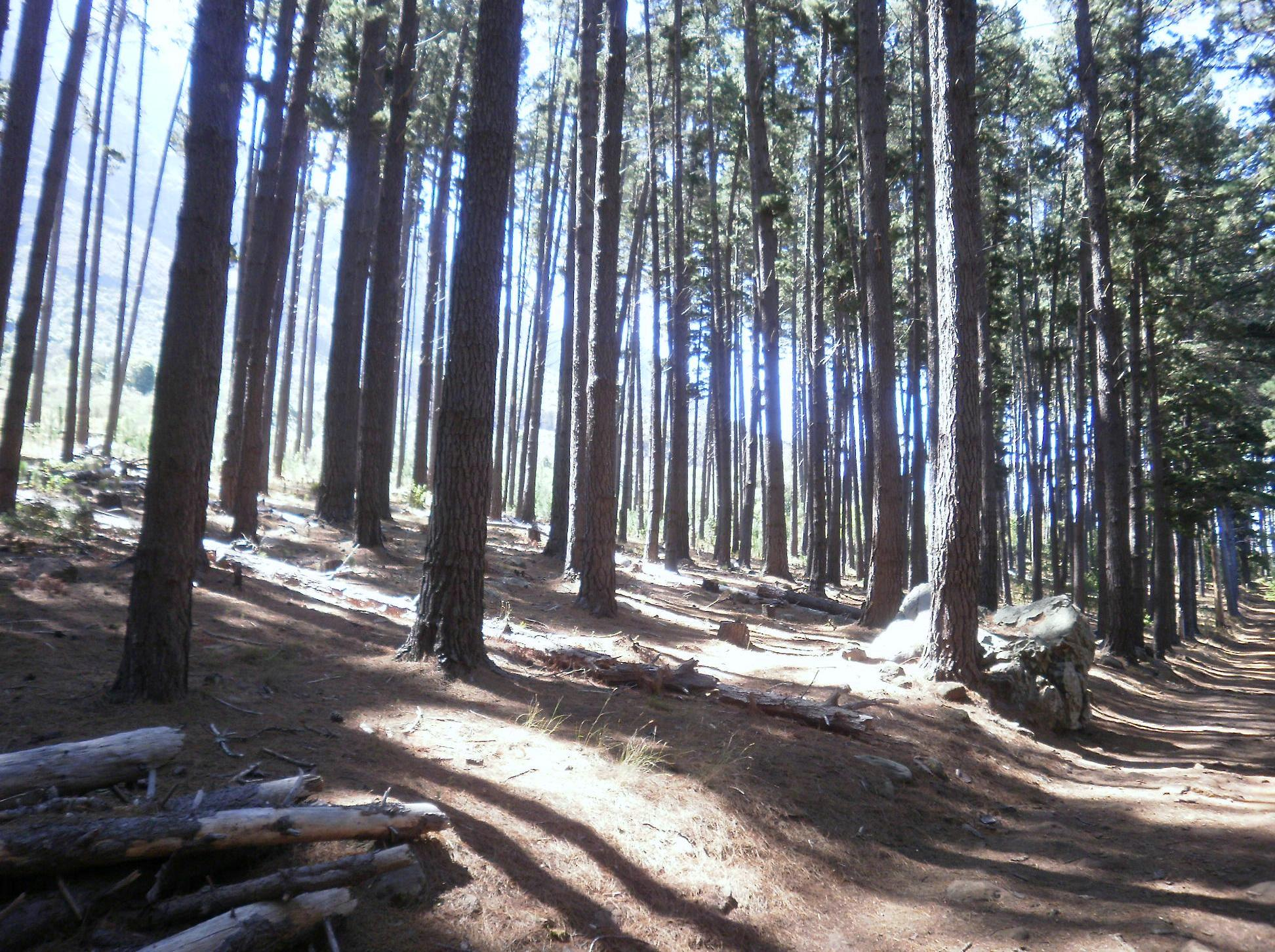
Commercial plantation of invasive European Pinus pinaster or "Cluster Pine", on Table Mountain's eastern slopes

=== Removal of non-indigenous forests ===
SANParks have been criticised for their programme of removing invasive non-indigenous trees. These alien forests make up only 2% of the park, but cover areas that were previously incredibly rich in biodiversity.

Some of the mature alien invasive trees that pose a threat to the fynbos region are Port Jackson, Rooikrans, Hakea, Pine and blue gum.

The invasive trees were originally planted as commercial plantations for timber, once most of the indigenous afro-montane forests had been felled. Unfortunately, the fertile lower slopes that were selected for the plantations are also the areas of the park which host the highest proportion of endemic and threatened species.

The park's current programme is to allow for the regrowth of the indigenous forests, while slowly removing the plantations of invasive trees. This removal has been controversial, however, as some of the pine plantations are recreational areas for people living in the wealthy suburbs adjacent to the park.

== Fauna ==
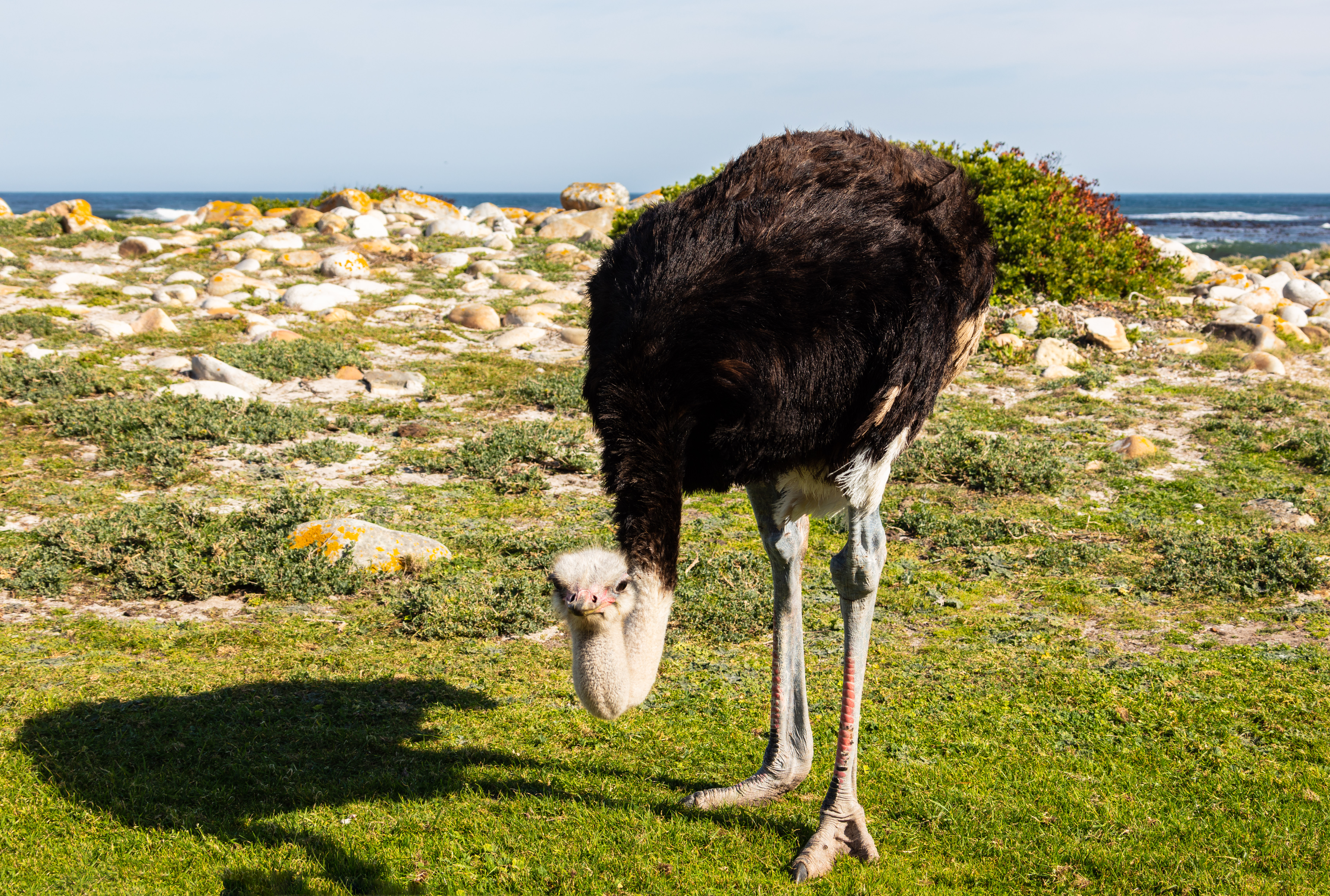
Male ostrich at Cape Good Hope

Larger predators that historically roamed the area include the Cape lion, leopard (which persisted as late as the 1920s, and tracks are claimed to be still found today), as well as spotted hyena and black-backed jackal. Large herbivores similarly disappeared at the hands of the European settlers, for example elephant, black rhinoceros, kudu, eland, mountain zebra and bontebok. However, the last three species were reintroduced to the Cape Point section of the park.

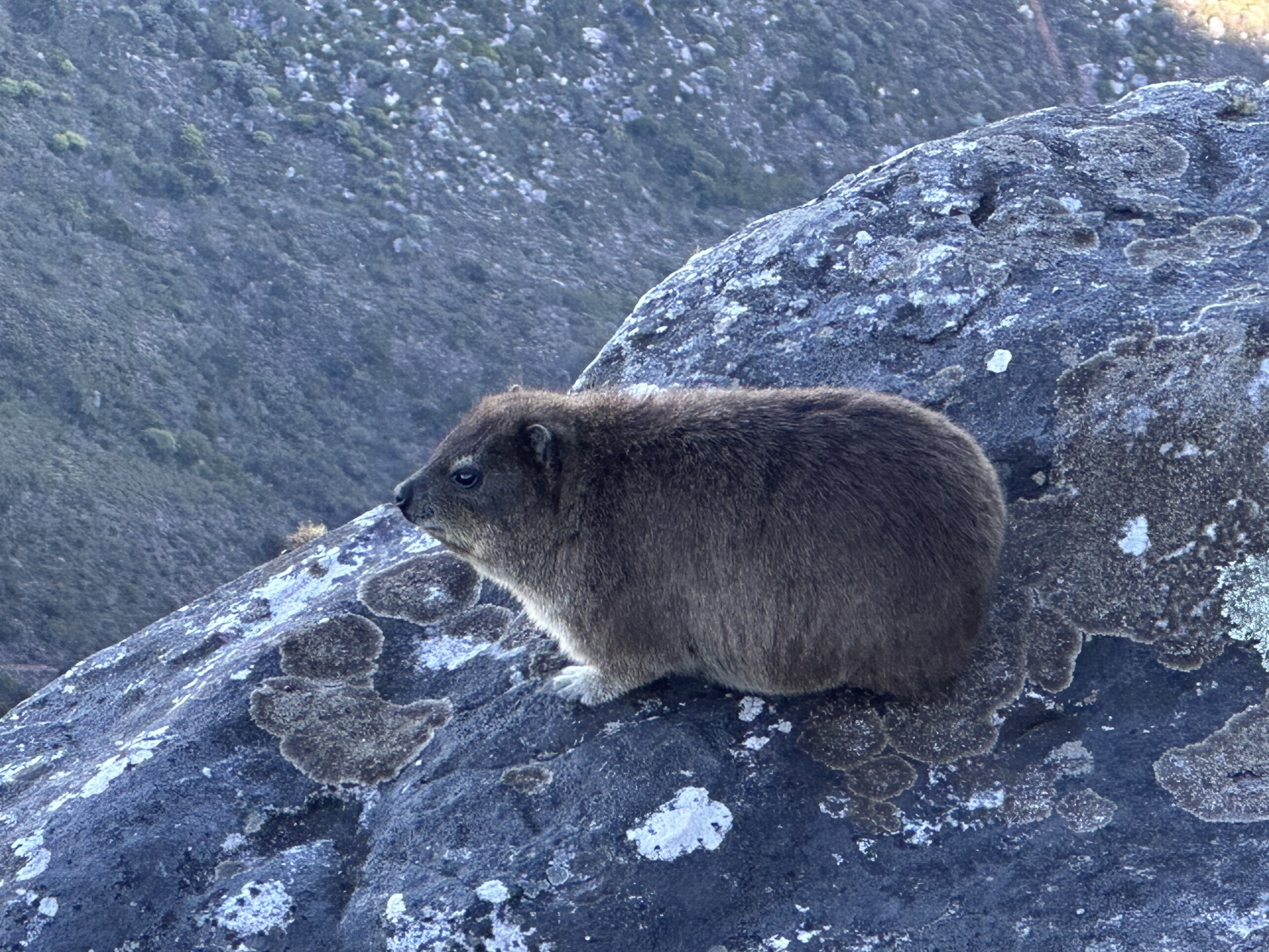
Dassies (rock hyrax) Procavia Capensis, Table Mountain National Park, Cape Town, South Africa

Smaller mammals are still found in the park: caracal, rock hyrax and a variety of small antelope species, such as the Cape grysbok and notably the recently reintroduced klipspringer.

The population of the alien Himalayan tahr originated from a pair that escaped from the now-defunct Zoological Gardens on Groot Schuur Estate below Devil's Peak in 1935. As of 2006, virtually all tahrs have been culled from Table Mountain, thus clearing the way for the re-introduction of the smaller klipspringer, with which the tahr would have competed with due to similar niches. However it is still highly likely that a few survived.

Chacma baboons inhabit the southern parts of the park. They are highly visible and popular with tourists, but are capable of becoming extremely dangerous when they become accustomed to human beings and start to associate them with free food. Many residents who live in places close to the park, such as Da Gama Park, Tokai and Scarborough, often clash with baboons which have attempted, and succeeded, in raiding their houses for food.

Some residents resort to measures such as reinforcing their security by erecting electric fences, as well as illegal measures like shooting them with pellet guns, running them over, and setting dogs on them. This is ineffective as it can maim the baboons and simply reinforce their penchant for gaining easy food, as it is easier for baboons to raid a dustbin for scraps than forage in the mountains with only one hand. Thus visitors to the park mustn't be allowed to feed the baboons at all.

A rare endemic species of amphibian is only found on Table Mountain: the Table Mountain ghost frog. The Park lies in the heart of the Cape Floral Kingdom, which is a biodiversity hotspot and is seen by botanists as a botanical anomaly. In fact, there are more species of plants in Table Mountain National Park (over two thousand) than exist in the whole of the United Kingdom.

== Marine Protected Area ==
The Table Mountain National Park Marine Protected Area, off the coast of the park

The Table Mountain National Park Marine Protected Area is an inshore marine protected area around the Cape Peninsula. It was proclaimed in Government Gazette No. 26431 of 4 June 2004 in terms of the Marine Living Resources Act, 18 of 1998.

The MPA is of value for conservation of a wide range of endemic species, and has considerable economic value as a tourist destination. It encloses a large number of recreational dive sites visited by residents and tourists from further afield.

The shark and whale watching tourist industries are also represented, and there are several popular surf breaks. The MPA is mainly a controlled zone where extractive activities are allowed under permit, with six small no-take zones. The Table Mountain National Park administers the MPA.

The marine ecology is unusually varied for an area of this size, as a result of the meeting of two major oceanic water masses near Cape Point, and the park extends into two coastal marine bioregions.

The ecology of the west, or "Atlantic Seaboard" side of the park, is noticeably different in character and biodiversity from that of the east, or "False Bay" side. Both sides are classified as temperate waters, but there is a significant difference in average temperature, with the Atlantic side being noticeably colder on average.

The MPA contains culturally significant fish traps, historical wrecks and traditional fishing communities, and is also important for commercial fisheries. Part of the West Coast rock lobster industry takes place within the MPA – as well as recreational and subsistence fishers, and an illegal poaching industry mostly targeting abalone, rock lobster and territorial linefish from the no-take zones.

== Tourist attractions ==
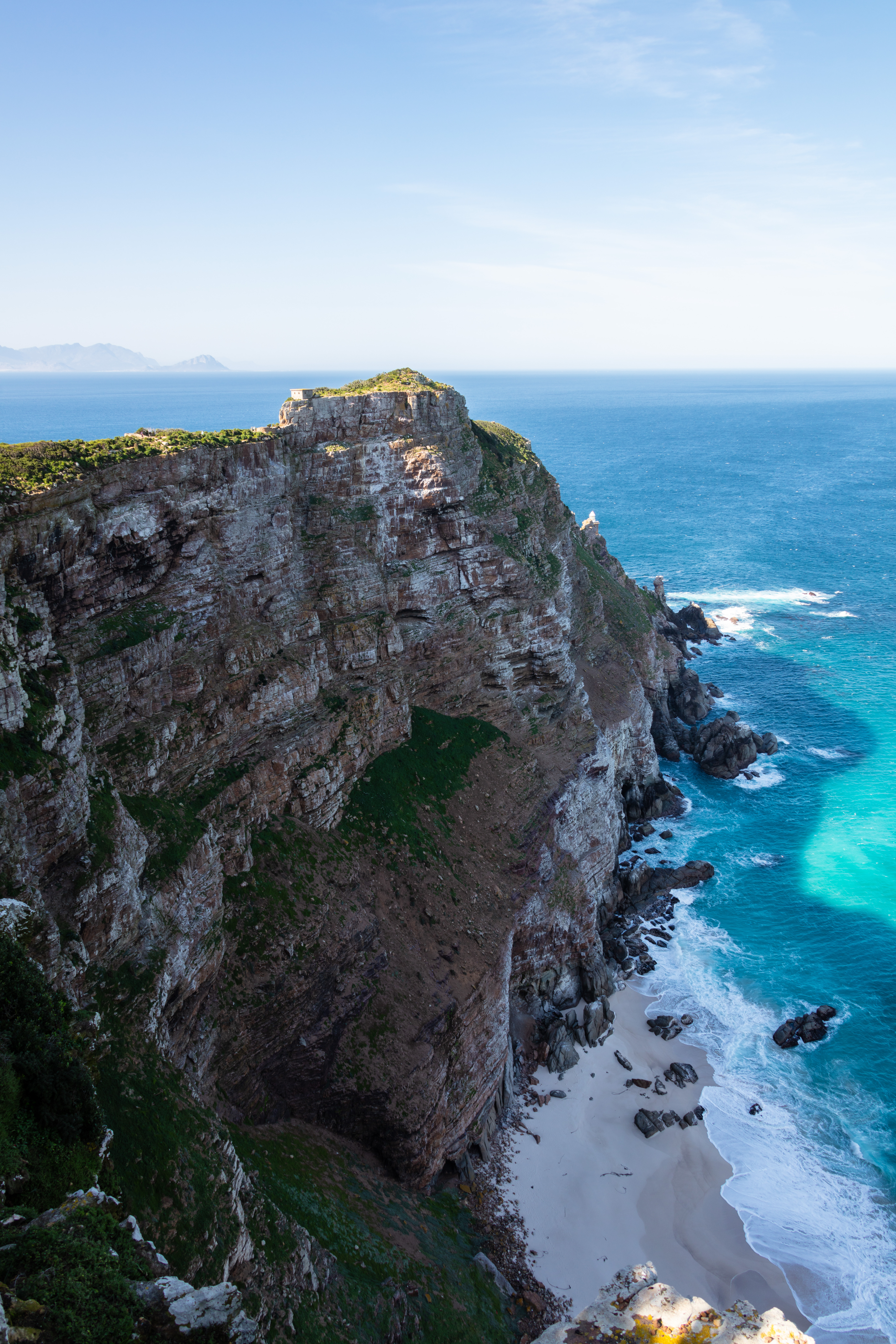
View over Cape Point; the lighthouse's white dome is just visible.

- The Table Mountain Cableway carries visitors from the Lower Cable Station on Kloofnek Road to the top of Table Mountain, allowing visitors to avoid the fairly arduous walk up.
- Boulders Beach, south of Simon's Town, contains a large colony of African penguins.
- Cape Point and the Cape of Good Hope are very scenic, although they are neither the southernmost tip of Africa nor the meeting place of the Atlantic and Indian Oceans, as is often believed.

== See also ==
- Cape Town – Legislative capital of South Africa
- List of protected areas of South Africa
- Table Mountain – Mountain overlooking Cape Town, South Africa
- Cape Peninsula – Rocky peninsula in the Western Cape, South Africa
- Cape Point – Headland in the Western Cape, South Africa
- Cape of Good Hope – Headland of Cape Peninsula, South Africa
- Cape Floristic Region – Smallest of the six recognised floral kingdoms of the world
- Table Mountain National Park Marine Protected Area – Marine conservation area around the Cape Peninsula in South Africa
- 2021 Table Mountain fire - Major Fire in the National Park
