= Aquadulcaris pheronyx =

Conservation status
- Critically Endangered (IUCN 2.3)

Scientific classification
- Kingdom: Animalia
- Phylum: Arthropoda
- Class: Malacostraca
- Order: Amphipoda
- Family: Paramelitidae
- Genus: Aquadulcaris
- Species: A. pheronyx

Binomial name
- Aquadulcaris pheronyx (Stewart & Griffiths, 1992)

Species of crustacean

Aquadulcaris pheronyx is a species of crustacean in family Paramelitidae. It is endemic to the Constantiaberg, a mountain near Cape Town, South Africa, and is listed as Critically Endangered on the IUCN Red List.
