= Constantia, Cape Town =

Constantia
- Suburb
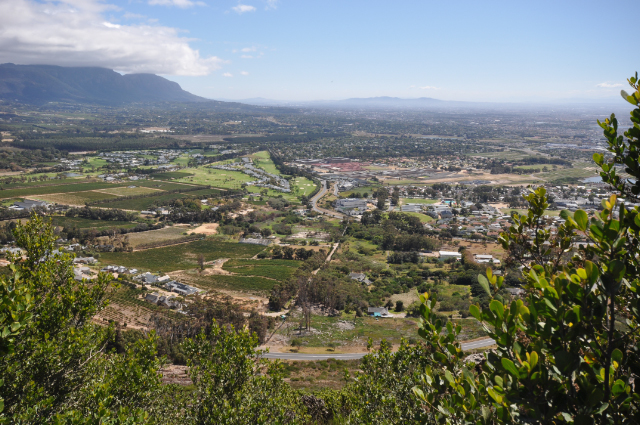
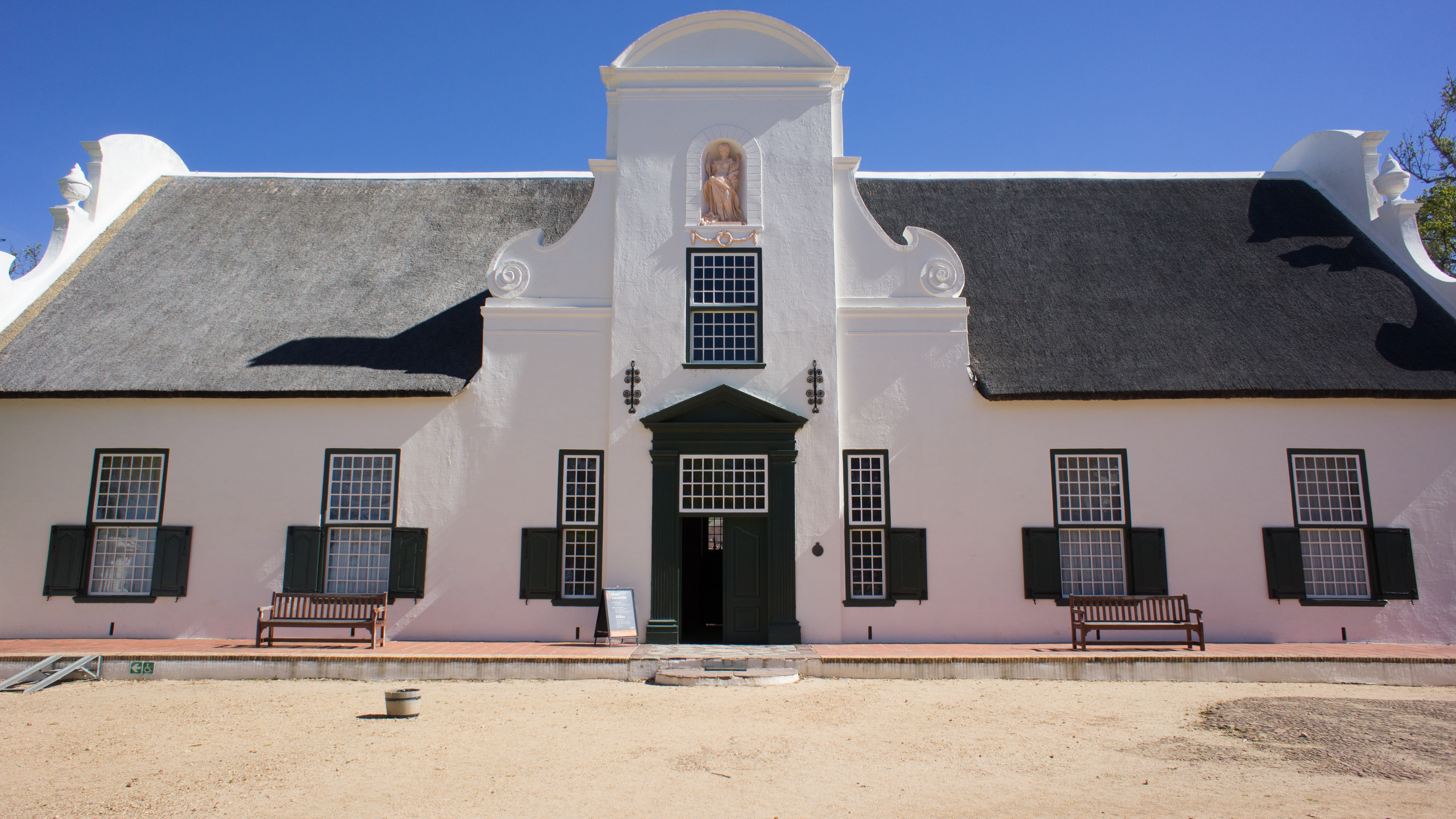
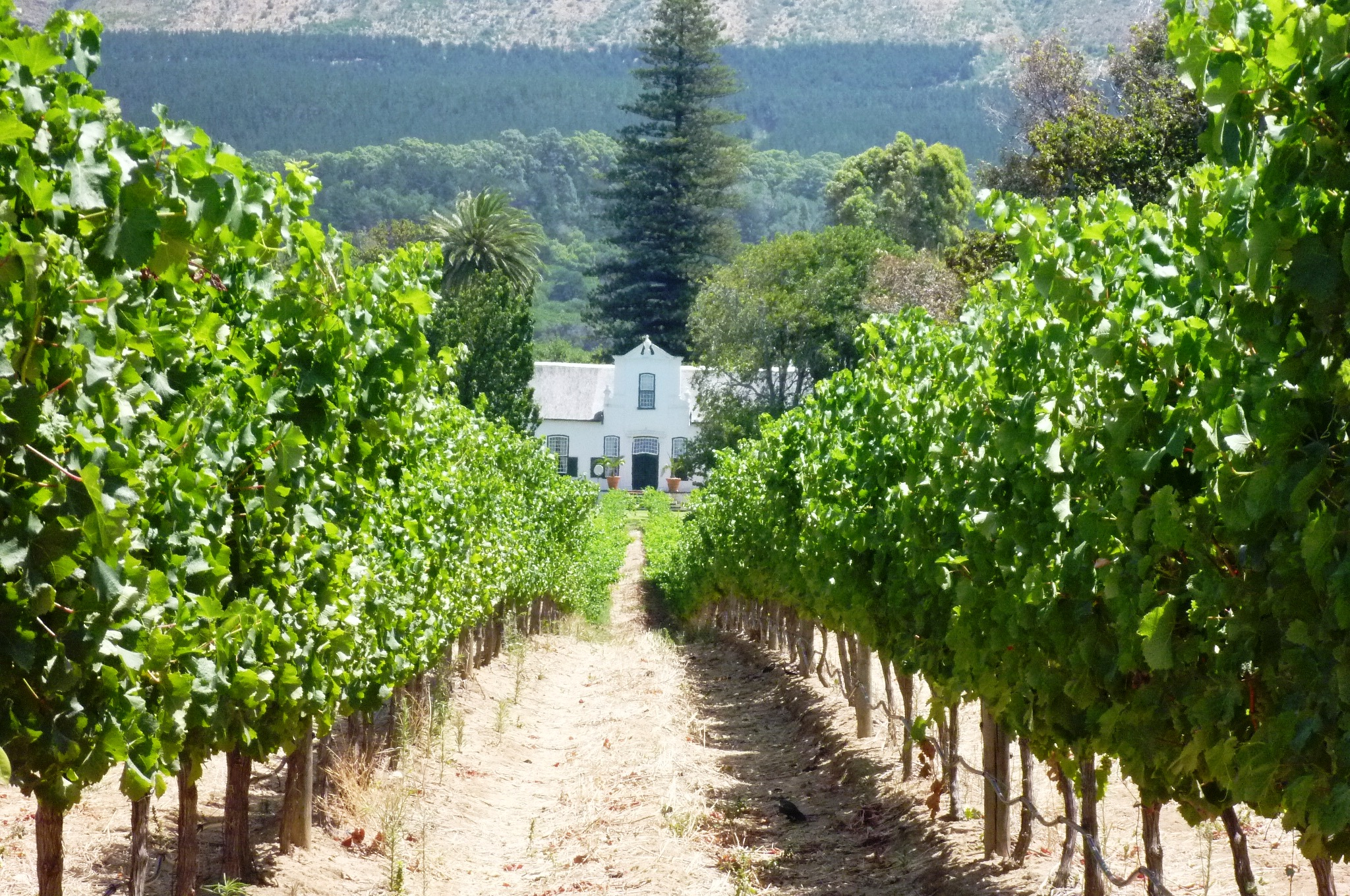
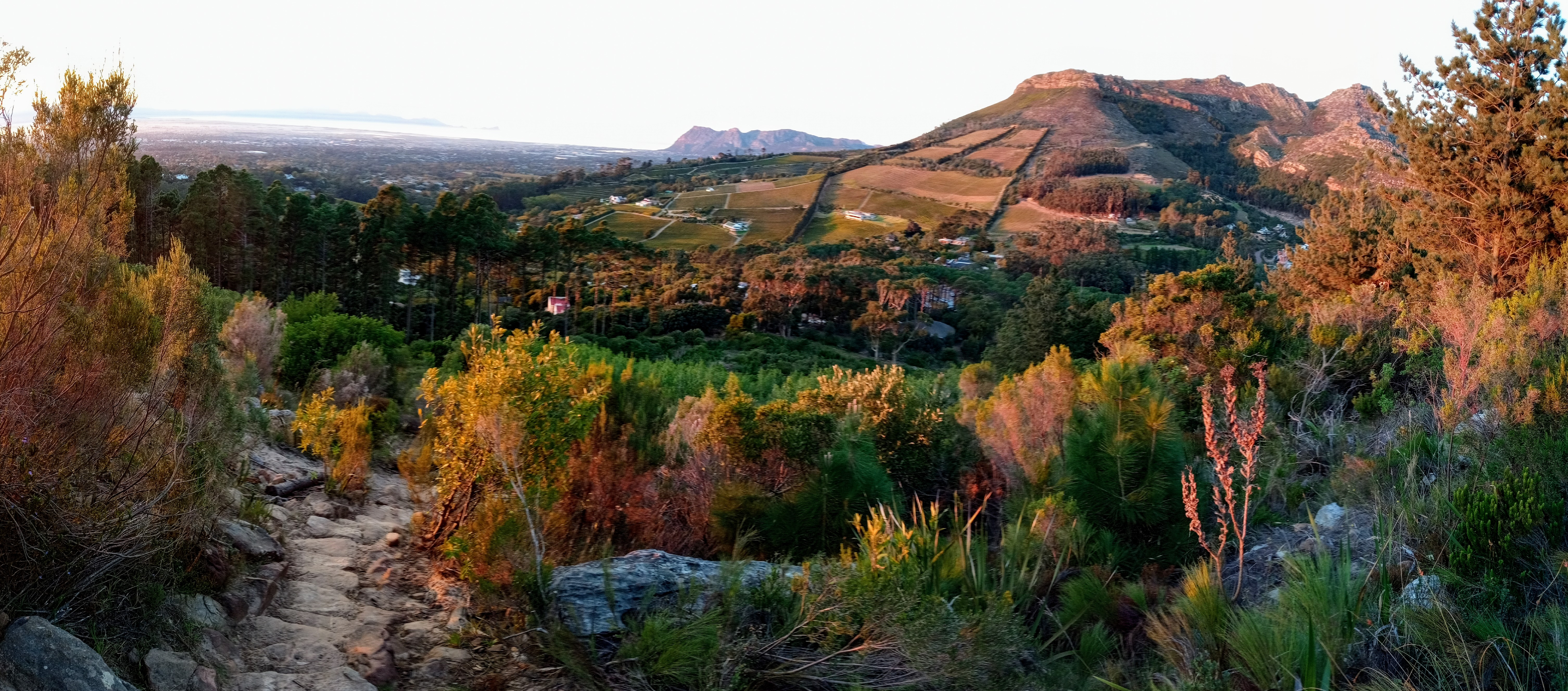
- View of Constantia Groot Constantia Buitenverwachting Estate Constantia Nek
- Interactive map of Constantia
- Coordinates: 34°01′53″S 18°25′06″E
- Country: South Africa
- Province: Western Cape
- Municipality: City of Cape Town
- Main Place: Cape Town

Government
  - Councillor: Liz Brunette (Ward 62) (DA); Denis Joseph (Ward 71) (DA); Carol Bew (Ward 73) (DA)

Area
  - Total: 23.9 km^{2} (9.2 sq mi)
- Elevation: 91 m (299 ft)

Population (2011)
  - Total: 12,564
  - Density: 526/km^{2} (1,360/sq mi)

Racial makeup (2011)
  - Black African: 9.4%
  - Coloured: 8.1%
  - Indian/Asian: 2.0%
  - White: 78.5%
  - Other: 1.9%

First languages (2011)
  - English: 83.3%
  - Afrikaans: 9.4%
  - IsiXhosa: 2.0%
  - Other: 5.2%
- Time zone: UTC+2 (SAST)
- Postal code (street): 7806
- PO box: 7848
- Area code: 021

Constantia is an affluent residential suburb in the Southern Suburbs of Cape Town, South Africa, situated about 20 kilometres south of the Cape Town CBD. It is considered to be one of the most prestigious suburbs in South Africa, with large, expensive properties attracting affluent residents.

Constantia is also one of the largest neighborhoods in Cape Town by area. The Constantia Valley lies to the east of and at the foot of the Constantiaberg mountain. Constantia Nek is a low pass linking to Hout Bay in the west.

== History ==
Constantia is one of the oldest districts of Cape Town and is famed for its wine. The estate of Groot Constantia (Dutch for Great Constantia) was established in 1685 by the Dutch Colonial Governor of Cape Town, Simon van der Stel.

Other notable wine farms in the area include the oldest estate, Steenberg (Dutch for Mountain of Stone), established in 1682, Buitenverwachting (Beyond Expectations), Klein Constantia (Small Constantia) and Constantia Uitsig (View of Constantia). Before the twentieth century, the region was noted for its exports of Vin de Constance; a sweet dessert wine. Many years ago the trade was crippled by the arrival in the Cape of a parasite that attacked the vines.

In 1661, during the Dutch conquest of Sumatra, Sheik Abdurachman Matebe Shah and his companion Sheikh Mahmoud were exiled to Constantia by the Dutch. Sheik Abdurachman is regarded as one of the three people that first brought Islam to South Africa. The kramat at Klein Constantia is built on the site that Sheik Abdurachman is thought to have died in 1681 or 1682.

About 220 slaves worked over a period of 150 years on the land planted with vineyards, fruit, and olive trees at the time of Van der Stel. A labour shortage after emancipation indicates that slaves moved away from the farms where they worked, but possibly stayed in the area.

From the mid-1800s to the 1960s, Constantia remained a rural area of wine estates in which Hottentot, Cape Malay, San and coloured residents constituted the majority. They were farmers, farm workers, domestics and fruit and flower sellers and lived in the areas of Strawberry Lane, Sillery Road, Spaanschemat River Road and Ladies Mile Road.

In 1961 Constantia was zoned as a "White Group Area" under the then-apartheid government's Group Areas Act. In the late 1960s, Constantia inhabitants classified as coloured or black were forcibly removed to areas in the Cape Flats like Mitchell's Plain, Manenberg, and Lotus River.

On Heritage Day 2009, a plaque remembering the Strawberry Lane community was unveiled by Cape Town's mayor Dan Plato.

In 2010, after around 50 years of petitioning, the Solomon family won one of the most successful land claim cases in South Africa's history, and received their Constantia property back with a title deed in 2012. The land was taken from them under the Group Areas Act, and at the time, had 30 houses on it, and the family used it as a thriving agricultural plot.

It comprised Lots 10 and 11 of a farm once known as Sillery, which sit in a prime location along Ladies Mile Road, close to the M3, and at the time they won the case with the Land Claims Commission, was estimated to be worth tens of millions of rands.

In 2018, the Constantia Ratepayers' and Residents' Association (CRRA), a homeowners' association, took the Solomon Family Trust to court, stating that the shopping center did not match the look and feel of Constantia as it was unattractive, and too large. The family decided to go ahead with their plans anyway, and the City of Cape Town Municipal Planning Tribunal (MPT) approved the planning application.

The CRRA then appealed, but this was rejected by then-Mayor Patricia de Lille, and to the satisfaction of the Solomons, construction went ahead as planned, turning the site into a building that has won multiple architectural awards - what is now the upmarket shopping center, Constantia Emporium.

Mark Thatcher, the son of Margaret Thatcher, and Charles Spencer, 9th Earl Spencer, the brother of Princess Diana, both lived in Constantia. Mark's house is now owned by the Sahara Group. The historic Tarrystone House, once owned by Charles Spencer, 9th Earl Spencer was listed for sale at R80 million.

== Wine ==
The area is a major tourist hub. Constantia is a well-known wine-producing area and one of the oldest in the southern hemisphere. It is home to at least ten wine farms, eight of which are included in an official wine route. Numerous operators offer tours of the Constantia wine route where visitors can take part in wine tastings at the farms.

In addition to wine, many Constantia estates also include fine dining restaurants offering both local and international fare. Many of the homesteads along the wine route display Baroque and Cape Dutch architectural styles.

== Education ==
Schools

- Norman Henshilwood High School
- American International School of Cape Town
- Constantia Primary School
- Constantia Waldorf School
- Reddam House Constantia
- The Cape Academy of Maths, Science and Technology

== Coat of arms ==
The Constantia Valley Local Council, which existed from the mid-1980s to the mid-1990s, registered a coat of arms at the Bureau of Heraldry in October 1992.

The arms were : Argent, an eagle displayed Sable, charged on the breast with an hour glass in fess Or; a chief nowy gabled Gules. The crest was a silver demi-stag with golden antlers and black wings emerging from a red mural crown. The motto was Terra hereditas nostra.
