= Constantia Emporium =

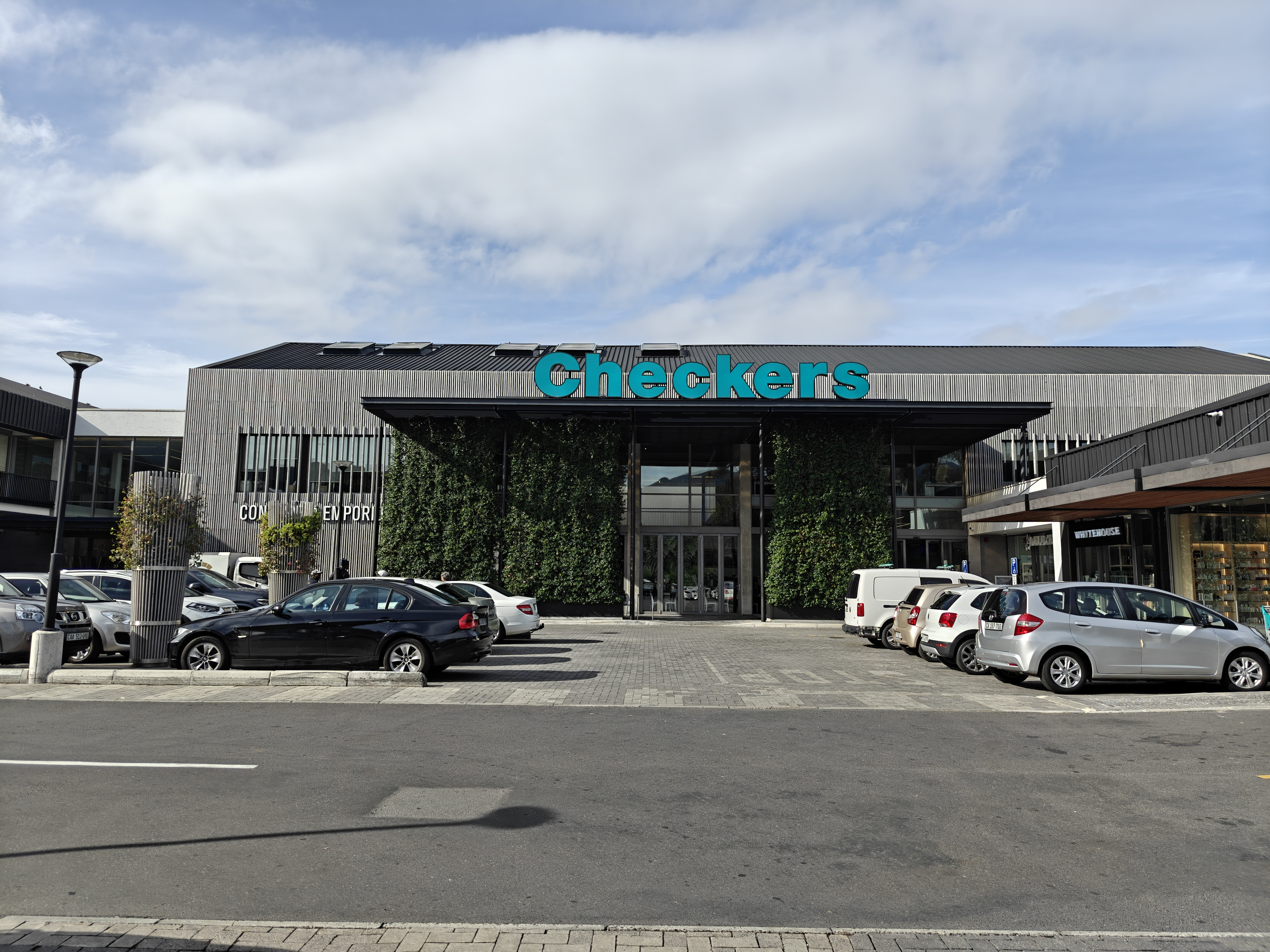

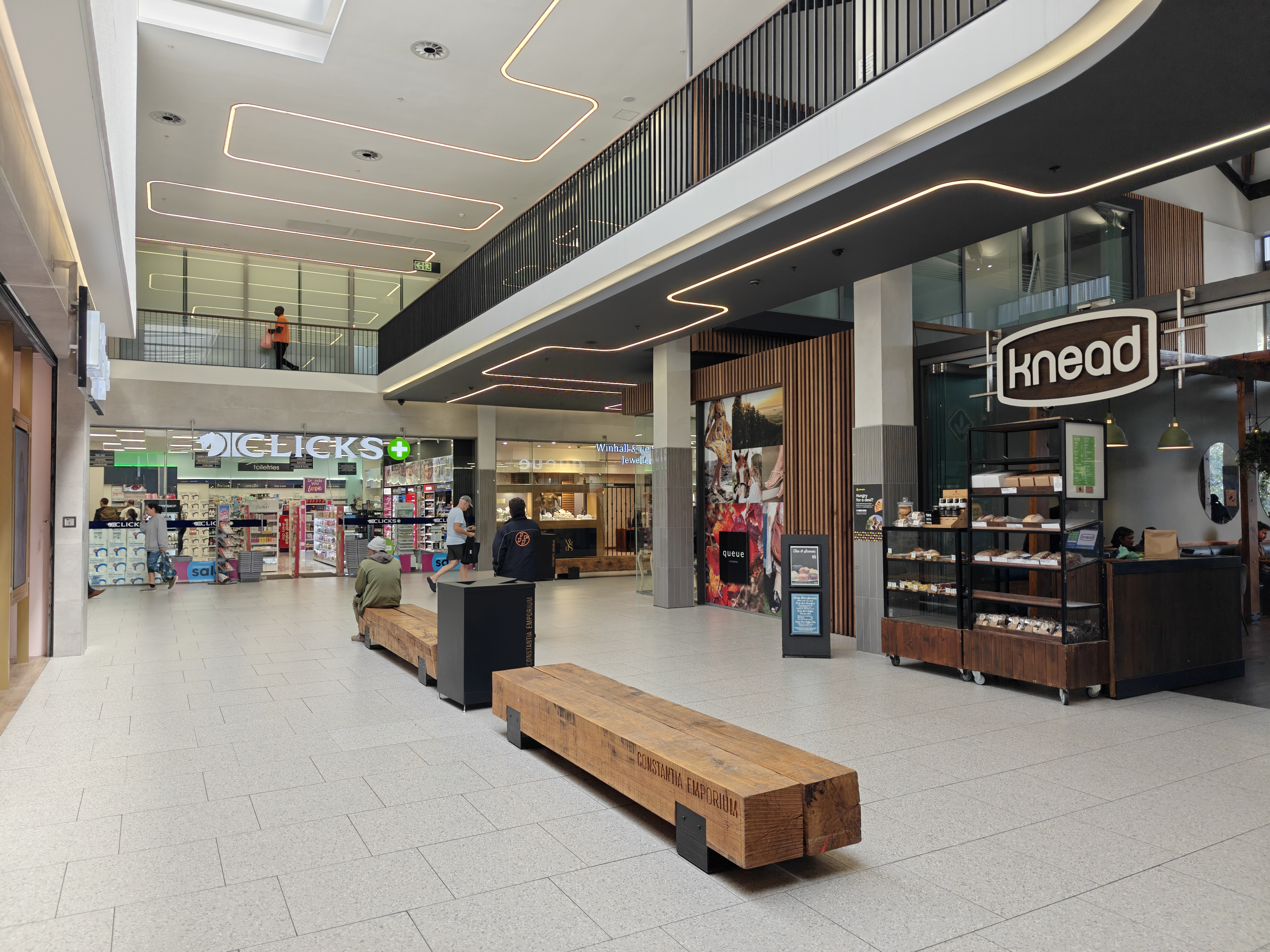
- Above: entrance to Constantia Emporium, in Constantia, Cape Town. Below: stores on the main floor of the shopping center, with double-volume ceiling.

General information
- Type: Shopping center
- Architectural style: Contemporary
- Location: Ladies Mile Road, Constantia, Cape Town, South Africa
- Coordinates: 34.02944819°S 18.44519485°E
- Current tenants: Checkers; Woolworths; Clicks; Knead; Venture Workspace; Others
- Construction started: 2018; 8 years ago
- Opening: 2019; 7 years ago

Height
- Height: 3 stories (1 under ground)

Technical details
- Floor count: 3
- Floor area: 7,900 m^{2} (85,000 sq ft)

Design and construction
- Architect: SV Architects
- Other designers: AECOM (infrastructure consultants)

Other information
- Number of stores: 26

Constantia Emporium is an upmarket shopping center located along Ladies Mile Road in Constantia, Cape Town, South Africa.

The land on which the center is located was taken from its original owners in the 1960s by the apartheid government, after which it was turned into a refuse disposal and recycling site. After around 50 years, the original owners (the Solomon family) won one of the most successful land claim cases in South Africa's history, and received their property back. The family then developed it into the shopping center.

The center, which has won numerous architectural awards, features 26 stores, including a variety of restaurants, a co-working space, and both surface level and underground parking.

== History ==
=== Residential and Farming ===
The land on which Constantia Emporium sits was originally owned by the Solomon family, who purchased it in 1902. It comprises the original Lots 10 and 11 that were part of a Constantia farm, called Sillery. In 1902, these lots were bought by Hajie Abdullah and Saba Owen (Sama'owen) Solomon for 340 and 600 pounds respectively.

The family farmed vegetables and grapes on the site, for both local consumption and export markets. The property was considered to be Constantia's commercial hub, and featured 3 farm stalls (one for fresh produce, one with a butcher, and one with a dairy), where other farmers (of all races) bought provisions and sold their produce.

The trapezoidal site encompasses around 1.5 hectares, and is in a prime location. Estimated to have been worth tens of millions of rands in 2014, it sits on Ladies Mile Road, close to the M3 freeway, in the affluent residential suburb of Constantia, Cape Town.

In the 1960s, the apartheid government took the land from the family, under its racist Group Areas Act, whereby many families across South Africa were displaced. The Act assigned different areas in the country as exclusive to specific races, with preference given to white residents for more desirable areas. Constantia was declared white-only in this system of urban apartheid.

Rashaad Solomon, who was born on the land in 1945, said in 2019 that he still remembered the day he and his family were forcefully evicted from their farm. At the time, there were 30 homes on the farm. The Solomons were moved to Crawford and Rondebosch East, however the family split up, moving to areas including Grassy Park and Wynberg.

=== Refuse and Recycling Depot ===
For decades, the land was used as a City of Cape Town refuse and recycling depot from the 1970s until 2015. City residents had public access to dispose of trash and recyclables at the site, which were processed by local administrators.

=== Restitution ===
For many years, the Solomon family fought to get their land back, by lodging a land restitution application. The family had to pay around R400,000 in legal fees, just to go through the process of officially reclaiming ownership of their own land.

In 2010, around 50 years after their land was taken from them, and after waiting 14 years since they lodged a claim with the Land Claims Commission in 1996, the Solomon family, with the assistance of major South African retail chain Checkers, won a land claim case (one of the most successful in South Africa's history), and they finally received the title deed to their land back in 2012.

The family were the first claimants to receive their land back in Constantia, and in 2014, it was estimated to have been worth tens of millions of rands.

Controversially, the Land Claims Commissioner required a business plan from the Solomon family, as part of the Settlement Agreement. Thus, a proposal for a retail center, featuring a flagship Checkers store, was submitted. The family decided to develop the land into the upmarket Constantia Emporium shopping center. The family believed this would be the best use for the land, and they are still able to own the plot, while leasing stores to tenants as part of the shopping center.

In 2018, the Constantia Ratepayers' and Residents' Association (CRRA), a notoriously restrictive and litigious homeowners' association, took the Solomon Family Trust to court, saying the shopping center did not match the look and feel of Constantia as it was unattractive, and too large. The Solomons decided to move ahead with their Constantia Emporium plans.

Thereafter, the City of Cape Town Municipal Planning Tribunal (MPT) approved the planning application. The CRRA then appealed, but this was rejected by then-Mayor Patricia de Lille, and to the satisfaction of the Solomons, construction went ahead as planned.

Shrif "Solli" Solomon, a member of the owner-family, said in January 2019 that there were around 80 beneficiaries who would benefit from the shopping center.

=== Shopping Center ===
On 23 November 2019, the two family claimants, the Hadjie Abdullah Solomon Family Trust and the Hadjie Ismail Solomon Family Trust, hosted a launch event for Constantia Emporium. The event was a celebration of the family's struggle to reclaim land that was unjustly taken from them. It was attended by social democratic GOOD party leader, Minister of Public Works and Infrastructure, and former Cape Town Mayor, Patricia de Lille.

de Lille remarked, "As we acknowledge our past, we now have an opportunity to design our own future, and this is what the Solomon family has done. They decided to design their own future with their own land. And I can only say, well done."

In October 2026, it was reported that Constantia Emporium, along with a neighboring plot of land, would be sold to property investment group FPG Holdings. The South African Competition Commission approved the deal without conditions, after it noted that the sale would not significantly worsen consumer competition. The transaction value was not disclosed, and FPG did not state its plans for the shopping center or the vacant land.

== Features ==
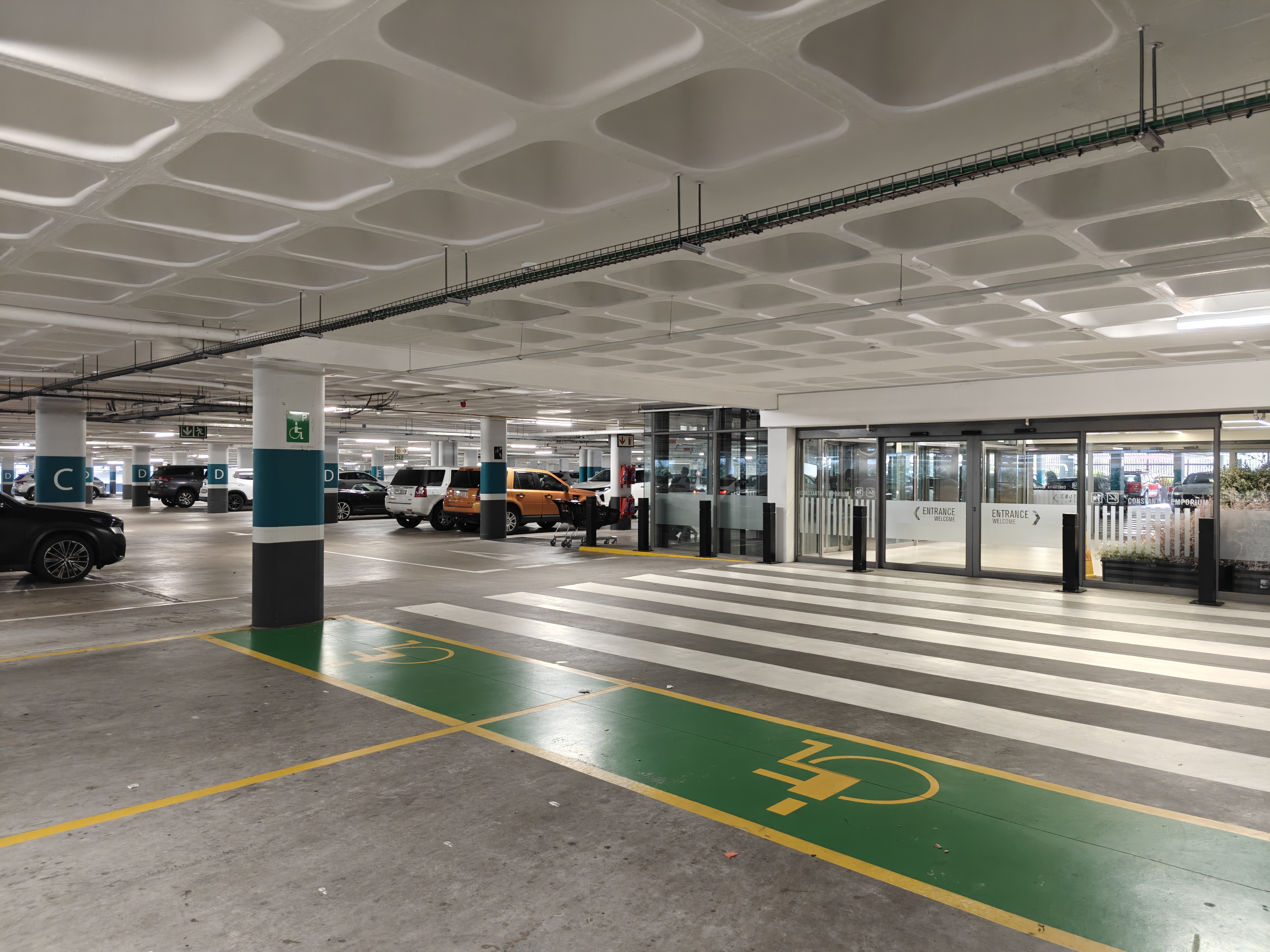
Underground parking underneath the shopping center

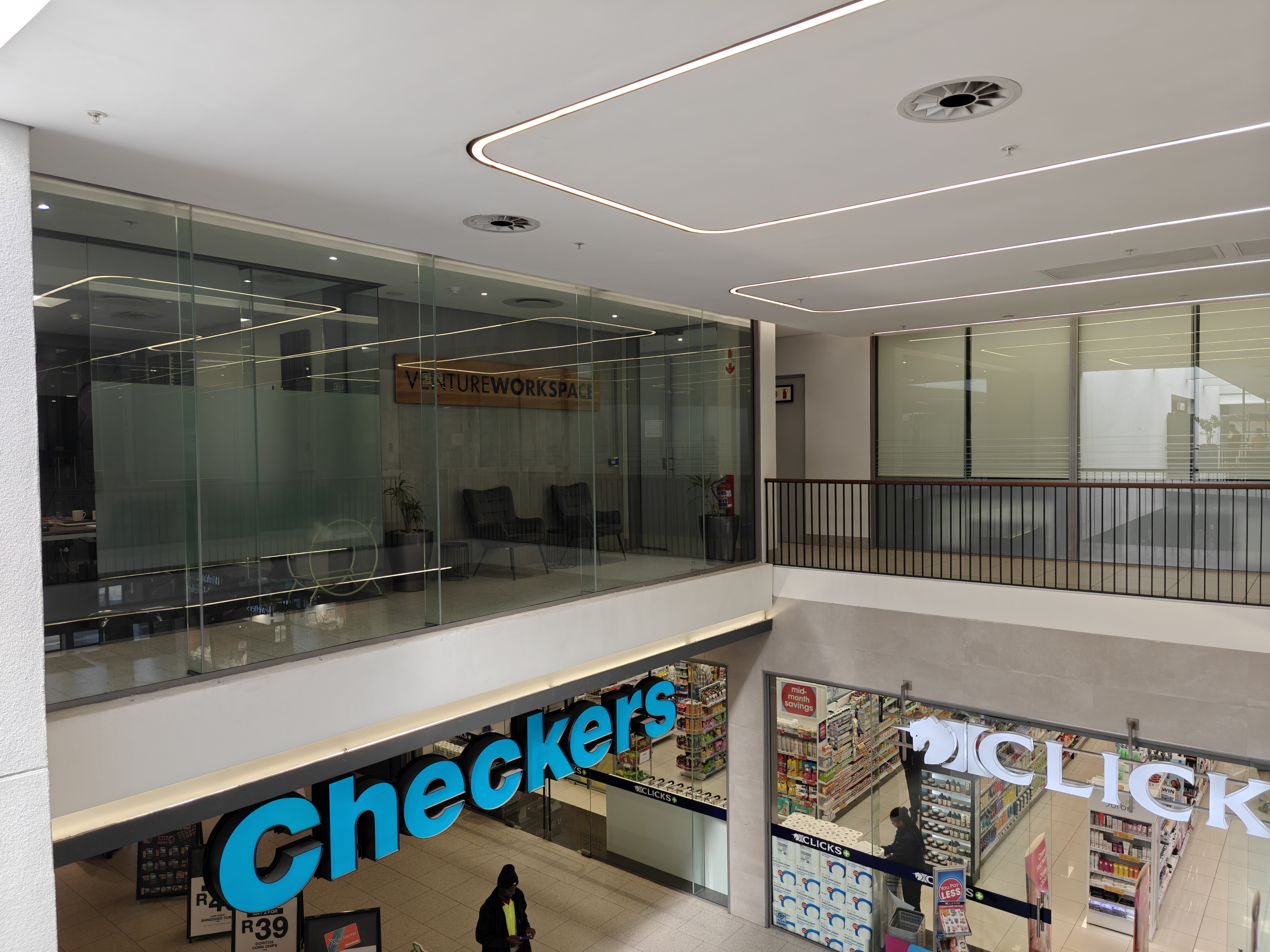
Venture Workspace coworking facility in Constantia Emporium

Constantia Emporium is home to 26 stores, including anchor tenant Checkers, and other large tenants Woolworths, Clicks, Knead, and Venture Workspace.

There is an underground floor for parking (as well as a surface-level parking lot in front of the center), a double-volume first floor comprising exclusively retail outlets, and an upper floor for offices.

The Checkers supermarket is a flagship store for the chain, and is part of its expansion into the high-income-earning market in South Africa. As a result, the store was designed with premium finishes, creating an atmosphere that competes directly with existing upmarket grocery stores from Woolworths.

The 2,330 sqm supermarket follows the launch of Checkers Hyper Sandton City, and aimed to create similar dedicated destination areas within the store, to offer customers an artisanal market experience within a supermarket environment.

As such, the Checkers includes hand-stretched, stone-baked pizzas straight from the oven; freshly-made artisanal breads and pastries; a temperature-controlled tasting room with wines from over 100 leading estates; Wild Pacific salmon caviar served at the sushi bar; a chocolatier bar with hand-crafted chocolates from My Sugar; an in-store Kauai; and an in-store Starbucks.

The store sources many of its products from local, owner-run suppliers, including Schoon bakery, Exotic Taste, the Nut Man, and Soet Cakes.

== Heritage ==
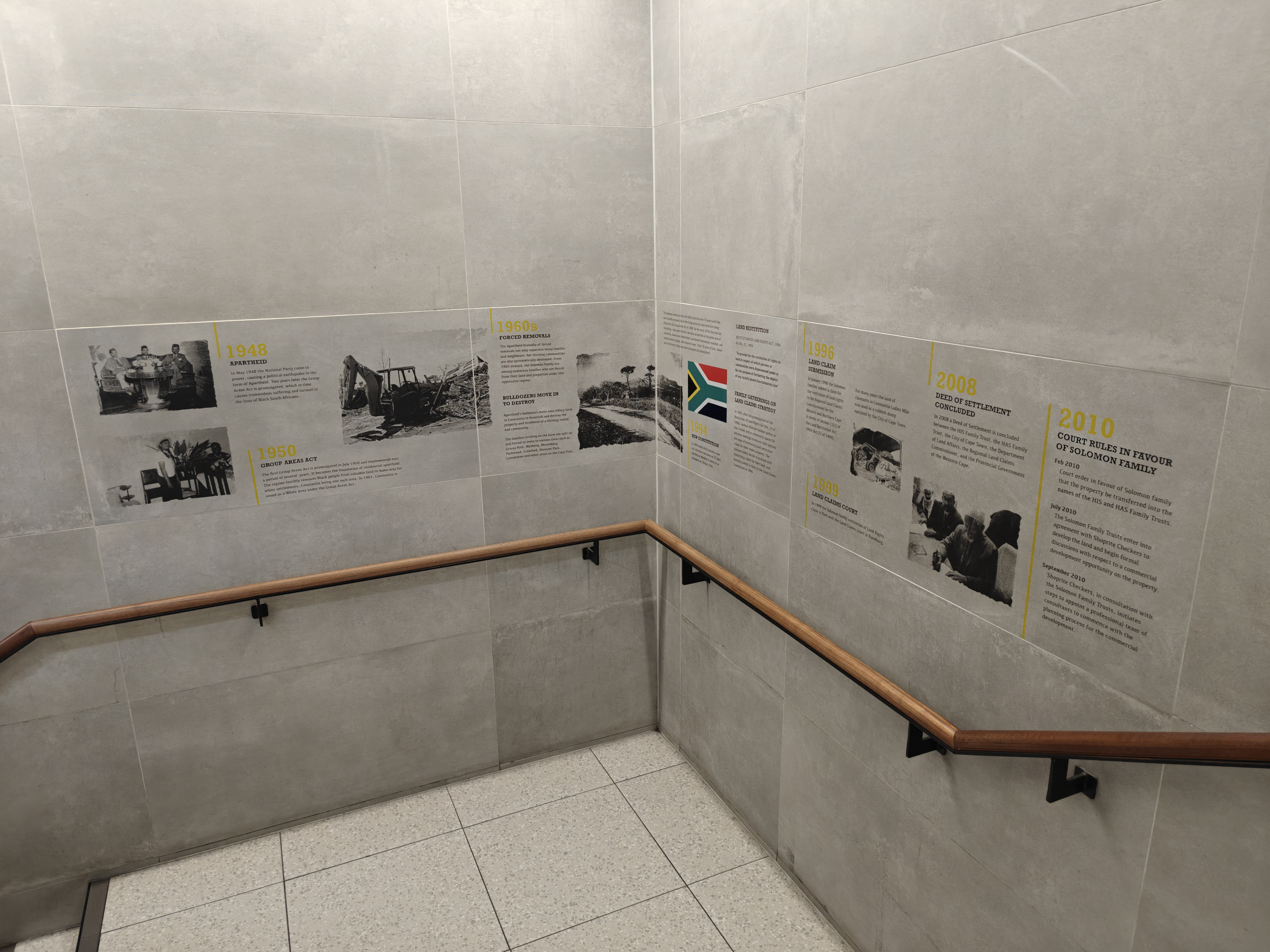
Display in the main stairwell of the shopping center, showing the history of Constantia Emporium

The shopping center features a visual display on the wall to the left of the main stairwell, leading from the underground parking to its first floor. The display features images and information about the family who own the land, and the land's history, up to the development of Constantia Emporium.

== Sustainability ==
Constantia Emporium features extensive solar panels for renewable energy generation, covering around half of the building's roof.

The Checkers supermarket in the center uses 100% recyclable and compostable paper bags, energy-efficient lighting, has established an organic community food garden at the Constantia Primary School, and has partnered with The Ark City of Refuge to collect surplus food from its store.

== Accolades ==
Constantia Emporium was awarded the SAPOA Property Development Award for Innovative Excellence in Retail Development (2020). The South African Property Owners Association (SAPOA) is a member-driven organization, and the industry representative for an around 90% of the South Africa's commercial and industrial real estate companies.

In 2021, the shopping center won the SAPOA Retail Development – Small Boutique Category Award.
