= Kauai (disambiguation) =

Kauai may refer to:

- Kauaʻi, one of the main Hawaiian Islands
- STN MTN / Kauai, a Childish Gambino EP
- Kauai (South Africa), a restaurant chain
