= Paramelita flexa =

Conservation status
- Vulnerable (IUCN 2.3)

Scientific classification
- Kingdom: Animalia
- Phylum: Arthropoda
- Class: Malacostraca
- Order: Amphipoda
- Family: Paramelitidae
- Genus: Paramelita
- Species: P. flexa

Binomial name
- Paramelita flexa Griffiths, 1981

Species of crustacean

Paramelita flexa is a species of crustacean in the family Paramelitidae. It is endemic to South Africa.
