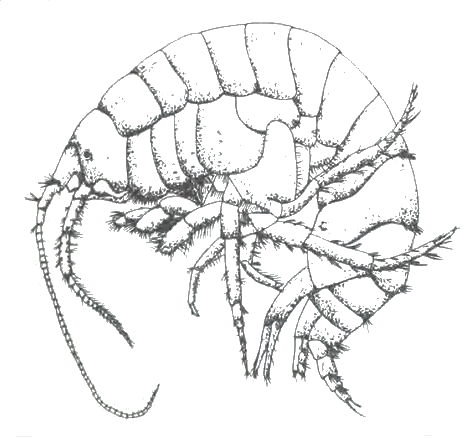

Conservation status
- Critically Endangered (IUCN 3.1)

Scientific classification
- Kingdom: Animalia
- Phylum: Arthropoda
- Clade: Pancrustacea
- Class: Malacostraca
- Order: Amphipoda
- Family: Paramelitidae
- Genus: Austrogammarus
- Species: A. australis

Binomial name
- Austrogammarus australis (Sayce, 1901)

= Austrogammarus australis =

Species of crustacean

Austrogammarus australis, also known as the Dandenong amphipod, is a species of amphipod crustacean in the family Paramelitidae. It is endemic to Australia and until recently thought to be extinct, but surveys conducted in the Dandenong Ranges have revealed small populations. Recent works have been undertaken to improve habitat quality and extend the range of the invertebrate.

Found in the same ecological niche as similar amphipod species, the distinctive "sideways" swimming style and somewhat "hairy" appearance of the amphipod differentiate it. Found in leaf litter at the beginning of small creeks, in at least canopy 75% shade over the water, the species belongs to the shredder feeding guild and occupies the area accordingly, feeding mostly on native detritus and allochthonous materials.
