= Paramelita barnardi =

Conservation status
- Endangered (IUCN 2.3)

Scientific classification
- Kingdom: Animalia
- Phylum: Arthropoda
- Class: Malacostraca
- Order: Amphipoda
- Family: Paramelitidae
- Genus: Paramelita
- Species: P. barnardi

Binomial name
- Paramelita barnardi Thurston, 1973

Species of crustacean

Paramelita barnardi is a species of crustacean in the family Paramelitidae. It is endemic to the Kalk Bay caves of Western Cape South Africa.
