= Constantia Nek =

Low mountain pass

Coordinates: 34°0′43″S 18°24′20″E

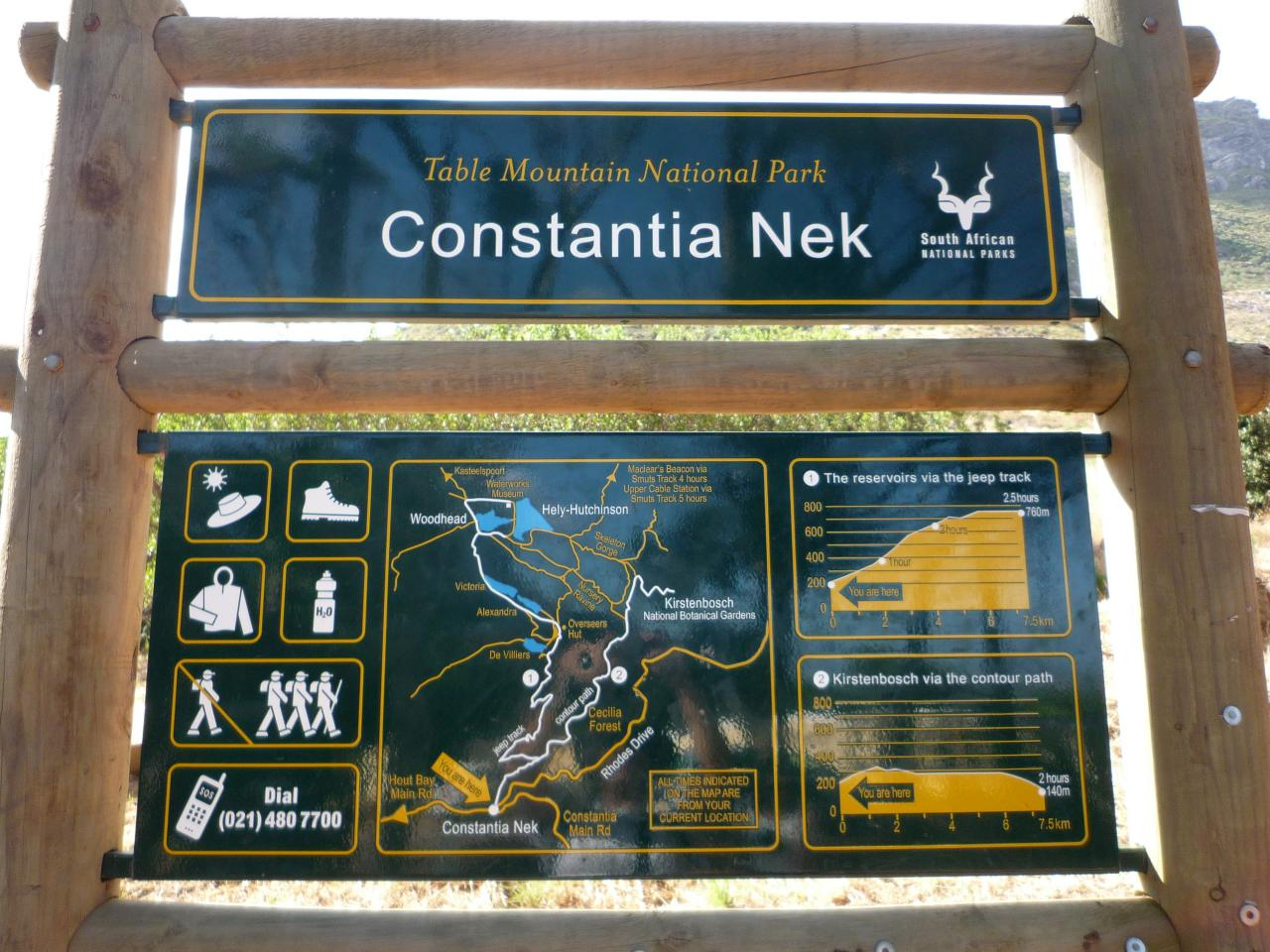

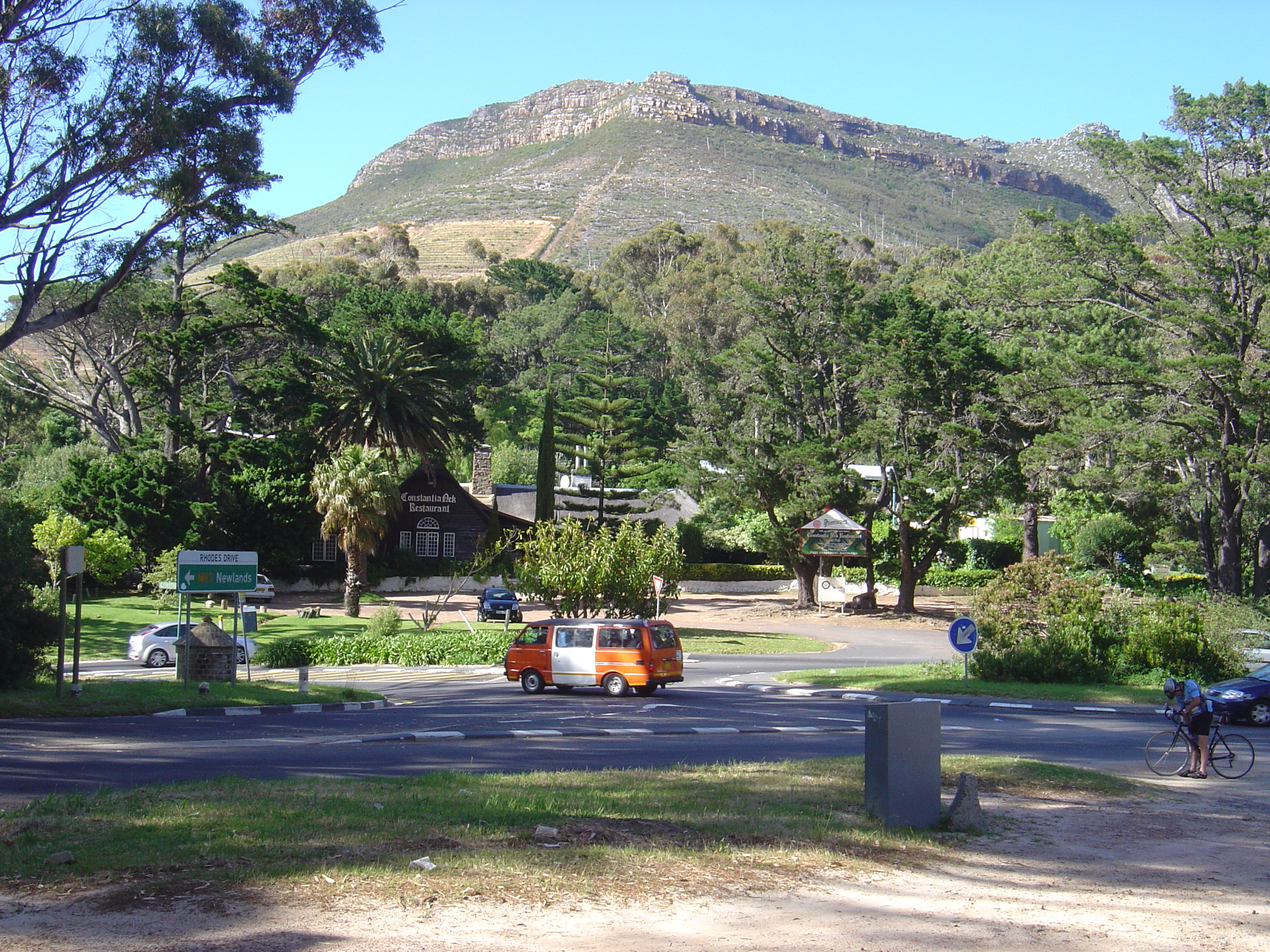
Intersection at Constantia Nek, looking south towards Vlakkenberg

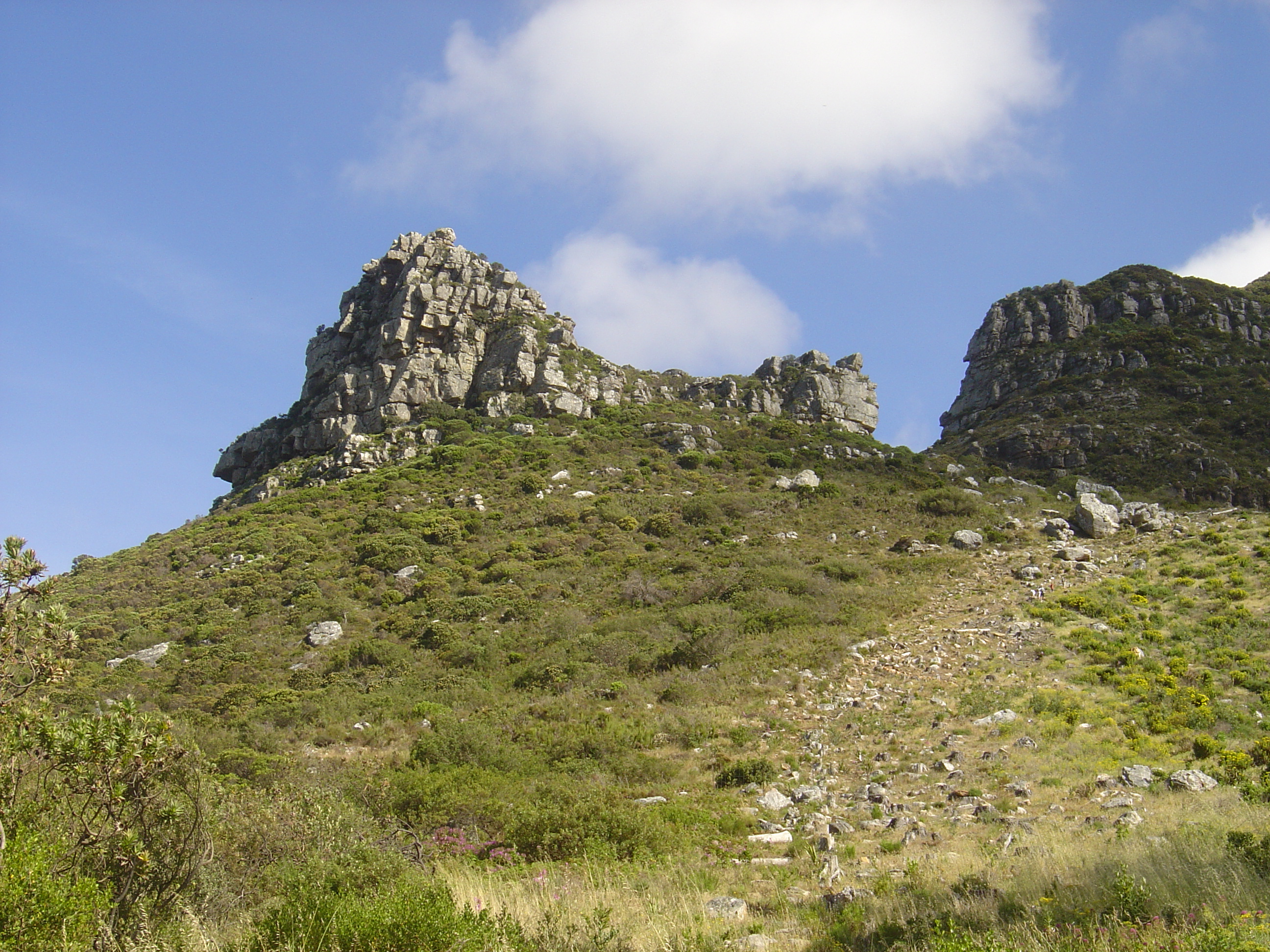
Eagles Nest (421m), a rocky outcrop overlooking Constantia Nek

Constantia Nek is a low pass over the Table Mountain range in Cape Town, South Africa, linking Constantia to Hout Bay in the west.

== Pass ==
It is one of three passes connecting Hout Bay to the rest of the city, and, with Ou Kaapse Weg is one of the two passes over the mountain range between the city centre and the Fish Hoek valley.

The summit of the pass is at 212m. Three roads meet at the summit of the pass: Rhodes Drive, heading north towards the city, Constantia Road, heading towards the Constantia and the southern suburbs, and Hout Bay Main Road, heading into the Hout Bay valley. It is the highest point on the Two Oceans Marathon ultramarathon route.

Many hiking routes start at Constantia Nek. To the south, a path heads over Vlakkenberg towards Constantiaberg. To the north, the Jeep Track (also called the Bridle Path) ascends to the reservoirs on the "back table" of Table Mountain, while the contour path heads into Cecilia Park and northwards towards Kirstenbosch. To the west, a path heads into the restricted area of Orange Kloof.

The pass was called "Clooff Pas" by Jan van Riebeeck when he crossed it on 23 March 1657. Constantia Nek Restaurant, situated at the top of the pass, is the oldest restaurant in Cape Town.

The mountainside at Constantia Nek is covered in Peninsula Granite Fynbos, an endangered vegetation type that is endemic to Cape Town - occurring nowhere else. Another different endangered and endemic vegetation type, Peninsula Sandstone Fynbos, can be found much further up the mountain slopes.
