= FPG Property Fund =

South African real estate investment company

- Trade name: FPG
- Formerly: Foodprop
- Type: Private
- Industry: Real estate investments
- Founded: 1989; 37 years ago
- Headquarters: Cape Town, South Africa
- Number of locations: 59 (2026)
- Area served: South Africa; United Kingdom
- Services: Property investment and development
- Total assets: ▲ R12 billion+ (2026)
- Owner: FPG Investments (90%)
- Number of employees: 137 (2026)
- Subsidiaries: FPG Holdings
- Website: fpggroup.co.za

FPG Property Fund, also referred to simply as FPG, is a South African real estate investment firm, based in Cape Town. Founded in 1989, the company has investments in residential, retail, and other and commercial properties.

As of 2026, FPG has a total of 59 properties in its portfolio, with a combined gross leasable area (GLA) of over 409,000 m². Most of its assets are located in SA. Its total asset value that year was in excess of R12 billion.

== History ==
FPG Property Fund was established in 1989 as Foodprop, a wholly owned subsidiary of the Foodworld Group, then one of the largest independent retail chains operators in the Western Cape. Foodprop was established to develop a property-owning entity that could source sites for Foodworld's retail operations while also building a broader portfolio of industrial and office properties. Its first acquisition was a tenanted retail property in Bishop Lavis, Cape Town, which the company continues to own.

In 2006, the company completed The Claremont, a R300 million residential development comprising 322 condos in Claremont, Cape Town. It was the company's largest single development at the time and represented an expansion beyond its predominantly retail property activities.

In 2012, the group made its first overseas property acquisition with the purchase of a retail property in Rugby, England. In 2013, the company rebranded as the FPG Group to reflect its broader focus across property sectors and its expanding international activities.

By 2015, FPG had grown to a portfolio of 38 properties, primarily in the retail sector, with more than 160,000 m² of gross lettable area. That year, Nedbank Property Finance provided R323 million in financing for FPG's acquisition of the Cape Gate Lifestyle precinct from Hyprop, comprising six properties with a combined gross lettable area of approximately 30,000 m².

In 2020, FPG Holdings acquired Tokai Junction in Tokai, Cape Town, from Fairvest Property Holdings for R180 million. The 7,618 m² retail center became part of FPG's growing convenience-retail portfolio.

From 2024, FPG expanded its portfolio through a series of acquisitions from major South African retail corporation Shoprite Holdings. In September 2024, FPG Holdings acquired the Drakenstein Centre in Paarl, a 9,000 m² shopping center that had been developed by Shoprite Holdings. In November 2024, FPG acquired Sandown Retail Crossing in Parklands, Cape Town.

In February 2025, the South African Competition Commission recommended approval of FPG's proposed acquisition of Sitari Village Centre in Somerset West. The approximately 12,000 m² neighborhood shopping center formed part of the Sitari Country Estate development, and represented another expansion of FPG's retail portfolio in the Western Cape.

In 2026, FPG developed Olive Crest Estate, a residential development in Plattekloof, Cape Town, featuring 59 homes.

That same year, it was reported that the Competition Commission had approved a deal for FPG to acquire Constantia Emporium, an upmarket shopping center in Constantia, Cape Town, as well as a neighboring plot of land.

== Operations ==
As of 2026, FPG has 59 investment properties in its portfolio, across a mix of commercial, retail-specific, and residential real estate. These properties include:

Property name	Property type	Location	Developed *	Ref
Claremont Apartments	Residential	Cape Town, Western Cape	2005; 21 years ago	
Bothasig Mall	Retail	Cape Town, Western Cape	1980s; 45 years ago	
Laguna Mall	Retail	Langebaan, Western Cape	2023; 3 years ago	
Moreleta Corner	Retail	Pretoria, Gauteng	2024; 2 years ago	
Sandown Retail Crossing	Retail	Cape Town, Western Cape	2025; 1 year ago	
Somerset Square	Retail	Cape Town, Western Cape	2019; 7 years ago	
Stelmark Centre	Retail	Stellenbosch, Western Cape	2021; 5 years ago	
Willowbridge Village	Retail	Cape Town, Western Cape	2021; 5 years ago	
Parow Valley	Mixed-use	Cape Town, Western Cape	2012; 14 years ago	
Ronsyn Building	Mixed-use	Cape Town, Western Cape	2023; 3 years ago	

* The year of the completion of construction. This may differ from the year of acquisition by FPG
