= Paramelita =

Scientific classification
- Domain: Eukaryota
- Kingdom: Animalia
- Phylum: Arthropoda
- Class: Malacostraca
- Order: Amphipoda
- Family: Paramelitidae
- Genus: Paramelita; Schellenberg, 1926

Type species
- Paramelita ctenodactyla Schellenberg, 1926

Genus of crustaceans

Paramelita is a genus of crustaceans in the family Paramelitidae, containing the following species:

- Paramelita aurantius (K. H. Barnard, 1927)
- Paramelita barnardi Thurston, 1973
- Paramelita capensis (K. H. Barnard, 1916)
- Paramelita flexa Griffiths, 1981
- Paramelita granulicornis (K. H. Barnard, 1927)
- Paramelita kogelensis (K. H. Barnard, 1927)
- Paramelita magna Stewart & Griffiths, 1992
- Paramelita magnicornis Stewart & Griffiths, 1992
- Paramelita nigroculus (K. H. Barnard, 1916)
- Paramelita odontophora Stewart, Snaddon & Griffiths, 1994
- Paramelita parva Stewart & Griffiths, 1992
- Paramelita persetosus (K. H. Barnard, 1927)
- Paramelita pillicornis Stewart & Griffiths, 1992
- Paramelita pinnicornis Stewart & Griffiths, 1992
- Paramelita platypus Stewart & Griffiths, 1992
- Paramelita seticornis (K. H. Barnard, 1927)
- Paramelita spinicornis (K. H. Barnard, 1927)
- Paramelita triangula Griffiths & Stewart, 1996
- Paramelita tulbaghensis (K. H. Barnard, 1927)
- Paramelita validicornis Stewart & Griffiths, 1992
