= Cape Academy of Mathematics, Science and Technology =

Public school in Cape Town, South Africa

The Cape Academy of Mathematics, Science and Technology (Cape Academy)

Location
- Firgrove Way, Tokai; Cape Town, Western Cape; South Africa; 34°2′53″S 18°25′44″E

Information
- School type: Public & Boarding
- Motto: Praestantia
- Religious affiliation: Christianity
- Established: 19 January 2004; 22 years ago
- School district: District 9
- School number: 021 794 5104
- Principal: Mrs Emily Naidu
- Grades: 8–12
- Gender: Boys & Girls
- Age: 13 to 18
- Language: English
- Schedule: 07:30 - 15:00
- Campus: Urban Campus
- Campus type: Suburban
- Colours: Navy; Orange; White
- Nickname: CAMST
- Affiliation: Western Cape Education Department
- Website: www.camst.co.za

The Cape Academy of Mathematics, Science and Technology, often abbreviated to "Cape Academy" or "CAMST", is a co-educational public boarding school, situated in the Constantia Valley of Cape Town, South Africa. The Cape Academy was founded in 2004 by the Western Cape Education Department to offer quality instruction in the sciences to students from previously disadvantaged backgrounds, as part of the government's strategy to fill the skills gap present in South Africa.

== Establishment ==
The Cape Academy was established in 2004 at the site of an old reformatory, the Constantia School for Boys, as initiative by the local education department to improve the results of previously disadvantaged learners in the National Senior Certificate examinations. It officially opened its doors on 19 January 2004, with an address by the then Western Cape Premier, Marthinus van Schalkwyk. The establishment of the school initially cost the Western Cape Department of Education more than R5 million.

== Academics ==
The Cape Academy enrolls students into the Further Education and Training educational phase, educating students from grades 8 to 12. Both English and Afrikaans are offered as languages of instruction. Its grade 12 students write the Western Cape Education Department matric examinations in November each year.

Subjects offered include:

- Mathematics
- Physical Science
- Life Sciences
- Information technology (IT)
- Computer applications technology (CAT)
- Accounting
- Life Orientation
- English
- isiXhosa
- Afrikaans
- Mandarin
- Aviation, Aeronautics and Avionics

For learners in the FET, Physical Sciences is a compulsory subject, from which students can only choose two of the following subjects: either Geography, Life Science and Accounting or CAT and IT. Aviation, Aeronautics and Avionics are a extracurricular activity and can only be attended after the school day is over. In accordance with South African educational policy students all take at least one language as their home language and another as an additional language. The Cape Academy is a parallel medium school, offering all courses in both English and Afrikaans.

Mandarin was introduced as a subject in 2010, through the Confucius Institute, the first of its kind in a South African school. The new classroom was opened in March 2010 by the Chinese Consul General, Hao Guangwei.

== Rankings ==
In a 2009 report a South African newspaper, the Sunday Times, listed the Cape Academy as one of the top 100 public schools in the country, based on the previous year's maths and science results in the National Senior Certificate examinations. The Cape Academy was also noted as one of only five schools on the list which were not formerly model C schools. The Cape Academy was also ranked second in Physical Science and fourth in Mathematics in South Africa, despite having only registered its first matrics in 2006. The rankings were based on the percentage of learners in each school who attained a grade of 50% or more in the NSC examinations, in the subjects of mathematics and physical science.
