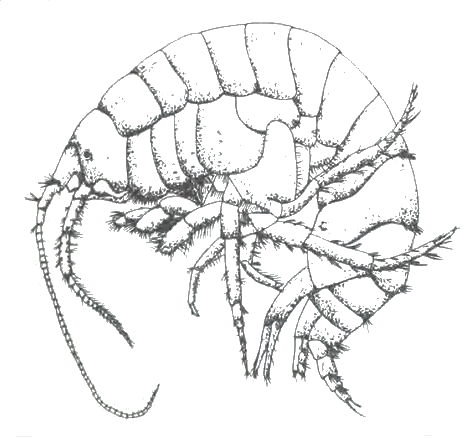
- Austrogammarus australis

Scientific classification
- Domain: Eukaryota
- Kingdom: Animalia
- Phylum: Arthropoda
- Class: Malacostraca
- Order: Amphipoda
- Family: Paramelitidae
- Genus: Austrogammarus; Barnard & Karaman, 1983

Type species
- Gammarus australis Sayce, 1901

= Austrogammarus =

Genus of crustaceans

Austrogammarus is a genus of crustaceans in the family Paramelitidae. It contains the following species:

- Austrogammarus australis (Sayce, 1901)
- Austrogammarus haasei (Sayce, 1902)
- Austrogammarus multispinatus Williams & Barnard, 1988
- Austrogammarus saycei Williams & Barnard, 1988
- Austrogammarus smithi Williams & Barnard, 1988
- Austrogammarus spinatus Williams & Barnard, 1988
- Austrogammarus telsosetosus Bradbury & Williams, 1995
