= Aquadulcaris =

Scientific classification
- Domain: Eukaryota
- Kingdom: Animalia
- Phylum: Arthropoda
- Class: Malacostraca
- Order: Amphipoda
- Family: Paramelitidae
- Genus: Aquadulcaris; Stewart & Griffiths, 1995

Type species
- Gammarus crassicornis K. H. Barnard, 1916

Genus of crustaceans

Aquadulcaris is a genus of crustaceans in the family Paramelitidae, containing the following species:

- Aquadulcaris andronyx (Stewart & Griffiths, 1992)
- Aquadulcaris auricularius (K. H. Barnard, 1916)
- Aquadulcaris crassicornis (K. H. Barnard, 1916)
- Aquadulcaris dentata (Stewart & Griffiths, 1992)
- Aquadulcaris marunuguis (Stewart & Griffiths, 1992)
- Aquadulcaris pheronyx (Stewart & Griffiths, 1992)
