= Constantiaberg =

Mountain on the Cape Peninsula, South Africa

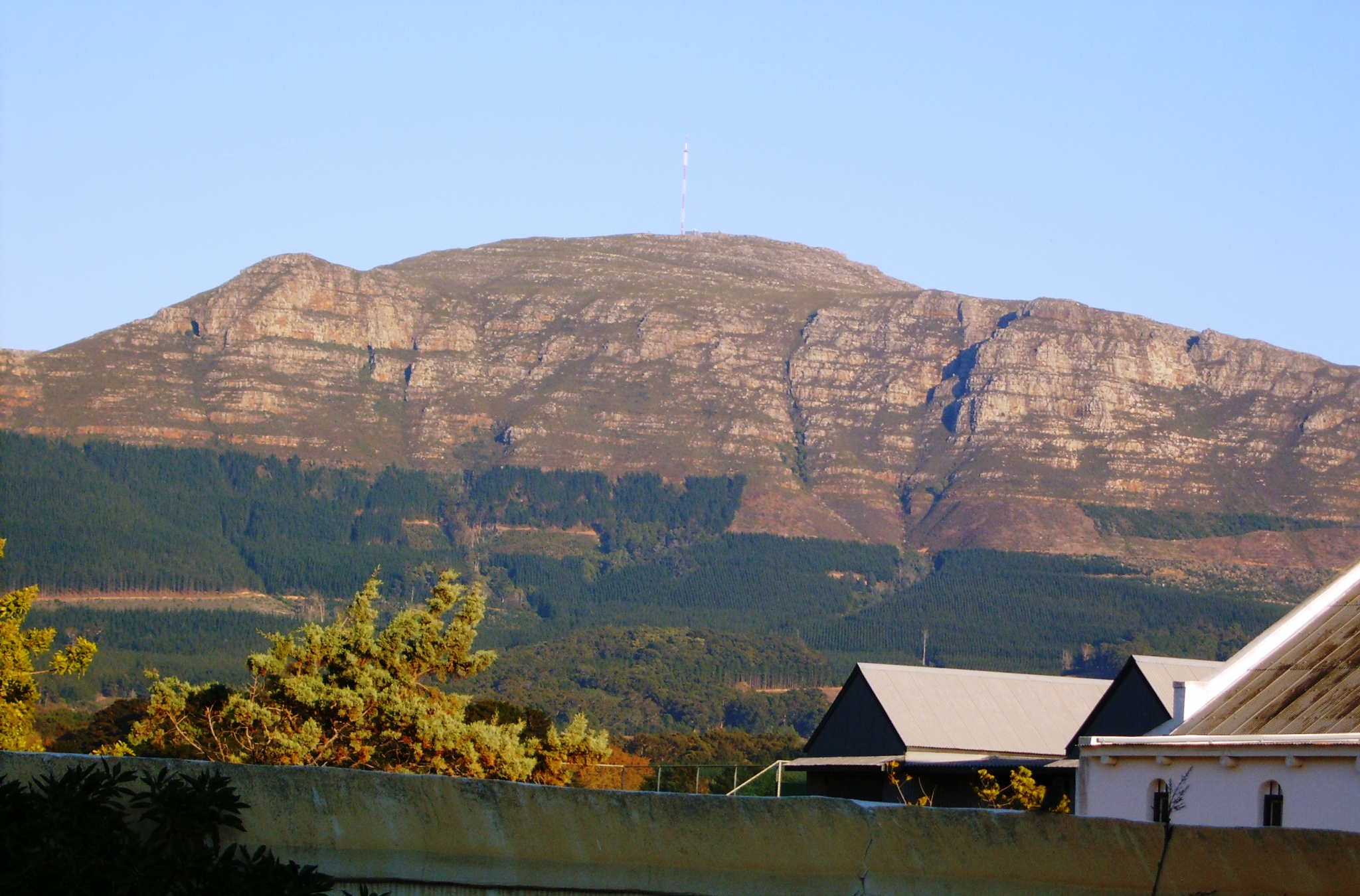
- Constantiaberg from the east. Just visible at the summit is the radio mast. Elephant's Eye cave appears as a black dot on the left. Note the ancient, slightly tilted strata of the sandstones of the Table Mountain Group

Highest point
- Elevation: 927 m (3,041 ft)
- Coordinates: 34°03′15″S 18°23′8″E

Geography
- Location: Cape Town, South Africa

Geology
- Rock age: Silurian/Ordovician
- Mountain type: Sandstone

Climbing
- Easiest route: Silvermine Nature Reserve

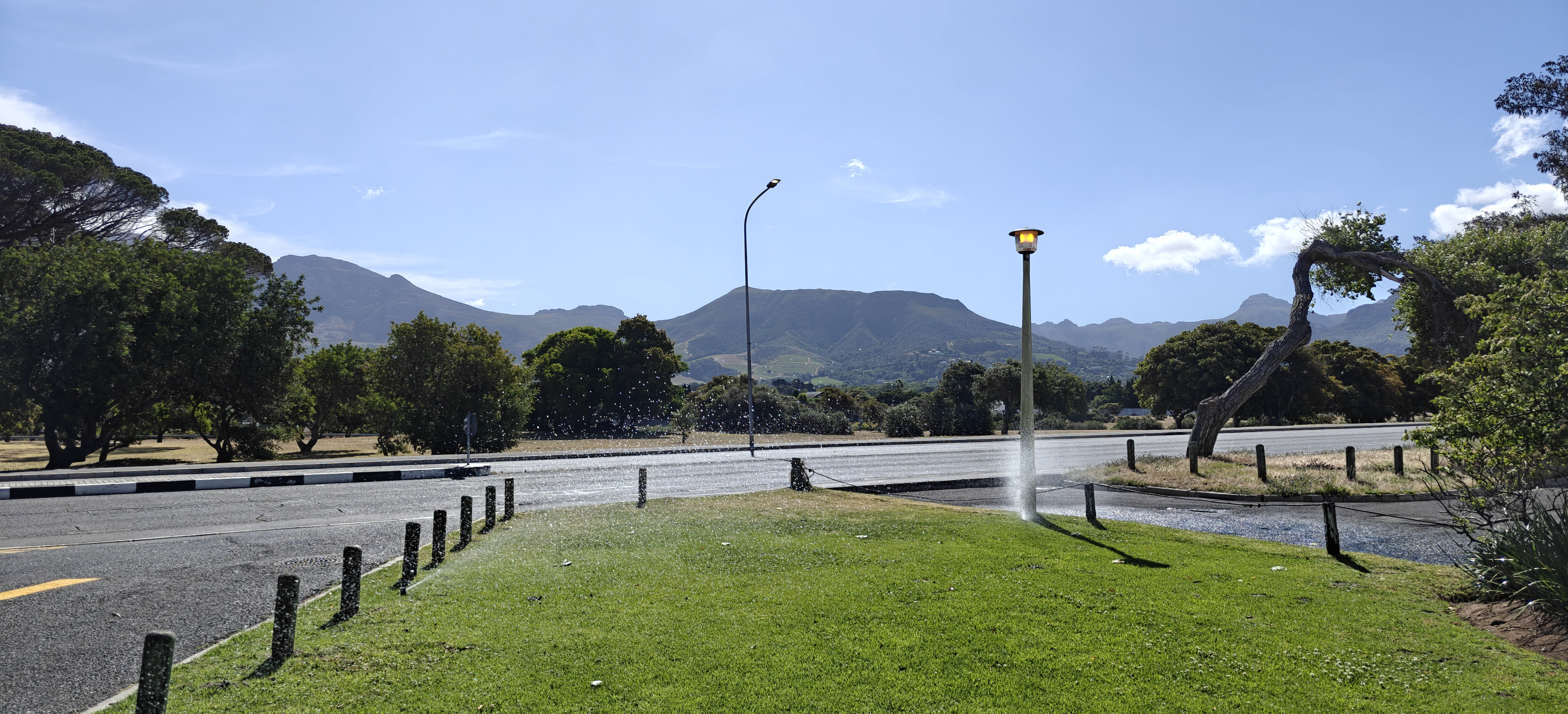
Constantiaberg and the Constantia Winelands viewed from Meadowridge, Cape Town

Constantiaberg is a large, whale-backed mountain that forms part of the mountainous spine of the Cape Peninsula in Table Mountain National Park, Cape Town, South Africa. It lies about 7 km south of Table Mountain, on the southern side of Constantia Nek. The mountain is 927 m high. It is not known who first ascended the peak.

Constantiaberg, Devil's Peak and Table Mountain are the highest mountains in the range that stretches from Table Mountain all the way to Cape Point. The range, made up of resistant sandstones of the Table Mountain Group, dominates the southern suburbs of the city on the verge of the Cape Flats.

The lower eastern slopes of Constantiaberg are covered by the commercial pine and gum plantations of Tokai forest, and are crisscrossed with hiking trails and gravel roads that are used for harvesting the trees. The forest is popular for walking, running and mountain biking.

The western slopes of the mountain overlook the magnificent scenery of Hout Bay.

A tarred road leads to the summit of Constantiaberg, where an important VHF mast is located 34°03′17.78″S 18°23′10.77″E. The mast is 148 m high and is visible for perhaps 80 kilometers in any direction. It was constructed in 1962 and is used to transmit signals for many local television and radio channels, and also to support cellular networks. The South African Weather Service has a radar installation at the summit.

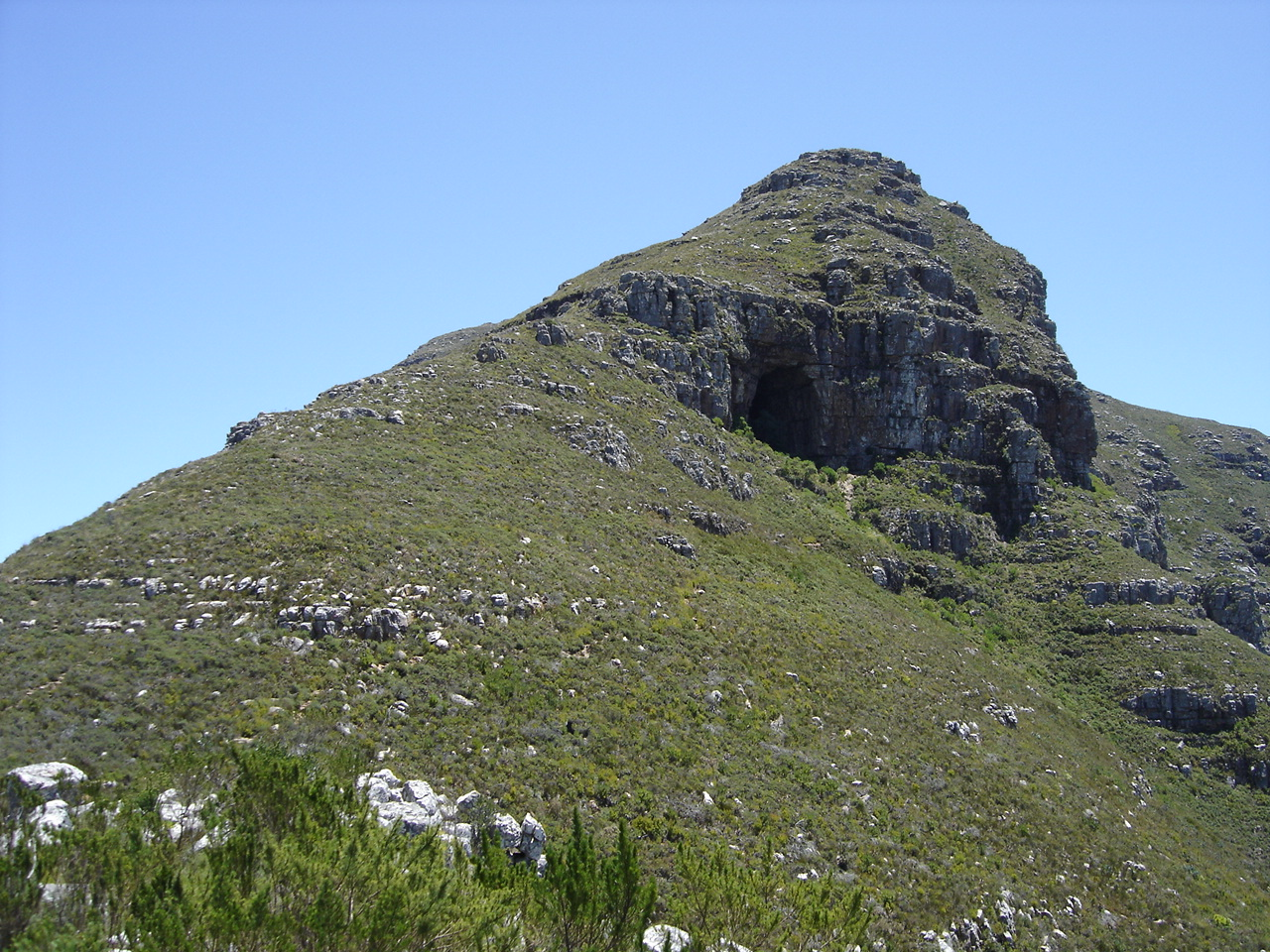
Elephant's Eye Cave, as seen from the fire lookout station

Constantiaberg is home to a variety of bird and plant species. The mountain is covered mainly by fynbos, a botanical biome native to the Western Cape. The specific vegetation type of the mountain is Peninsula Sandstone Fynbos, an endangered vegetation type that is endemic to the city of Cape Town - occurring nowhere else in the world.

Elephant's Eye cave, a popular hiking destination, is the mountain's biggest feature after the mast. This is visible near the southern end of the mountain when viewed from the Cape Flats. Elephant's Eye is so named because the eastern profile of the mountain resembles an elephant (the range that continues toward Cape Point being the trunk).
