= Kauai (South Africa) =

South African takeout chain

- Type: Private
- Industry: Takeout
- Founded: 1996; 30 years ago
- Headquarters: Cape Town, South Africa
- Number of locations: 200 (2023)
- Area served: South Africa; Australia; Italy; Thailand; United Kingdom; Botswana; Namibia
- Products: Food; Beverages
- Parent: Real Foods (100%)
- Website: kauai.co.za

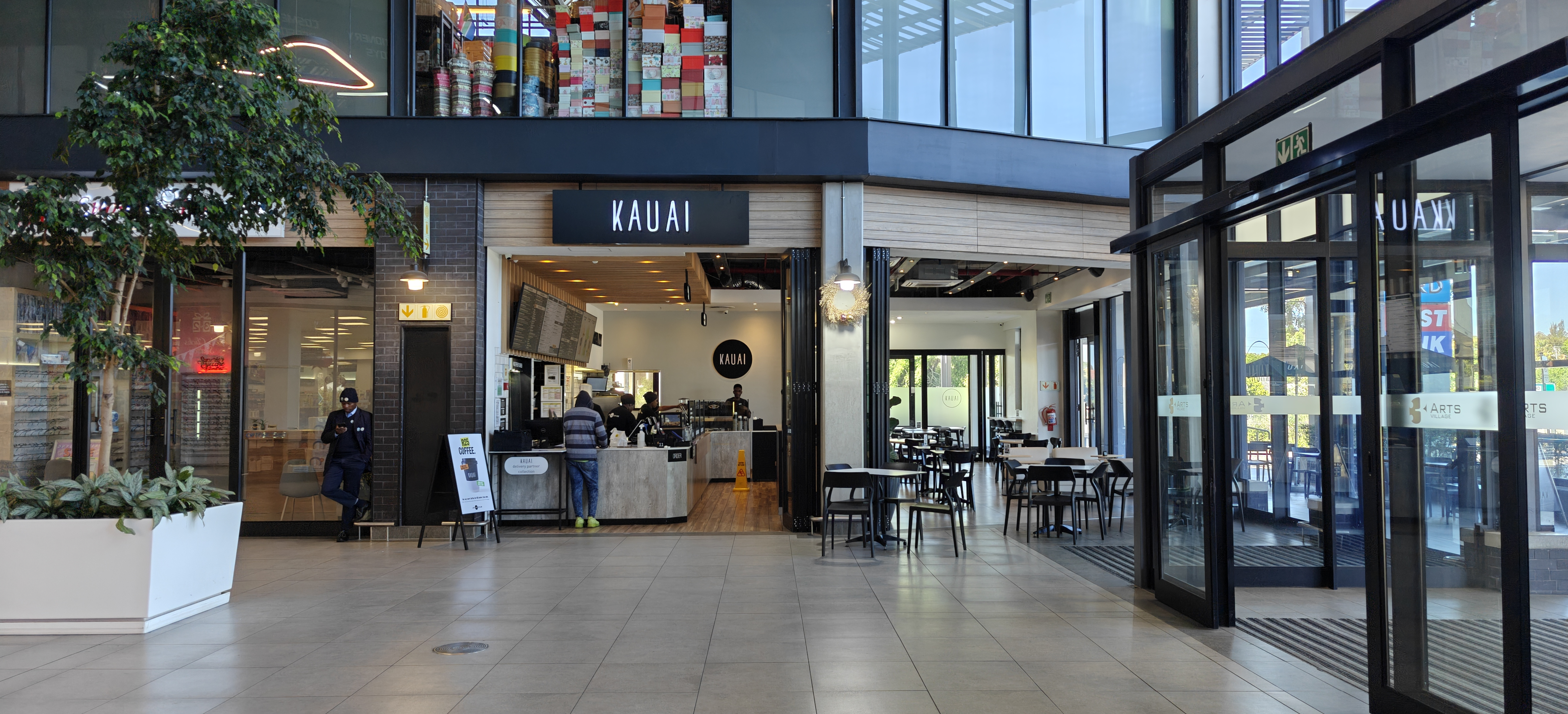
Kauai store in 3Arts Village, Plumstead, Cape Town

Kauai is a South African restaurant chain, focused on healthy food options. Founded and headquartered in Cape Town in 1996, it is owned by Real Foods, which itself is owned by Virgin Active South Africa. Kauai operates 200 locations across seven countries around the world.

The company is considered to have introduced smoothies and popularized wraps in the South African market.

== History ==
Kauai was founded in 1996 by three friends, who had previously resided on the Hawaiian island of Kauaʻi. When the idea for the chain was conceived, the friends were living in tents in a papaya field on Kauaʻi, running a bottled-juice company.

The friends, John Berry, and brothers Carl and Brett Harwin, visited South Africa in 1995. Surprised at the lack of convenient, healthy food options, and returning to their freshly-squeezed juice factory, they formulated the idea to found the Kauai chain, believing that there was a market for juice, smoothies, and related healthy food in South Africa.

In 2011, Kauai had 95 stores in total, across South Africa.

In 2015, food company Real Foods bought a 100% shareholding in Kauai. At the time, the latter operated 154 stores. It was announced that the same time that Kauai would undergo rebranding. Real Foods CEO Dean Kowarski became Kauai's CEO.

In 2018, after operating for 22 years, Kauai reported its best sales year, with a 25% year-on-year growth. At the time, the store also announced it was open to new franchisees, as part of a South African expansion plan. The price of opening one of its franchises in that year included approximately R2 million in capital, a R120,000 franchising fee, and employee training costs of R30,000.

In 2019, Kauai launched its first stores outside of Southern Africa. The company opened a store inside a Virgin Active gym in Whizdom 101, Bangkok, Thailand, as well as an outlet in Utrecht, inside Utrecht Centraal, the Netherlands' busiest train station. For each new location, Kauai kept the majority of its menu the same, but added some local flavors.

Also in 2019, the company launched its own app, enabling customers to order up to 20 minutes ahead of collection, as well as earn rewards points for purchases.

In 2022, after approval from the South African Competition Commission, major gym chain Virgin Active South Africa acquired Real Foods for R1.8 billion. At the time, Virgin SA operated over 230 gyms and had around 1 million members globally. Kowarski became Virgin SA's CEO a year later.

In December 2023, Kauai opened its 200th store.

== Operations ==
Kauai operates 200 outlets across seven countries, namely South Africa, Australia, Italy, Thailand, the United Kingdom, Botswana, and Namibia. It does so via company-owned and franchise locations.

The company has a partnership with gym franchise Virgin Active, to host Kauai outlets inside specific gyms.

Kauai also creates school menus, and as of November 2025, has operations at the American International School Cape Town, and Parklands College.

== Corporate social responsibility ==
As part of its sustainability initiatives, Kauai offers paper and corn starch plastic straws at its outlets, as well as beverage containers made from 100% recycled material.
