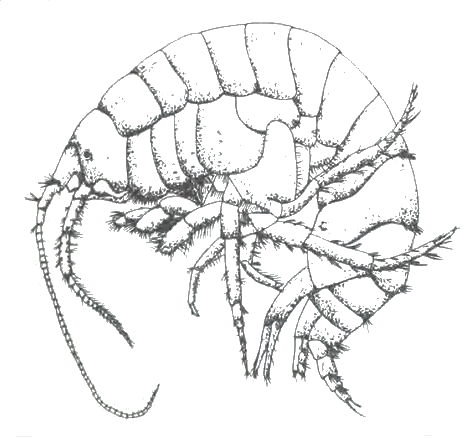
- Austrogammarus australis

Scientific classification
- Kingdom: Animalia
- Phylum: Arthropoda
- Clade: Pancrustacea
- Class: Malacostraca
- Order: Amphipoda
- Suborder: Senticaudata
- Infraorder: Gammarida
- Parvorder: Crangonyctidira
- Superfamily: Crangonyctoidea
- Family: Paramelitidae; Bousfield, 1977

= Paramelitidae =

Family of crustaceans

Paramelitidae is a family of amphipods, containing the following genera:

- Antipodeus Williams & Barnard, 1988
- Aquadulcaris Stewart & Griffiths, 1995
- Austrocrangonyx Barnard & Barnard, 1983
- Austrogammarus Barnard & Karaman, 1983
- Chydaekata Bradbury, 2000
- Giniphargus Karaman & Barnard, 1979
- Hurleya Straskraba, 1966
- Kruptus Finston, Johnson & Knott, 2008
- Mathamelita Stewart & Griffiths, 1995
- Molina Bradbury, 2000
- Paramelita Schellenberg, 1926
- Pilbarus Bradbury & Williams, 1997
- Protocrangonyx Nicholls, 1927
- Totgammarus Bradbury & Williams, 1995
- Toulrabia Barnard & Williams, 1995
- Uroctena Nicholls, 1926
