= Tygerberg =

Region of the City of Cape Town, South Africa

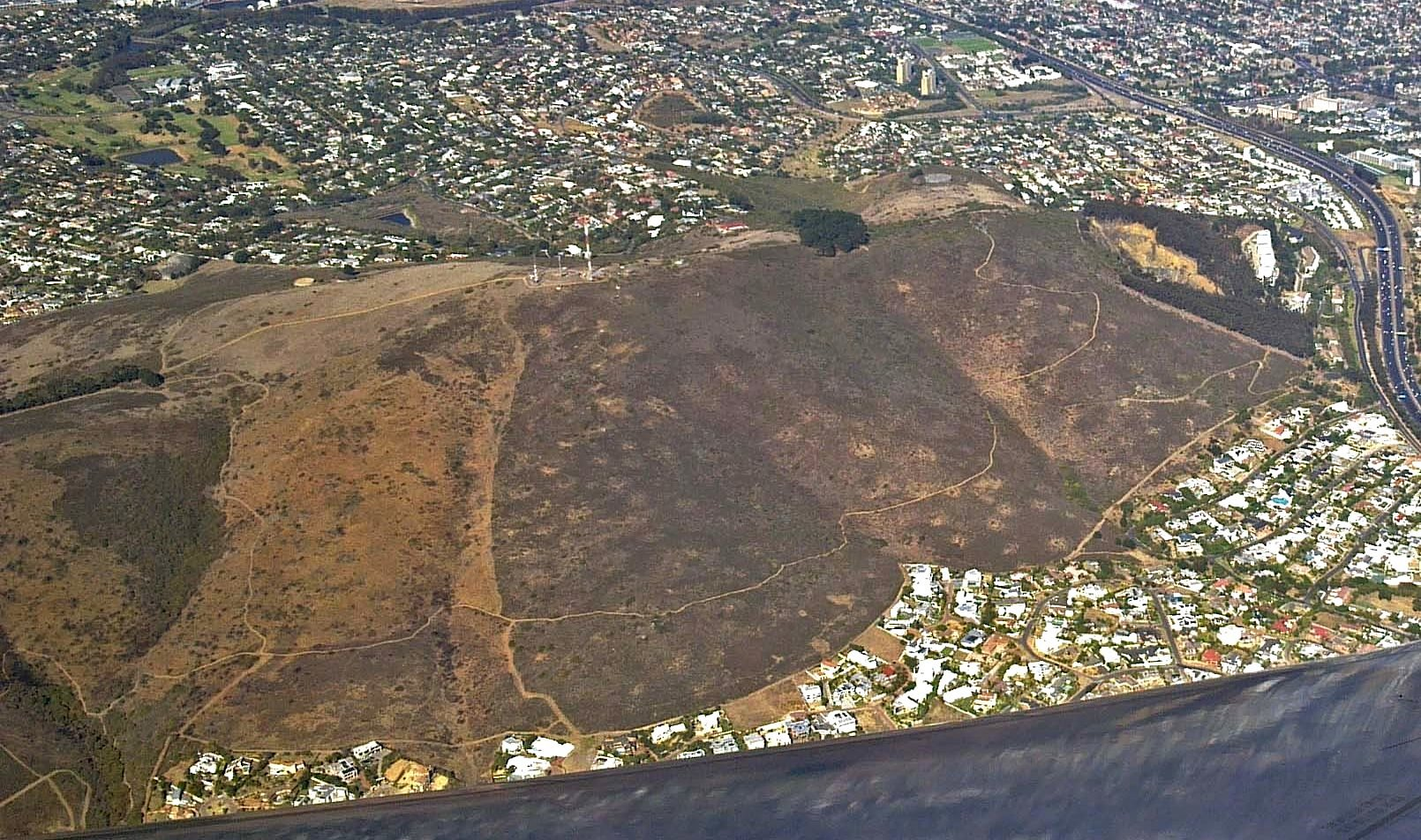
- Aerial view of Tygerberg Nature Reserve in the southernmost Tierberg. The Plattekloof and Welgemoed (above) suburbs flank the mountain, while the N1 highway skirts its southern limit.

- Location within Western Cape Location within South Africa
- Coordinates: 33°51′16″S 18°35′3″E
- Country: South Africa
- Province: Western Cape
- Municipality: City of Cape Town
- Time zone: UTC+2 (SAST)
- PO box: 7505

Tygerberg is a region in the Northern Suburbs of the city of Cape Town, South Africa, and is also the name of the range of hills in the area. Most of the area is the Tygerberg Nature Reserve.

== Geography ==
The main Tygerberg farms were Pampoenkraal (became Durbanville), Stellenburgh (became part of Bellville), Evertsdal (became part of Bellville), De Grendel (today Parow), Lebenstijn (part of Bellville), Blommensteijn (incorporated into Bellville), Door de Kraal (incorporated into Bellville), Vissershok (which has no more farming as it became a quarry with mining activities) and Clara Anna Fontein.

The region contains the 300-hectare Tygerberg Nature Reserve.

== Facilities ==
The region is not an official census designated place or a suburb of Cape Town, and it does not have residential zoning.

The Parow satellite campus of the German International School Cape Town, in proximity to Tygerberg, serves German-speaking students up to grade 4.

Also in nearby Parow is the Tygerberg Hospital, which serves as the centre for the Medicine and Health Sciences faculty of Stellenbosch University.

== See also ==
- Tygerberg Nature Reserve
