= Marlene Lehnberg =

South African murderer (1955–2015)

- Born: 13 October 1955; South Africa
- Died: 7 October 2015 (aged 59); South Africa
- Status: Deceased
- Conviction: Murder
- Penalty: Death; commuted to 20 years imprisonment
- Accomplice: Marthinus Choegoe

Details
- Victims: Susanna Magdalena van der Linde
- Date: July 1974
- Country: South Africa

Marlene Lehnberg (15 October 1955 – 7 October 2015) was a South African woman who was more commonly known as The Scissor Murderess. She was 18 years old in 1974 when she hired Marthinus Choegoe to stab Susanna Magdalena van der Linde, the wife of Lehnberg's 47-year-old lover Christiaan van der Linde, to death with a pair of scissors. At age 19, she was then the youngest woman to be convicted of murder in South Africa. Both Lehnberg and Marthinus Choegoe were condemned to death. However, both sentences were reduced to prison terms. Lehnberg served 11 years of a 20-year sentence in Pollsmoor Prison outside Cape Town. Choegoe's sentence was reduced to 15 years.

The case set a precedent in South Africa in terms of juveniles and capital punishment; while the Criminal Procedure Act, 1977 permitted the sentencing to death of a person under 18 years, S v. Lehnberg made clear that an abundant presumption, given the presupposition of immaturity, would be in favour of a prison sentence for minors convicted of capital crimes.

== Background ==
In February 1972, Lehnberg began her first job as a clerical assistant/receptionist at the Red Cross Children's Hospital in Rondebosch, Cape Town. She started work in the orthopaedic workshop alongside Christiaan van der Linde. Van der Linde was the workshop's chief technician and Lehnberg, a bright, intelligent and attractive 16-year-old, was apparently drawn to him from the start.

Lehnberg's upbringing had been both ultra-conservative and strict. Her father was puritanical, a man who rarely displayed any affection towards his daughters. She had not been allowed to socialise and had never been to the cinema during the time she was in high school, she was a very intelligent young girl academically and often came first in her class but had no experience of boys or men, she was very naive and innocent and tried hard to get attention via her studies. She was drawn to van der Linde, a person whom she saw as a being warm and friendly father figure. She later recalled "he said "welcome" and my heart beat faster."

Van der Linde and Lehnberg struck up a father-daughter type relationship which grew closer as the months passed. In April 1973, a year after they first met, the couple began an affair.

== The affair ==
Throughout the remainder of 1973, Lehnberg and Van der Linde continued to meet in secret at Rondebosch Common and Paarden Eiland. Then, early in 1974, their intimacy stopped. Van der Linde suspected that they were being watched because his wife was receiving anonymous telephone calls.

Despite the fact that Van der Linde had declared that he would never leave his wife and family, Lehnberg was convinced that the only obstacle to them having a more permanent relationship was the presence of Van der Linde's wife Susanna.

By July 1974, Lehnberg was becoming desperate and started talking about leaving Cape Town. Christiaan van der Linde persuaded her not to, but by September she had finally tired of the situation and decided to confront Susanna. Lehnberg called and explained that she and Christiaan were very much in love and were seeing each other every night. She wanted to know what Susanna van der Linde intended doing, but Susanna van der Linde hung up on her. A few weeks later, Lehnberg telephoned again. This time she made an appointment to go and see her. They met in Bellville early in October.

Initially, Lehnberg had hoped that she and Susanna van der Linde could come to some sort of arrangement concerning Christiaan, but this meeting was to change all of those ideas. Not only did Susanna van der Linde tell Lehnberg that she would never give her husband a divorce because of the children, she also added, she didn't mind playing second fiddle as long as Lehnberg didn't mind either. It was obvious to Lehnberg that Susanna van der Linde was prepared to do anything to keep her husband.

== Run-up to the murder ==
It was around this time that Lehnberg met Marthinus Charles Choegoe, who had lost a leg in a motorcar accident. He had come to the Orthopaedic Workshop to have an artificial limb fitted. He was unemployed and his disabilities, both physical and social, had destroyed his self-esteem. This may have made him particularly susceptible to Lehnberg's approaches.

Lehnberg first contacted Choegoe by letter, which she wrote to him care of Solly's Trading Store, his local shop. In the letter she asked him to come and see her at the Orthopaedic Workshop, adding that if he was clever he could still earn good money. When he arrived at the workshop Lehnberg gave him R1.00 and asked him to meet her at the Rondebosch town hall at 7 p.m. that evening, at which time she gave him a bottle of gin and said that she wanted him to murder a woman for her. Choegoe declined at first, saying that he was afraid of being sent to the gallows.

After some discussion Choegoe finally agreed to Lehnberg's request. Several days later he went to the address in Boston, Bellville which Lehnberg had given him, later claiming that he planned to warn Susanna van der Linde that her life was in danger. But instead of warning Susanna van der Linde of Lehnberg's plans, he simply asked her for some money. She said she didn't have any and went back inside the house.

A week later Choegoe and Lehnberg met in Rondebosch once more. This time he admitted that he was too afraid to go through with the murder. Lehnberg gave him a radio and promised that she would help him to receive an artificial limb if he did away with Susanna van der Linde. Choegoe went to Bellville again but on this occasion he simply walked past the house and made no attempt to enter.

Shortly afterward Lehnberg sent Choegoe a second letter, again urging him to go through with the murder, using a knife if he had to. She got another message to him, asking him to telephone her at work. During the subsequent conversation Lehnberg insisted that Choegoe go through with the murder. She promised to give him a car and have sex with him after the crime had been committed.

== Murder ==
In October 1974 Lehnberg handed in her notice at the hospital and told van der Linde that she was going to leave Cape Town. On 24 October Lehnberg collected Choegoe from his home in Retreat and drove him to Bellville in her car. He was armed with a hammer which was to be used to kill Susanna van der Linde. Lehnberg dropped him off in the vicinity of Boston and sped away. Shortly afterward Choegoe was spotted by Susanna van der Linde. She was alarmed because she had seen him in the area on more than one occasion. She telephoned the Bellville Police Station and Choegoe was picked up by the police about two blocks from her house. At the police station he was beaten and warned not to return to the area.

In the face of repeated failure Lehnberg decided to take matters into her own hands again. A few days after Choegoe's failed attempt, she approached Rob Newman, a 24-year old engineering student whom she knew, and asked to borrow his Llama pistol. When he refused she asked if he would kill someone for her. Again he refused but on 28 October Newman's pistol was stolen from his room. He reported the theft to the police and suggested Lehnberg as a likely suspect.

Around 8.30 a.m. on the morning of Monday 4 November 1974 Lehnberg arrived at Choegoe's home. She said that her car was packed and she was on her way to Johannesburg, but before she left she needed Choegoe to come with her to van der Linde's house. He claimed in a statement that it wasn't until she handed him the Llama pistol on the way to Bellville that he realized that she wasn't just going to say goodbye.

They arrived outside the house just after 9 a.m. Susanna van der Linde was alone inside. From this point on Choegoe's and Lehnberg's account of what followed differ.

=== Different accounts ===
Lehnberg claimed that she got out of the car, rang the doorbell and returned to the car while Choegoe entered the house alone and committed the murder. Choegoe, however, maintained that they acted together throughout. Choegoe's account was supported by a neighbour of the van der Linde's, Mrs. Marais. On the morning in question, Marais had walked past Lehnberg's white Ford Anglia twice in the space of ten or twelve minutes while it was parked opposite the van der Linde house and on both occasions the car was empty.

Choegoe said that after Lehnberg rang the bell they went into the house together. When Susanna van der Linde saw them both she became frightened and threatened to phone the police. She attempted to get away, but was tripped by Lehnberg, fell and hit her head on the door. While Susanna van der Linde was on the floor Lehnberg struck her on the jaw with the butt of the pistol. On Lehnberg's instructions Choegoe began to throttle the semi-conscious Susanna van der Linde. Lehnberg then gave him a pair of scissors she had taken from the sideboard. Choegoe said he remembered stabbing Susanna van der Linde three times but the pathologist later noted seven stab wounds, six of which had penetrated the chest.

After the murder Lehnberg squirted green dye over Choegoe using a gas pistol Susanna van der Linde had asked her husband to buy after she had seen Choegoe in the van der Linde's neighborhood. (Note: A non-lethal gas or dye pistol uses a carbon dioxide cartridge to propel dye at a target. Police use them during car chases and civil unrest to mark vehicles and participants for later identification.) After warning Choegoe that she would deny any involvement in the murder if he went to the police, Lehnberg took him home. She set off for Johannesburg, collecting two speeding tickets at Beaufort West on the journey.

When the police brought van der Linde home to identify his wife he casually turned the body with his foot and said that it was his wife. This was reported at the time by the police officers present as appearing callous and almost as if he had been expecting it.

It was suggested at the time that van der Linde had influenced Lehnberg in order to get her to murder his wife but this was not proven and he was never charged.

=== Arrest ===
Choegoe kept both of the pistols that were used at the scene of the crime which were later seized by police. When he was asked why he hadn't discarded them he replied that it was dangerous to throw pistols away.

Susanna van der Linde's body was discovered at about 1 p.m. by her daughter. van der Linde attempted to telephone his wife a number of times that morning and eventually became concerned when there was no reply. He spoke to his daughter Zelda, who worked at Tygerberg Hospital, and asked her to go home during her lunch break to see if there was anything wrong. When she arrived home the house was locked up, but through a window she caught a glimpse of her mother lying on the floor in the living room.

The police immediately began an intensive murder investigation. Their chief suspect was "a crippled coloured man" who had been seen in the area on at least two occasions prior to the murder. In fact, it was because of Choegoe that Susanna van der Linde insisted that her husband buy her a dye pistol. At first nobody considered that Lehnberg was involved or that she may have hired an assassin.

For the next week police efforts to establish Choegoe's identity and whereabouts proved fruitless. But at around 7.30 a.m. on 13 November a breakthrough occurred. Lieutenant Roland Fourie of the Brixton Murder and Robbery Squad in Johannesburg went to see Lehnberg, who was staying at her uncle's house in Bryanston and asked her to accompany him to Brixton Police Station where he wished to ask her some questions. Lehnberg admitted on the way to the police station that van der Linde was her lover. She added that she had been expecting the police to contact her ever since she first heard about the murder of Susanna van der Linde from her mother.

When asked if she had an association with "a coloured man named Marthinus" she denied the allegation. Fourie also asked her if she had once requested a Robert Newman to give her his pistol so that she could get rid of Susanna van der Linde. Lehnberg admitted that she had, but that the request had been made in fun. Although Fourie had no specific evidence to tie Lehnberg to the murder it did strike him that she seemed unnaturally nervous at times during the interview.

While Fourie was on the telephone to Cape Town another detective, Major van Aswegen, began asking Lehnberg questions. She suddenly blurted out that she took Choegoe to the van der Linde house, waited for him outside and took him home afterwards.

Lehnberg was arrested and formally charged with the murder of Susanna van der Linde. Later that day she made a full statement in which she admitted that she had asked Choegoe, if he would do away with Susanna van der Linde. In the statement she claimed that she had waited in the car while her accomplice had committed the crime. Choegoe was arrested the same day.

The trial of Lehnberg and Choegoe began at the Cape Town Supreme Court on 5 March 1975. The trial drew hundreds of spectators who fought for seats in the packed courtroom. After a hearing which lasted seven days, during which the State called more than 30 witnesses, the Judge, Justice Diemont and his two assessors, A.J. van Niekerk and F. van Zyl Smit QC, deliberated overnight and returned verdicts of guilty for both accused. The court found no extenuating circumstances and Lehnberg and Choegoe were sentenced to death.

== Appeal and imprisonment ==
Two months later, the case was re-opened on appeal. In July 1975, the death sentences were set aside. Lehnberg was sentenced to 20 years imprisonment and Choegoe to 15 years. Choegoe, however, was released in June 1986 and became an evangelical preacher, while Lehnberg was paroled in December of the same year.

Lehnberg ended her life in October 2015, five days before her 60th birthday. She had suffered from osteoporosis for years and had also been diagnosed with breast cancer. She could no longer take the severe pain she was in and committed suicide alone at home, and in relative obscurity. Choegoe died in a car accident in 1992 on the N7 near Nuwerus in the Western Cape.

The third member of the tragic triangle, Christiaan van der Linde, died a lonely man in 1983. After the trial, he moved to Krugersdorp so that he could visit his wife's grave on her family's farm in the Magaliesberg mountains every day. He expressed remorse of ever having met Marlene Lehnberg.

== Aftermath ==
After the trial a law known as the "Marlene Lehnberg Clause" was passed in South Africa, preventing convicted criminals from profiting from their crimes, since it was believed that Lehnberg planned to sell her story to the press for a large sum of money.
