= The Settlers High School =

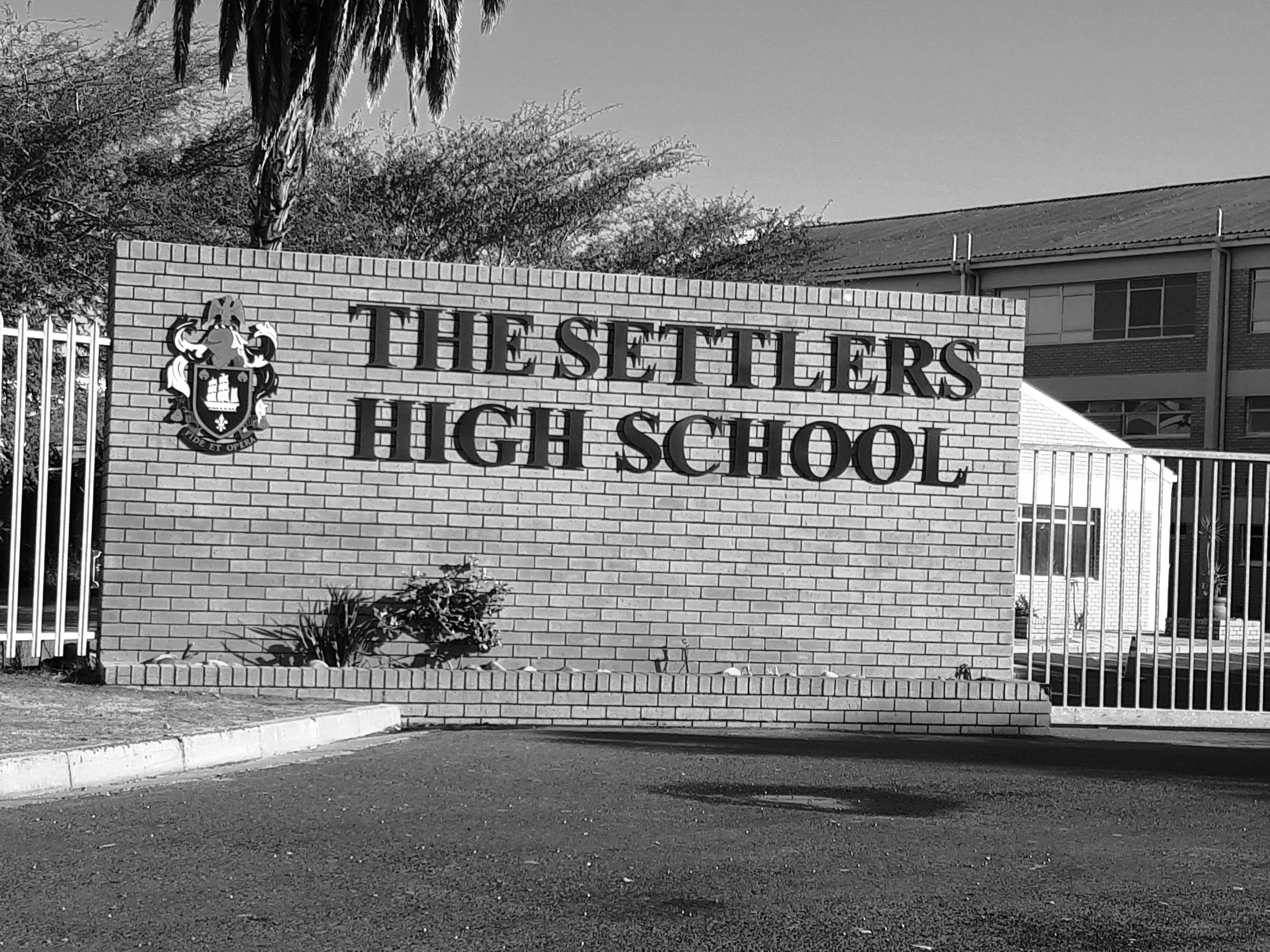
- The Settlers High School 2018

Location
- Settlers Street; Bellville, Western Cape; South Africa; 33°53′49″S 18°36′28″E

Information
- School type: Public
- Motto: Fide et Opera (By Faith and Work)
- Religious affiliation: Secular multi-faith
- Established: 1965; 61 years ago
- School district: District 4
- Principal: L Hall
- Grades: 8-12
- Gender: Co-ed
- Age: 13 to 18
- Enrollment: 1,285
- Language: English
- Campus: Urban
- Colors: Navy & white
- Nickname: settlers
- Rival: Hoërskool Durbanville; Fairmont High
- Accreditation: Western Cape Education Department
- Website: www.settlers.org.za

The Settlers High School is a public English medium co-educational high school situated in Bellville which is in the Western Cape province of South Africa. The high school was established in 1965.

== History ==
The School was started on 19 January 1965. ET Hobbs was the Headmaster. The School recognise the British heritage in its naming of its houses: Pringle, Bain and Shaw. These three were 1820 Settlers from Britain to South Africa.

== Awards ==
Settlers received the Provincial Excellence in English Home Language Award, from The Premier Helen Zille and Education Minister Donald Grant. This is awarded for the school with the highest number of passes in English Home Language.

== Events ==
The school buildings were officially opened on 24 April 1969. On 23 October 1990, the parents of the school voted for the school to be opened to all races.

== Alumni ==
- Annette Cowley - Retired South African Swimmer.
- Levi Alexander (2005-2009), choral conductor and music educator.
- Neil de Kock, Scrumhalf for the Springboks rugby team in 2001.
