= Welgemoed, Bellville =

Welgemoed
- Suburb
- Location within Western Cape Location within South Africa Location within Africa
- Coordinates: 33°52′25″S 18°37′4.1″E
- Country: South Africa
- Province: Western Cape
- Municipality: City of Cape Town
- Main Place: Bellville

Area
  - Total: 2.5 km^{2} (0.97 sq mi)

Population (2011)
  - Total: 3,274
  - Density: 1,300/km^{2} (3,400/sq mi)

Racial makeup (2011)
  - Black African: 3.4%
  - Coloured: 7.0%
  - Indian/Asian: 1.3%
  - White: 86.1%
  - Other: 2.2%

First languages (2011)
  - Afrikaans: 70.0%
  - English: 25.1%
  - Other: 4.9%
- Time zone: UTC+2 (SAST)
- Postal code (street): 7530
- PO box: 7538
- Area code: 021

Welgemoed is an upmarket residential suburb of Bellville in the Western Cape, South Africa. It is situated approximately 4 kilometres (2.5 mi) north-west of the Bellville CBD and 22 kilometres (13.7 mi) north-east of Cape Town. In terms of the City of Cape Town planning districts, Welgemoed is classified as part of the Northern Suburbs.

== Geography ==
Welgemoed lies in the northern reaches of Bellville on the slopes of the Tygerberg Hill at an altitude of 310 m (1017 ft), making it the highest suburb of the city. As a result of its location, the suburb offers views overlooking Bellville and the Greater Cape Town metropolitan area.

Welgemoed can be also be used as a collective for its neighbouring suburbs stretching from Loevenstein to Kanonberg and includes the suburbs of Welgemoed Greens, De Bron, Protea Valley, Door de Kraal, Van Riebeeckshof, Oude Westhof, Welgedacht, Hoheizen, Blomvlei and Selborne.

== Education ==
Welgemoed has a primary school called Welgemoed Primary School, situated alongside Jip de Jäger Avenue and between the Bellville Golf Club and Welgemoed Forum.

== Retail ==
Welgemoed is served by the Welgemoed Forum Shopping Centre, which is anchored by Woolworths Food, Clicks and an Engen service station and Welgemoed Plaza, which is anchored by PicknPay. However, due to the small size of the two shopping centres the variety of goods sold is limited, and for larger shopping trips, residents need to make the short journey to the nearby shopping centres of Tygervalley and Willowbridge, both within an 8-minute drive.

== Recreation ==
=== Bellville Golf Club ===
Established in 1957, the Bellville Golf Club, an 18-hole golf course forms an integral part of Welgemoed, with the suburb surrounding the golf course. It stretches in an east–west direction across the suburb and is located on both sides of Jip de Jäger Avenue.

=== Tygerberg Nature Reserve ===
The Tygerberg Nature Reserve is set just above Welgemoed on the Tygerberg Hills to the west, with the entrance on Totius Street. The nature reserve offers sweeping views across the Greater Cape Town metropolitan area.

== Transport ==
=== Roads ===
Jip de Jäger Avenue (M16) is the suburb's main road, connecting to the N1 highway and Bellville West in the south and Durbanville in the north-east. In the broader area of Welgemoed, Van Riebeeckshof Road connects the suburbs of Van Riebeeckshof, Protea Valley, Door de Kraal, Oude Westhof, Kanonberg and Welgedacht, which lie north of Welgemoed with Kenridge to the east.
