= Jack Muller Danie Uys Park =

Park in Bellville, South Africa

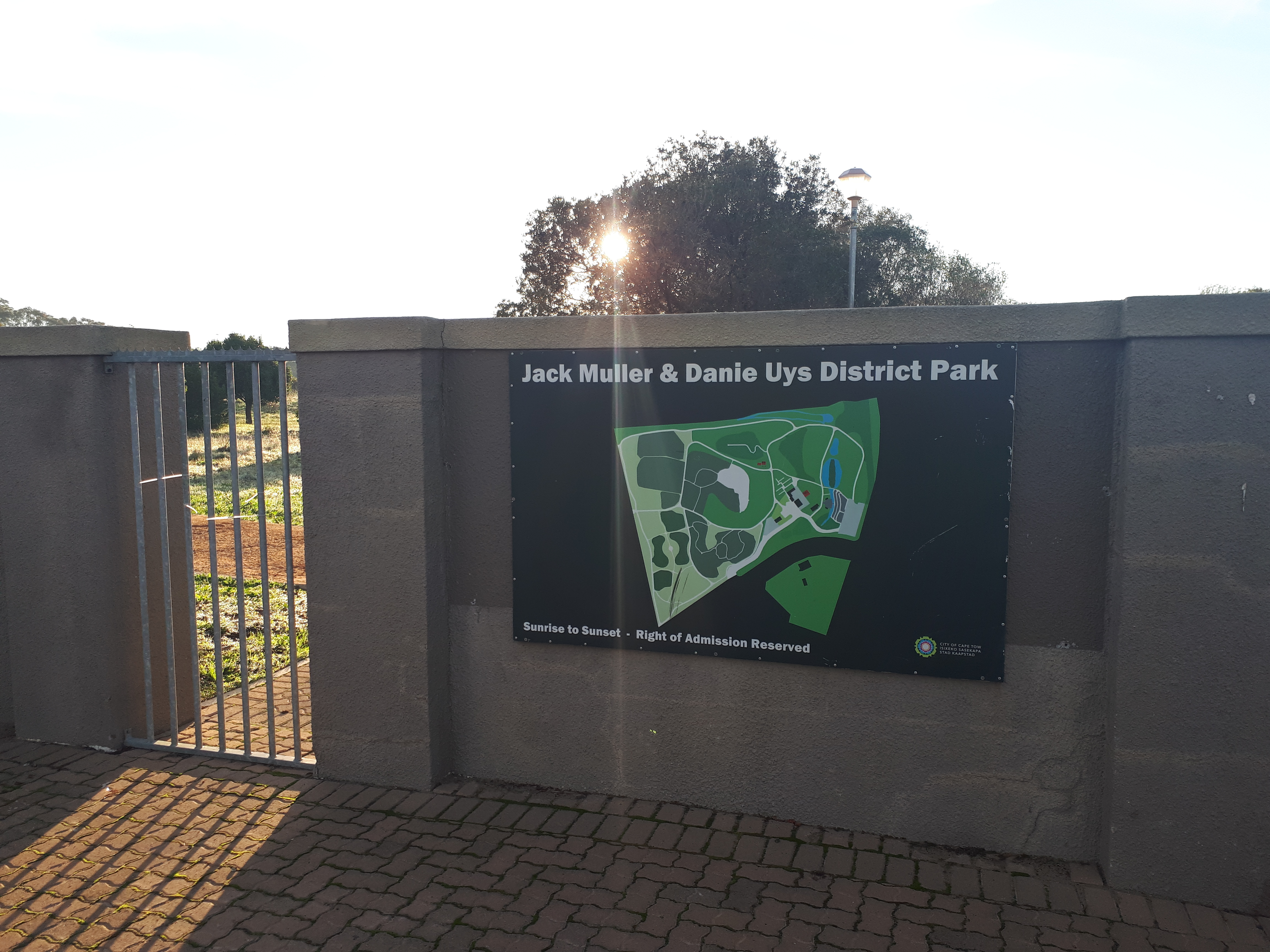
- Jack Muller Danie Uys Park side entrance
- Interactive map of Jack Muller Danie Uys Park
- Type: Urban Park
- Location: Bellville, Western Cape, South Africa
- Coordinates: =33.889896°S 18.627293°E
- Area: Boston
- Operator: City of Cape Town
- Website: http://www.capetown.gov.za/Family%20and%20home/see-all-city-facilities/our-recreational-facilities/District%20parks/Jack%20Muller%20Park

The Jack Muller Danie Uys Park is a municipal park situated in Boston, Bellville, Western Cape, South Africa.

== Name ==
It's named after Daniel Uys (b.3 June 1932), Mayor of Bellville, South Africa from 1975 to 1977 and from 1983 to 1985 and Jack Muller a Councillor of Bellville Municipality

== History ==
Formerly, the area was two adjacent, but separate parks. The municipality have set aside the park for its residents. Prof Kristo Pienaar a botanist and previous a mayor of Bellville selected the trees and plants for the park.

== Management ==
The Park is managed by the Greater City of Cape Town, namely the City Parks Division and community based organization: "Friends of the Jack Muller Park", Greater Tygerberg Partnership and Boston Spirits.

== Activities ==
It has an outdoor auditorium and indigenous plants and trees. The bird the Cape Weaver (Ploceus Capansis) breeds in the park. It is a free entrance park.

It is open from sunrise to sunset.

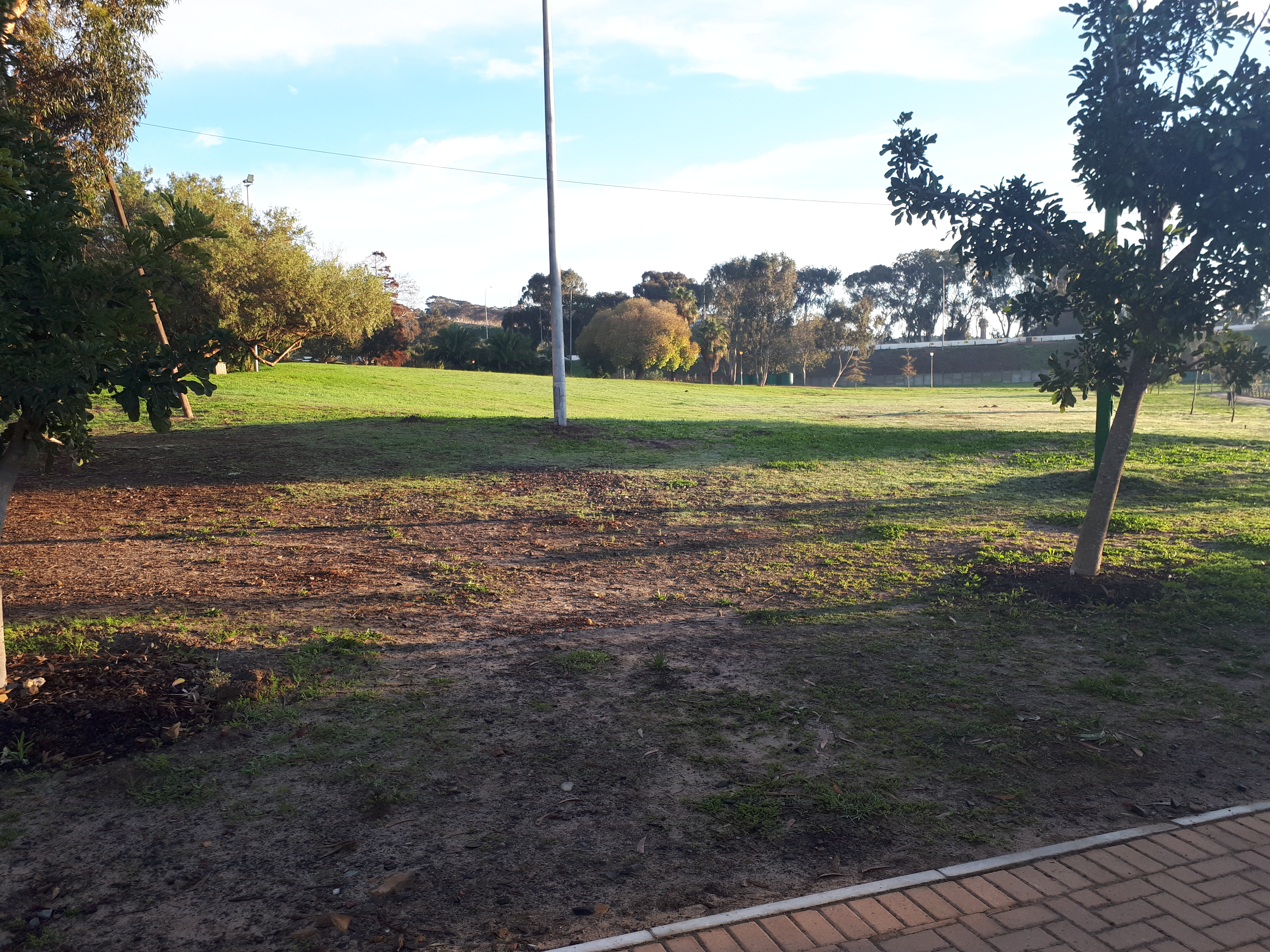
Inside the Park

The Bellville Parkrun is held here.

Pets are allowed.

== Clubs ==
Bellville Underwater Diving Club.

Bellville Running Club
