= Vital Health Foods =

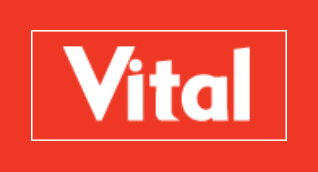
- Founded: 1947; 79 years ago in Wellington, South Africa
- Founder: Jack Grieve
- Headquarters: Bellville, City of Cape Town Metropolitan Municipality, South Africa
- Website: vital.co.za

Vital Health Foods is the largest vitamin and nutritional supplement company in Africa, with its head office in Bellville, near Cape Town, South Africa. The manufacturer adheres to medicinal Good Manufacturing Processes. It is audited by the Medicines Control Council in South Africa and by Therapeutic Goods Administration internationally.

== History ==
Vital Health Foods was the first health foods company in South Africa, founded in 1947 by Mr. Jack Grieve in the small town of Wellington, South Africa. The company has grown to be the leading supplement manufacturer in Africa, exporting internationally. The company formulates, tests, and manufactures its own products, and provides a customer helpline run by qualified dieticians.
