= Boston, Bellville =

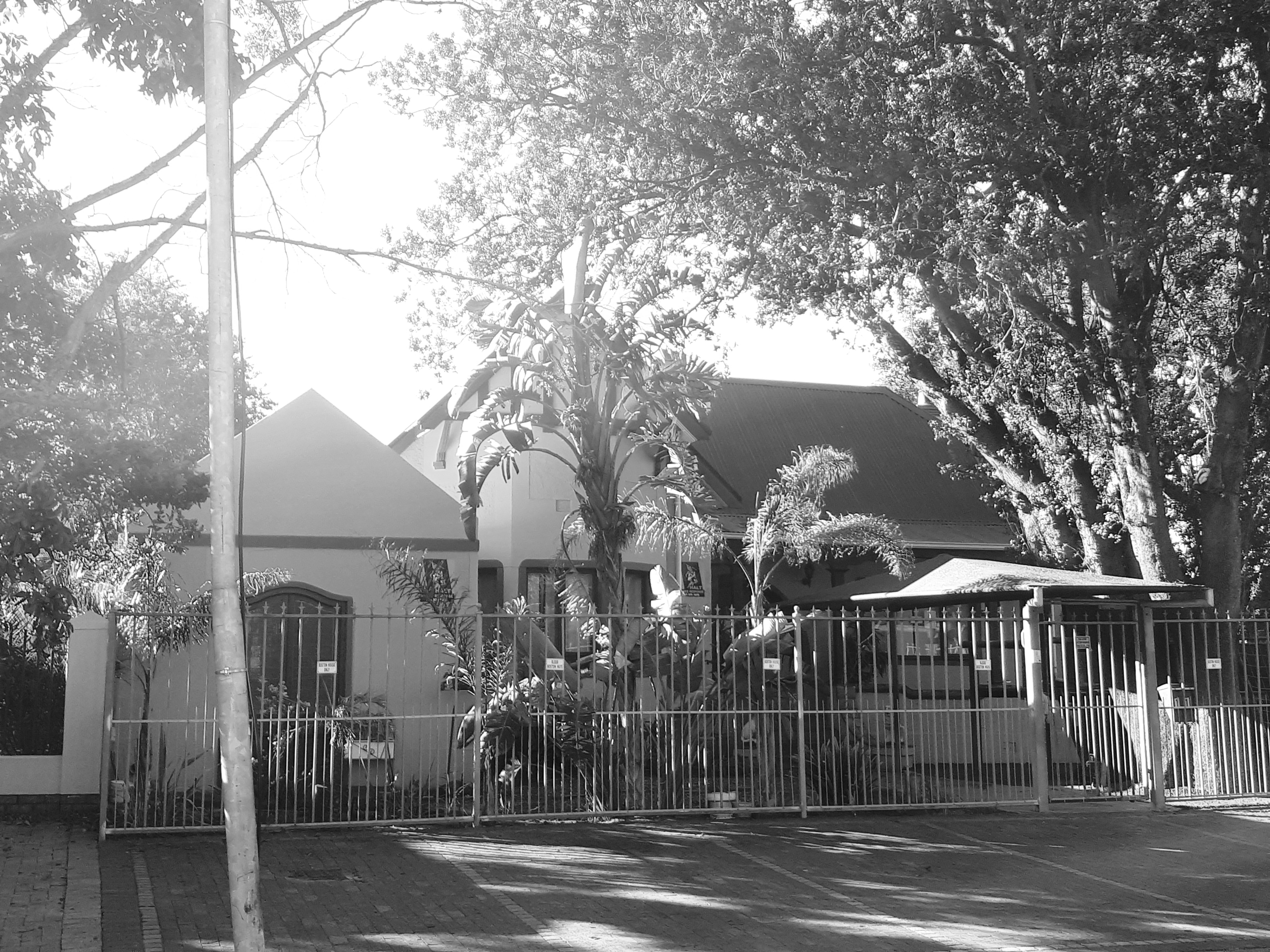
- The oldest house in Boston in 1st avenue

- Location within Western Cape Location within South Africa
- Coordinates: 33°53′42″S 18°37′24″E
- Country: South Africa
- Province: Western Cape
- Municipality: City of Cape Town
- Established: 1900
- Time zone: UTC+2 (SAST)
- Postal code (street): 7530
- Area code: 021

Boston, or Boston Estate, is a suburb in Bellville, City of Cape Town, South Africa, and is one of Bellville's oldest residential suburbs.

== History ==
In 1900, a company from the United States of America bought a piece of land known as “the Willows” from a Mr Duminy. This land used to be part of Loevenstein.The new owners decided to subdivide the land into stands and which spurred residential development in the area. The popular building style was Victorian. Bay windows, wooden floors, lead glass windows, pressed steel ceilings and wooden frame windows were common features of individual homes.

== Etymology ==
Boston is named after the eponymous city of Boston, Massachusetts. Most street names in Boston reflect the suburb's US connections, e.g. Broadway, Washington, Gladstone, Lincoln, Salisbury and Cleveland.

== Education ==
DF Akademie, Totius Primary, Boston Primary, (first English medium school in the Northern Suburbs ) and Vredelust Primary are schools located within the area.

== Murder ==
Boston was the location of the infamous “Scissors Murderess”, Marlene Lehnberg and her accomplice Marthinus Charles Choegoe, who murdered Susanna Magdalena van der Linde on 4 November 1974 with a pair of scissors in Gladstone Street, Boston. Lehnberg had an affair with van der Linde's husband, Christiaan. This drew South Africa and the world's attention to the suburb. Judge Justice Diemont found both guilty on 12 March 1975 and after appealing the death sentence Lehnberg and Choegoe were sentenced to jail for 20 and 15 years respectively.

== Notable residents ==
Annette Cowley, retired South African Swimmer

Rashied Staggie, former leader of the Hard Livings gang. In 2004 he was convicted of stealing weapons from the Faure police station. He was sentenced to 13 years in jail. He stayed in a highly secured property in Boston. Rival gangs tried to kill him there a number of times. Crime is below average in this suburb.

Francois Van Coke, stage name for Francois Badenhorst is a rock singer. Associated acts include Fokofpolisiekar and Van Coke Kartel. He also acts as a solo artist. He and his wife are local residents.

Crystal-Donna Roberts, South African actress and SAFTA winner for her role in Krotoa (2017). She was also the first South African actress to walk the red carpet at the 72nd Venice Film Festival in light of her role in The Endless River (2015). She and her husband are local residents in Boston.

Donovan Wright, South African Marathon runner and Comrades marathon Gold medallist, came from an underprivileged past to end up in Boston.

June van Merch, South African actress, currently resides in Boston.

Albert Maritz, actor, grew up in Boston.

== Park ==
The Jack Muller Danie Uys Park in the suburb is used to accommodate a Parkrun.
