= Stellenbosch Business School =

Business school in Bellville, Western Cape, South Africa

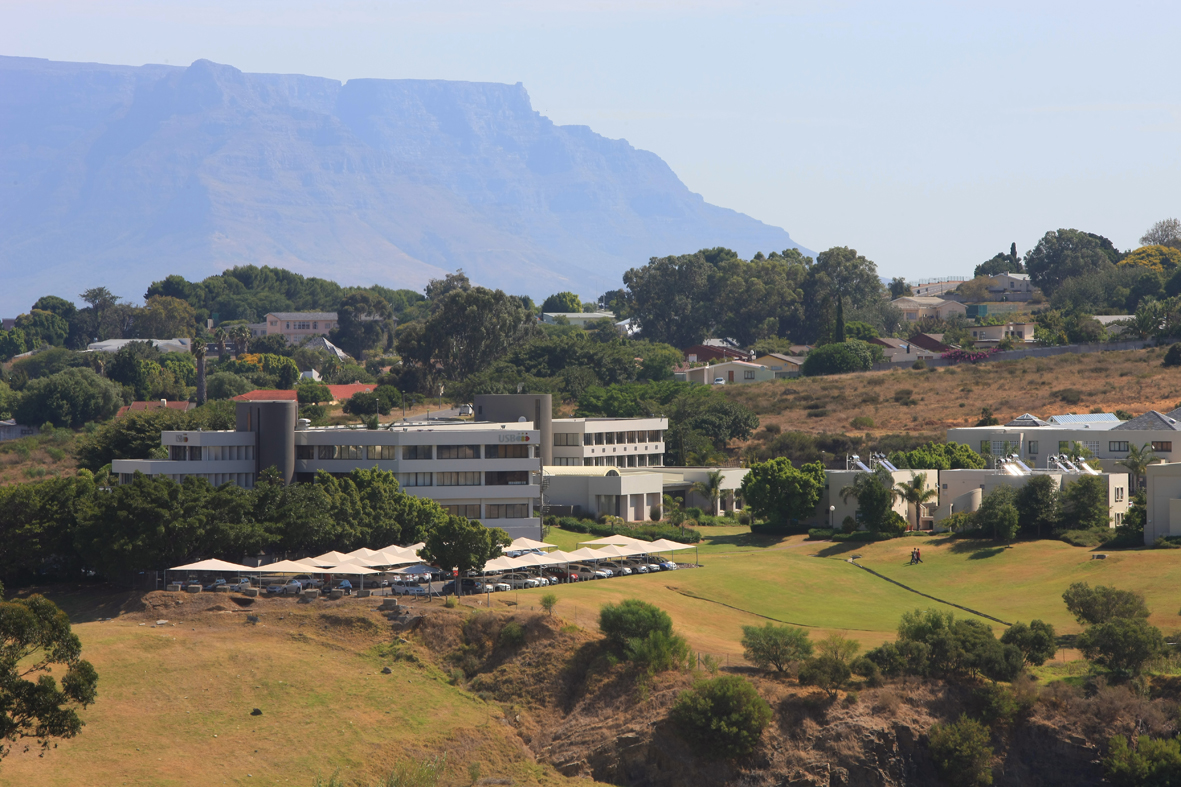
- Stellenbosch Business School campus
- Type: Business school
- Established: 1964; 62 years ago
- Director: Chris van der Hoven
- Faculty: 123 (2025)
- Students: 1,100 (2025)
- Location: Bellville, City of Cape Town, Western Cape, South Africa; 33°53′4.55″S 18°37′37.11″E
- Campus: Urban
- Website: stellenboschbusiness.ac.za

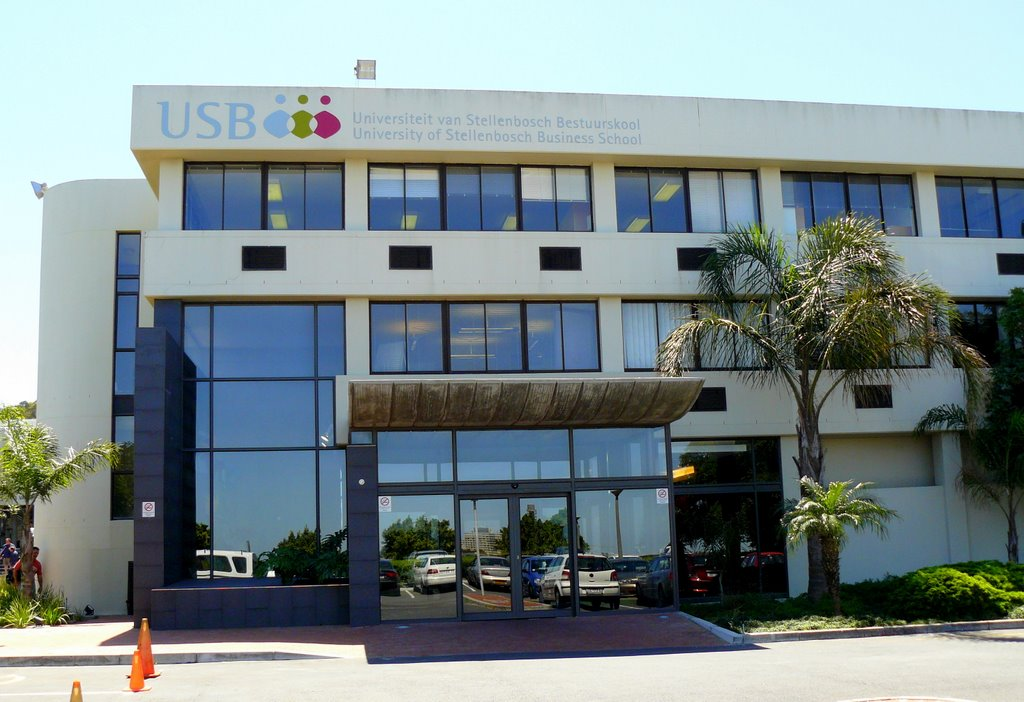
Stellenbosch Business School's main building entrance

Stellenbosch Business School is the business school of the University of Stellenbosch. Its campus is situated in Bellville, in the Western Cape province of South Africa.

== History ==
The University of Stellenbosch Business School was founded in 1964, enrolling 14 MBA students. Four years later the first DBA degree was conferred.

In 1981, the current premises in Bellville, a suburb of the City of Cape Town, was acquired. Five years later, the department relocated from Stellenbosch to the Bellville Park Campus.

Through the years, more programmes have been added, such as an MPhil in Development Finance in 2003. Programmes in Management Coaching, Futures Studies, Leadership and Project Management followed.

Stellenbosch University's business school was the first school from an African university to receive Triple Accreditation – EQUIS (first accredited in 2001), AMBA (first accredited in 2002), and AACSB (first accredited in 2012).

== Location ==
The hilltop campus of the business school is situated in Bellville, about halfway between Cape Town CBD and the town of Stellenbosch, where the main campus of Stellenbosch University is located.

== Publications and journals ==
The business school manages two journals:

- South African Journal of Business Management
- Journal for Studies in Economics and Econometrics (in collaboration with the Bureau for Economic Research, and the Department of Economics, Stellenbosch University)

The business school also publishes the online magazine Stellenbosch Management Review. The publication contains narrative articles extracted from the school's research.

== Postgraduate programmes ==
The Stellenbosch Business School offers a number of postgraduate programs:

- MBA – Master of Business Administration
- PhD
- PGDip in Business Administration
- PGDip, MPhil in Development Finance
- PGDip, MPhil in Futures Studies (IFR)
- MPhil in Management Coaching
- PGDip in Leadership Development
- PGDip in Project Management
- PGDip in Financial Planning
- Short Courses (SBS-ED)

== Research centres ==
The business school hosts six research centres, focusing on Development Finance, Corporate Governance in Africa, Responsible Leadership, Conflict and Collaboration, Futures Research and Women at Work.

== Small Business Academy ==
Founded in 2012, the Small Business Academy is one of the ways in which the business school reinvests in society. The SBA offers a nine-month programme to small-business owners from low-income communities in South Africa to help them grow their businesses. A key feature of the programme is the mentorship provided by alumni of the school. The SBA also undertakes research on small-business development.

== Sustainability and social involvement ==
Stellenbosch University's Business School endorses the importance of responsible business and management education. The school is a member of various global organisations focused on the role of business in society, and responsible management education and research. The school, through its Social Impact Division and other platforms, is involved in various projects aimed at thought leadership, capacity building and practical engagement in this field.
