= Pollsmoor Prison =

Facility in Cape Town, South Africa

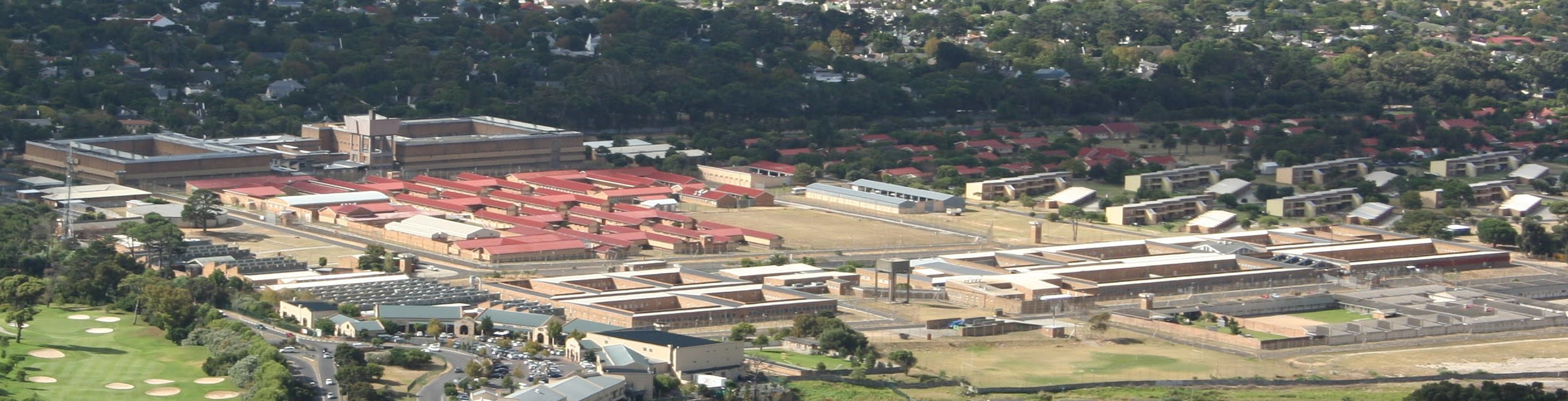
- An aerial view of Pollsmoor Prison from Table Mountain.
- Interactive map of Pollsmoor Prison
- Location: Steenberg Rd Tokai, Cape Town
- Security class: maximum
- Capacity: 4,336
- Population: 7,000+
- Opened: 1964
- Managed by: Department of Correctional Services

Pollsmoor Prison, officially known as Pollsmoor Maximum Security Prison, is located in the Cape Town suburb of Tokai in South Africa. Pollsmoor is a maximum security penal facility that continues to hold some of South Africa's most dangerous criminals. Although the prison was designed with a maximum capacity of 4,336 offenders attended by a staff of 1,278, the current inmate population is over 7,000 (a figure which fluctuates daily).

== Structure of the prison ==
Since it was established in 1964, the prison has been systematically expanded, so that Pollsmoor today comprises five prisons:

- The Admission Centre serves a number of the courts in the Cape Peninsula (Cape Town, Mitchell's Plain, Somerset West and Wynberg).
- Medium A Prison houses both awaiting trial and sentenced juveniles between the ages of 14 and 17.
- Medium B Prison houses sentenced adult males.
- Medium C Prison houses sentenced adult males with sentences of up to a year, sentenced adult males on day-parole or soon-to-be-released males.
- The Female Prison houses juvenile (under 18) and adult women, both awaiting-trial and sentenced. There are also a number of infants under the age of 2 living in the Female Prison.

The prison also hosts a number of facilities to assist in the training of prisoners so as to reduce recidivism upon release such as a restaurant that is open to the public.

=== Admission centre ===
The Pollsmoor Admission Centre (formerly the Maximum Prison) is the largest of the five prisons making up the Pollsmoor Management Area. The vast majority of its approximately 3,200 inmates (almost half the total inmate population of Pollsmoor) are unsentenced awaiting-trial prisoners, or sentenced prisoners facing further charges. As an awaiting-trial prison (or remand centre) its population is constantly changing. On a daily basis, about 300 prisoners are booked out to appear in various courts around Cape Town. Some return as sentenced prisoners, others do not return at all, but large numbers come back to their cells to await a future court date, sometimes as distant as six months later.

The Pollsmoor Admission Centre receives prisoners sent to it by the courts. It is massively overcrowded, holding more than twice as many prisoners as it was designed for. By far the majority of prisoners live in communal bungalow cells, in which up to 40 prisoners sleep on double and triple bunks. Even the tiny single cells (of 2.5 by 2 metres) are occupied by one or three prisoners.

=== Gangsterism inside Pollsmoor ===
Gangsterism is a potent feature of Pollsmoor Prison life, and gangs are segregated into three separate sections on a single floor, accommodating a total of between 500 and 750. This segregation is in part an attempt to limit the gangs' ongoing recruitment of new members from amongst the recent arrivals. Because wardens are present in the sections for less than two-thirds of the day, the gangs are enormously powerful in the communal cells. Gang rule involves extreme violence, including sexual violence.

The prison's gangs, the 26s, 27s, and 28s, are collectively referred to as "The Numbers". The groups are loosely affiliated with one another, each having its own hierarchy, leadership, and function within the whole. The 26s secure money via gambling and smuggling. The 27s serve as gang enforcers. The 28s are the soldiers for all three groups, and deal with procuring and keeping sexual partners or "wyfies".

Few members achieve the means to leave these gangs after leaving prison. They tattoo their ranks on their bodies or faces, so that even outside prison their status is clear. Some members are so tied into the gang culture that life outside is unthinkable, and they would rather confess to a crime they didn't commit than be free men walking the streets.

The majority of prisoners are from oppressed communities where there is large-scale unemployment, a lack of educational and other facilities, homelessness and gangsterism. As a predominantly awaiting-trial institution, there are few resources at Pollsmoor for prisoner programmes, other than visits by independent religious caregivers and non-governmental organisations. Inmates spend nearly all day in their overcrowded cells, and spend only one hour a day having outdoor exercise in enclosed courtyards. Little exercise occurs during this hour, since gang leaders utilise this time to communicate with prisoners in other cells, exchange drugs, mete out punishment to those in other cells etc. Any inmate who dares to exercise is called to "attention" before a gang leader, and may face punishment. Drugs are commonly smuggled into cells, mainly from returning prisoners and corrupt prison wardens.

=== The Prisons Transformation Project ===
The Prisons Transformation Project is run by the University of Cape Town Centre for Conflict Resolution was inspired by the above-mentioned BBC documentary, and attempts to raise self-awareness among prisoners in an attempt at rehabilitation. This includes humane treatment that restores dignity, educating them on alternatives to violence in resolving conflict and giving them birds and feral cats to care for.

== Notable inmates ==
=== Current inmates ===
- Zwelethu Mthethwa is a South African artist convicted of murder in 2017.

=== Former inmates ===
- Marlene Lehnberg, known as The Scissor Murderess, served her sentence in Pollsmoor but was paroled in 1986.
- Walter Sisulu, political prisoner, senior ANC member and anti-apartheid activist.
- Nelson Mandela, political prisoner, first president of a democratic South Africa, anti-apartheid activist, and ANC member was held in Pollsmoor prior to his release from prison by the apartheid government.
- Ahmed Kathrada, political prisoner, senior ANC member and anti-apartheid activist
- Raymond Mhlaba, political prisoner, senior ANC member and anti-apartheid activist
- Andrew Mlangeni, political prisoner, senior ANC member and anti-apartheid activist
- Jafta Masemola, political prisoner, co-founder and senior PAC member and anti-apartheid activist
- Elias Motsoaledi, political prisoner, senior ANC member and anti-apartheid activist
- Wilton Mkwayi, political prisoner, senior ANC member and anti-apartheid activist
- Oscar Mpetha, political prisoner, senior ANC member, unionist and anti-apartheid activist
- Allan Boesak served his prison term here after he was convicted of fraud in 2000.

== Pollsmoor in the media ==
=== BBC documentary ===
In 2001 Pollsmoor prison was the subject of Clifford Bestall's BBC documentary, where they focussed on two soon-to-be-released prisoners, Erefan Jacobs and Mogamat Benjamin (then leader of the "28" gang), and followed their adapting into civilian life again after their release.

=== Mikhael Subotzky photographs inside Pollsmoor ===
On 27 April 2005 (Freedom Day in South Africa) photographer Mikhael Subotzky exhibited his panoramic photographs of the inside of the prison at Pollsmoor. It was titled "'Die Vier Hoeke'" (The Four Corners) where the exhibition space echoed that which was being exhibited. Subotzky also commented on the meaning of this as well, where the viewers were part of the bureaucracy of getting into and eventually being locked into the maximum security prison.

This trend (of having art events inside prisons) was continued in November 2005 when a play was staged at another South African prison. When Herman Charles Bosman's Cold Stone Jug was staged at Zonderwater Prison in Cullinan, outside Pretoria, it was hailed as a world first. Never before had an audience gone to view a play, put on and acted in by prisoners, in a maximum security prison.

=== Ross Kemp ===
In the series Ross Kemp on Gangs, Pollsmoor Prison was featured.

=== Long Walk to Freedom ===
In the film Long Walk to Freedom Nelson Mandela is transferred from Robben Island to Pollsmoor Prison after serving 18 years on the island.
