= Institute for Futures Research =

South African research institute

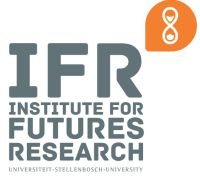
- Established: 1974
- Director: Doris Viljoen
- Faculty: 7
- Location: Bellville, WP, ZA; 33°53′4.55″S 18°37′37.11″E
- Campus: Urban
- Website: www.ifr.sun.ac.za

The Institute for Futures Research (IFR), established in 1974, is a research institution of the University of Stellenbosch specialising in futurology, primarily as a support service for knowledge and strategic management. The IFR's research focus is on the following fields of specialisation:

- Business futuristics and the systems approach to transformation management
- Long-term economic structure studies
- Applied demographics
- Technology foresight
- Socio-political studies
- Energy futures
