= Bellville historical clay and stone quarry and adjacent jail =

Bellville’s Historical Clay and Stone Quarry and the Adjacent Jail
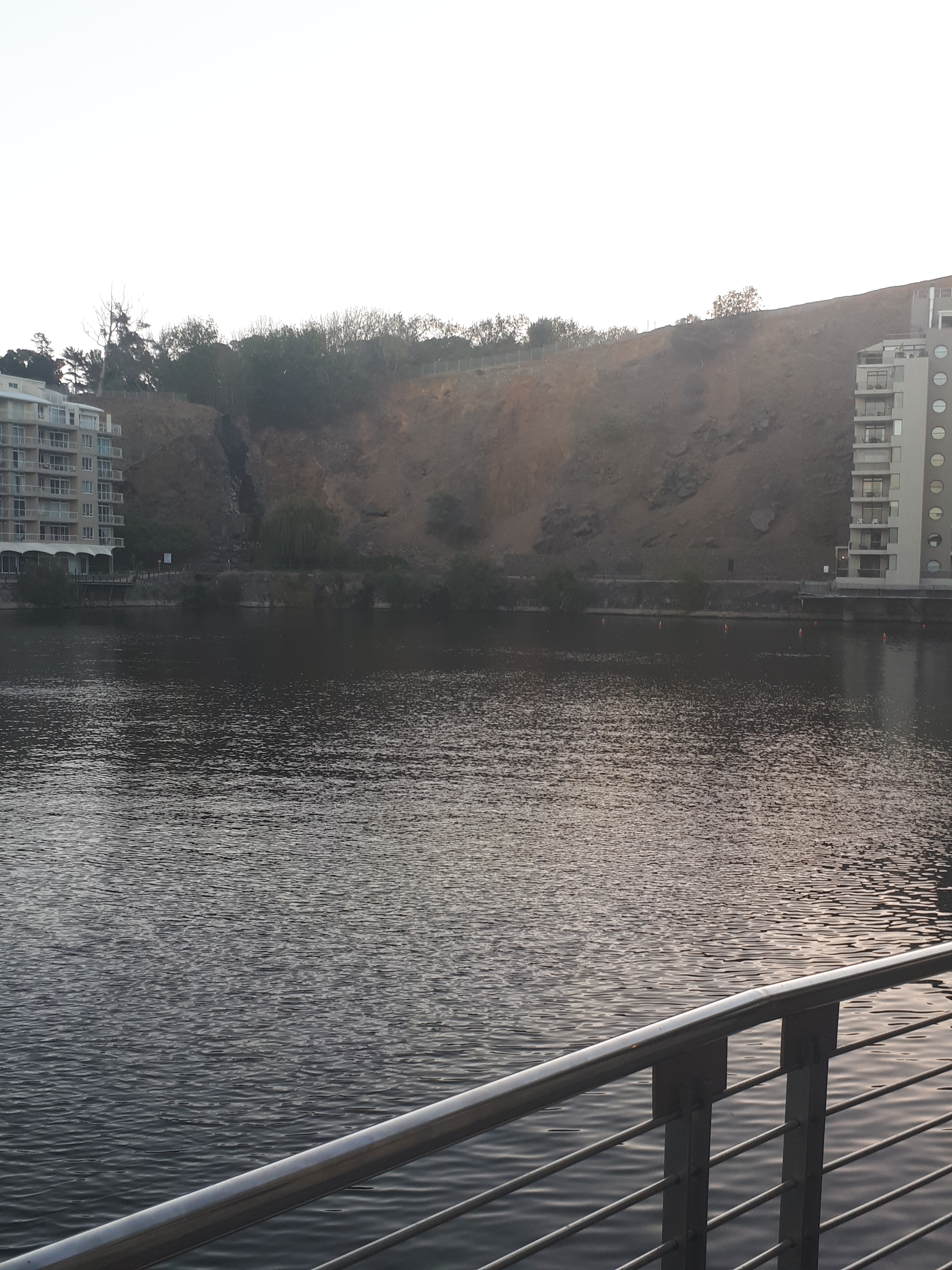
- Tyger Waterfront April 2018
- Established: 1930 -1973
- Location: Bellville, Western Cape, South Africa
- Coordinates: 33.8764°S 18.6283°E

In 1930 the owners of the land (the company “Brick and Clay") started mining activities on a 260 hectare piece of land situated in Bellville, Western Cape, South Africa. In 1936 a Jail was built next to the Quarry. Today very little of the Quarry and Jail is left and it was replaced with modern city infrastructure.

== Mining Activities ==
Hume Pipe Company mined clay and produced bricks. A railway line, through Oakdale, was built that linked it to Bellville railway station. This railway was used to transport stones. Two areas were used, one next to the quarry and one in O’Kennedyville. The quarry was an opencast activity. In 1973 there was no more clay in the Quarry. Activities were stopped and no further development took place. Barlow Rand took control over Hume Pipe Company.

== The Jail ==
The jail was built so that the prisoners could work as miners. It had a population of 600. When mining activities closed, so did the jail.

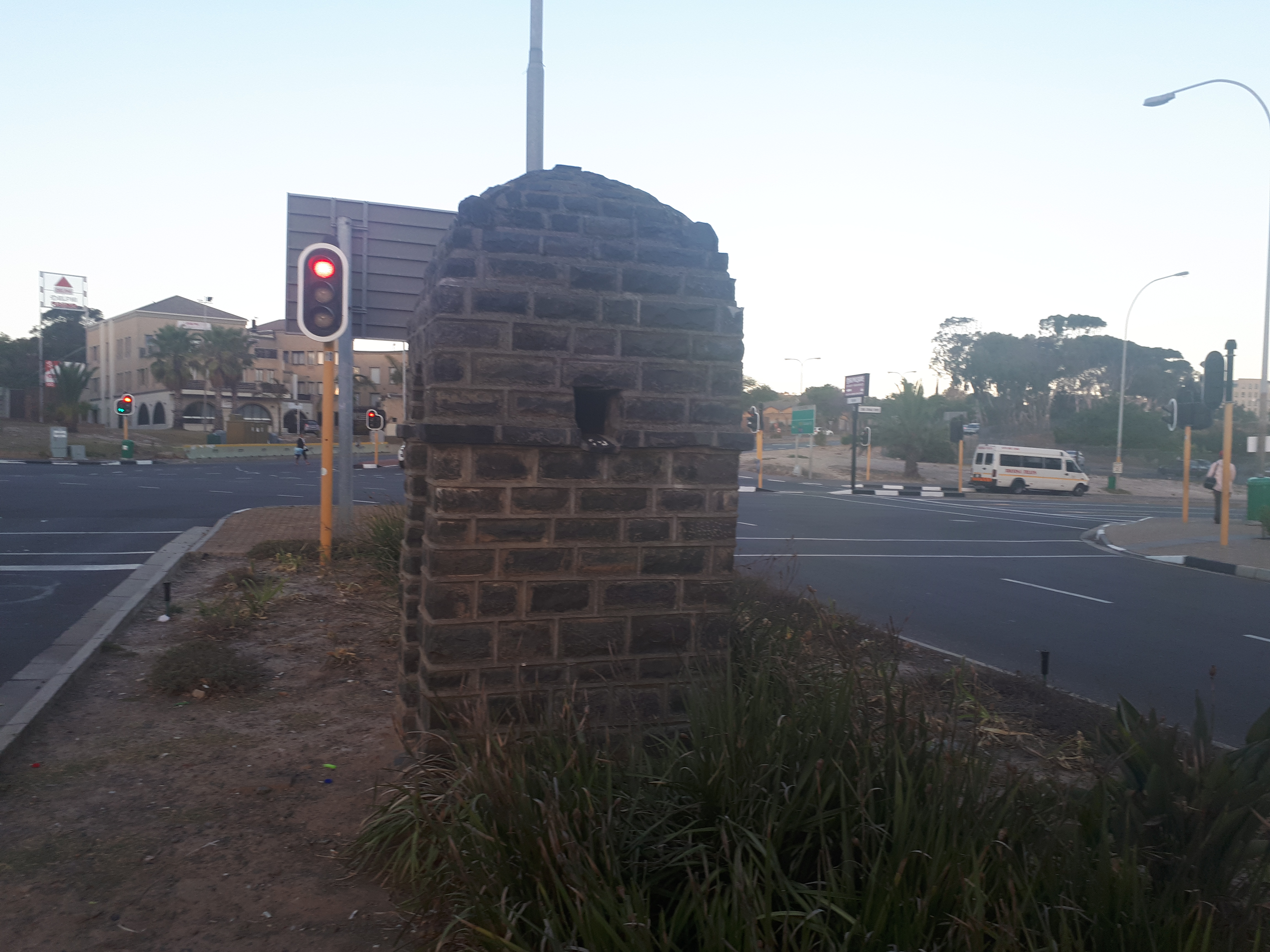
The jail next to the Quarry. The security point. That is all that's left from the jail.2018

== Developments after closing up to 1985 ==
=== The Quarry ===
It took Barlow Rand seven years to subdivide the land. They then sold it to the Bellville City Council, in 1980. In 1985 a shopping centre was built on a part of the land and opened in that year.

=== The railway line ===
The use of it stopped in 1978.

=== The terrain in O’Kennedyville ===
Offices and shops were developed (1983). Today it’s known as High Street.

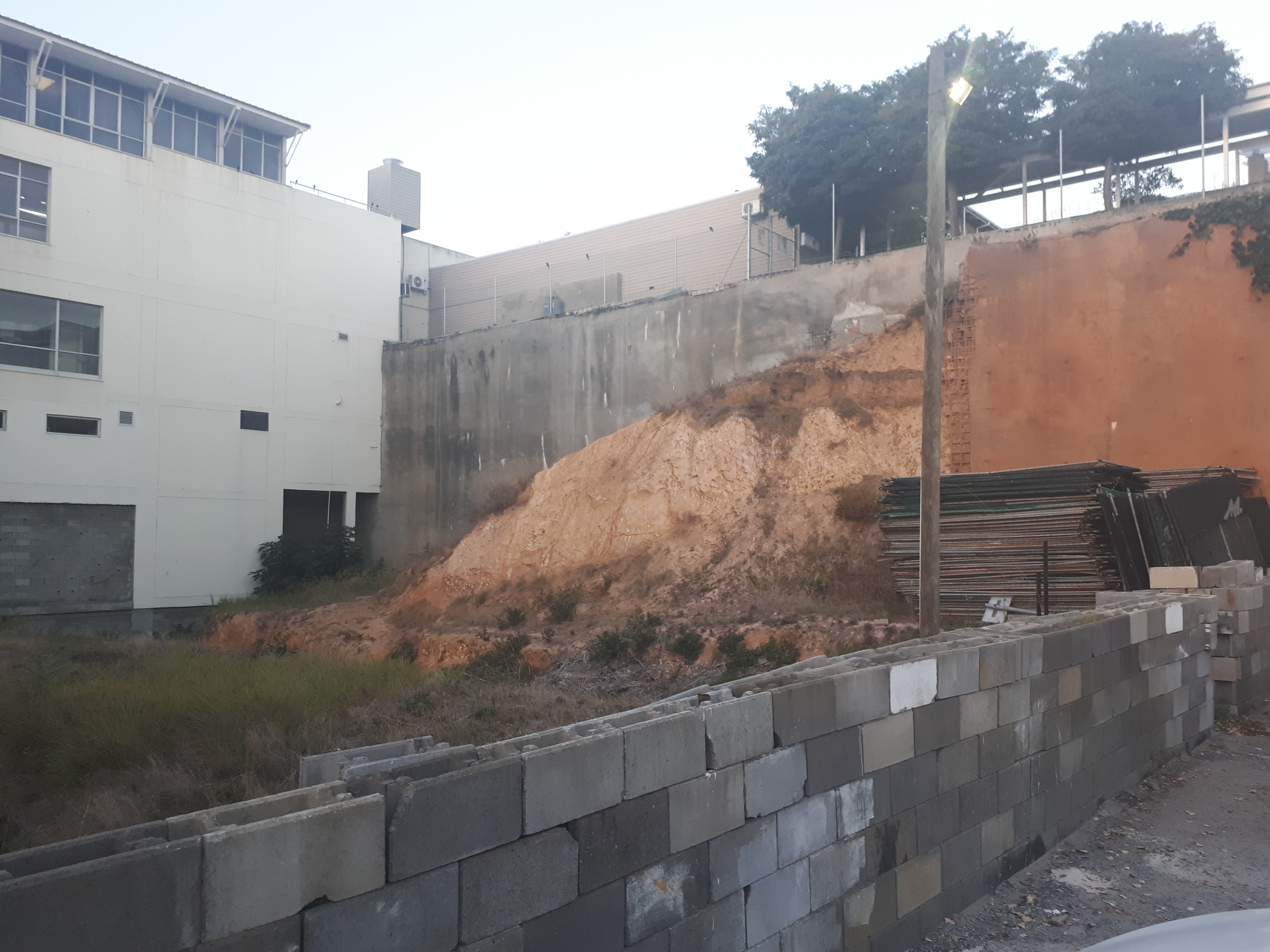
What is left of the Quarry in High Street today 2018

=== The Jail ===
It was rented out as businesses.

== Modern developments from 1986 to 2003 ==
=== The Quarry ===
An athletics track (1992), and the Bellville Velodrome for cycling (1997) was built.

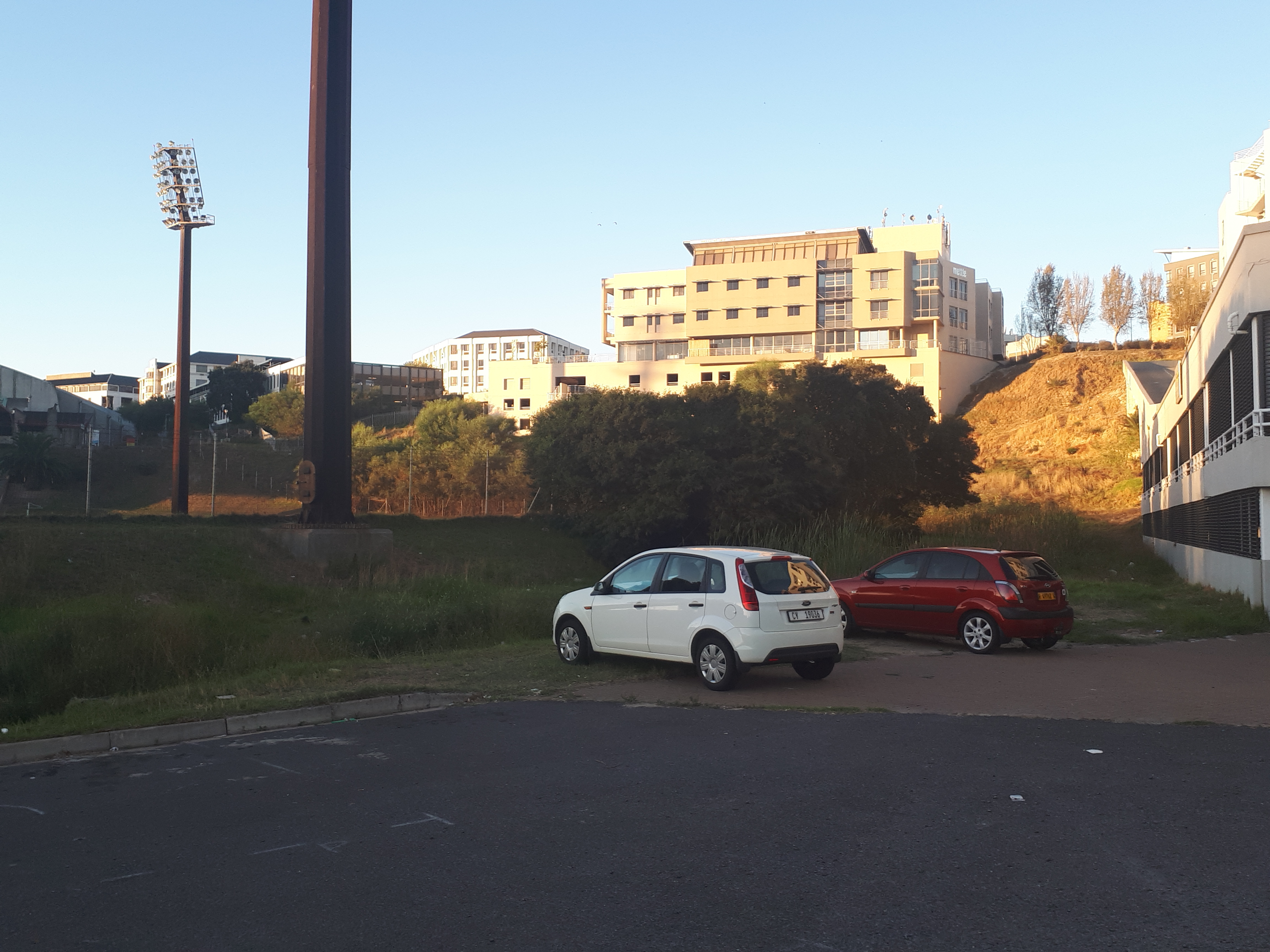
Whats left of the Quarry next to the stadium today 2018

=== The terrain next to the quarry where bricks were made ===
The University of Stellenbosch Business School was developed high up the Quarry (1986). A golf driving range was built on it (1997).

=== The remainder of the quarry and surroundings ===
The part surrounding the two dams (that originated due to the mining activity) were bought by a Mr de Lange from Namibia in 1995 In 1999 Monex Ltd started to develop the area and called it Tyger Waterfront, with residential property, shops, offices and restaurants. This was completed in 2003. A Toboggan track used for entertainment was opened in 2007. .

=== The Jail ===
In 2003 it was demolished and a second shopping centre was built on the land.
