= Kenridge, Bellville =

Kenridge
- Suburb
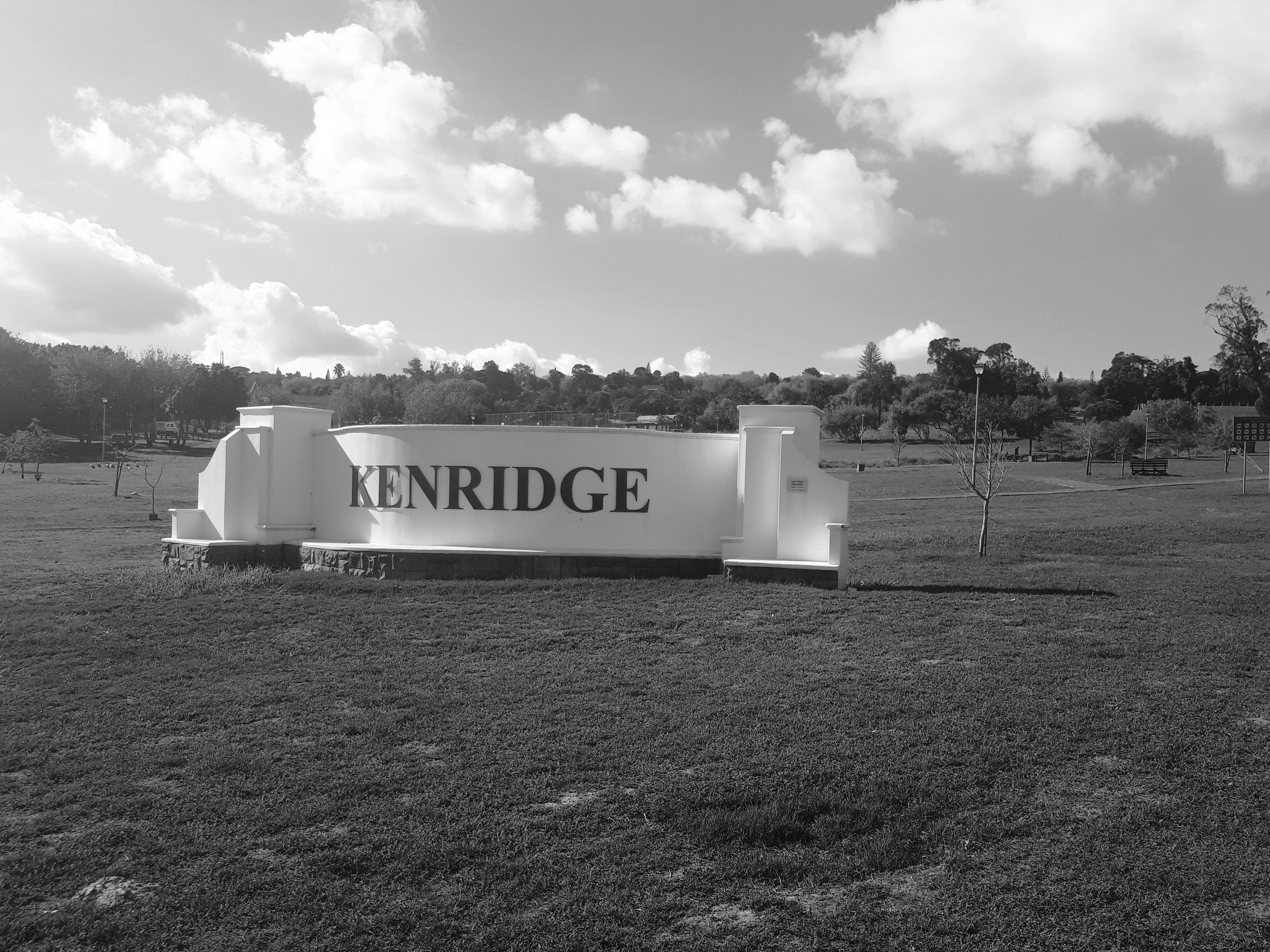
- Interactive map of Kenridge
- Coordinates: 33°51′24″S 18°38′13″E
- Country: South Africa
- Province: Western Cape
- City: Bellville
- Founded: 1948

Government
  - Body: City of Cape Town
  - Ward councillor: Ronel Viljoen (DA)
- Time zone: UTC+02:00 (SAST)
- Postcode: 7550, 7530
- Area code: 021

Kenridge is a suburb in Bellville, Western Cape, South Africa. It became a suburb out of one of the Tygerberg’s original farms.

== History ==
On 17 October 1714, the Governor of the Cape Colony awarded the Blommesteijn farm to Theuns Dirksz van Schalkwyk. Van Schalkwyk was a Dutch immigrant. In September 1732, the farm was granted to van Schalkwyk's daughter Anna Dirksz Brommert. At the same time, Brommert also received the Door de Kraal farm, which previously belonged to Tryntje Theuinisse. These two farms eventually merged into one farm, known as "Door-de-Kraal".

In 1814, ownership was transferred to Johan Albrecht Dell. In 1866, Cornelis Valkenburg de Villiers bought the farm, and his son J.H. de Villiers inherited it in 1899. He divided the farm in four parts. One part remained Door-de-Kraal and another was sold to Hume Pipe Company, who mined clay in Bellville's Quarry. De Villiers gave his son J.J.H. de Villiers a part of the farm, which was eventually known as "De Bron". The fourth part of the farm (known as "Witboom") was awarded to P.H.T. de Villiers. In 1948, P.H.T. de Villiers sold Witboom for residential development. It then became Kenridge.

== Municipal dispute ==
In 1969, a dispute arose between the municipalities of Bellville and Durbanville, as to under whose jurisdiction Kenridge fell. In January 1971, it was decided that the area of Kenridge closer to Bellville, fell under Bellville, and the area closer to Durbanville under Durbanville's jurisdiction. The area of Kenridge under Durbanville's jurisdiction was renamed to "Kenridge Heights".

== Education Facilities ==
There is only one school in Kenridge, called Kenridge Primary School (Afrikaans: Laerskool Kenridge). The school started in January 1955 in an old cowshed from one of the surrounding farms. It was nicknamed "Old Barn". The school was official opened by P. Swiegelaar on 20 September 1956.

Head Masters of Kenridge Primary School:
Name	Years of Service
P. Mashford	1955 - 1957
F. Swiegelaar	1971 - 1972
L. Hoorn	1972 - 1989
G.F. van Wyk	1989 - 1993
M. Lötter	1993 - 2010
S. Smith	2010 - 2025
C. Müller	2026 - present

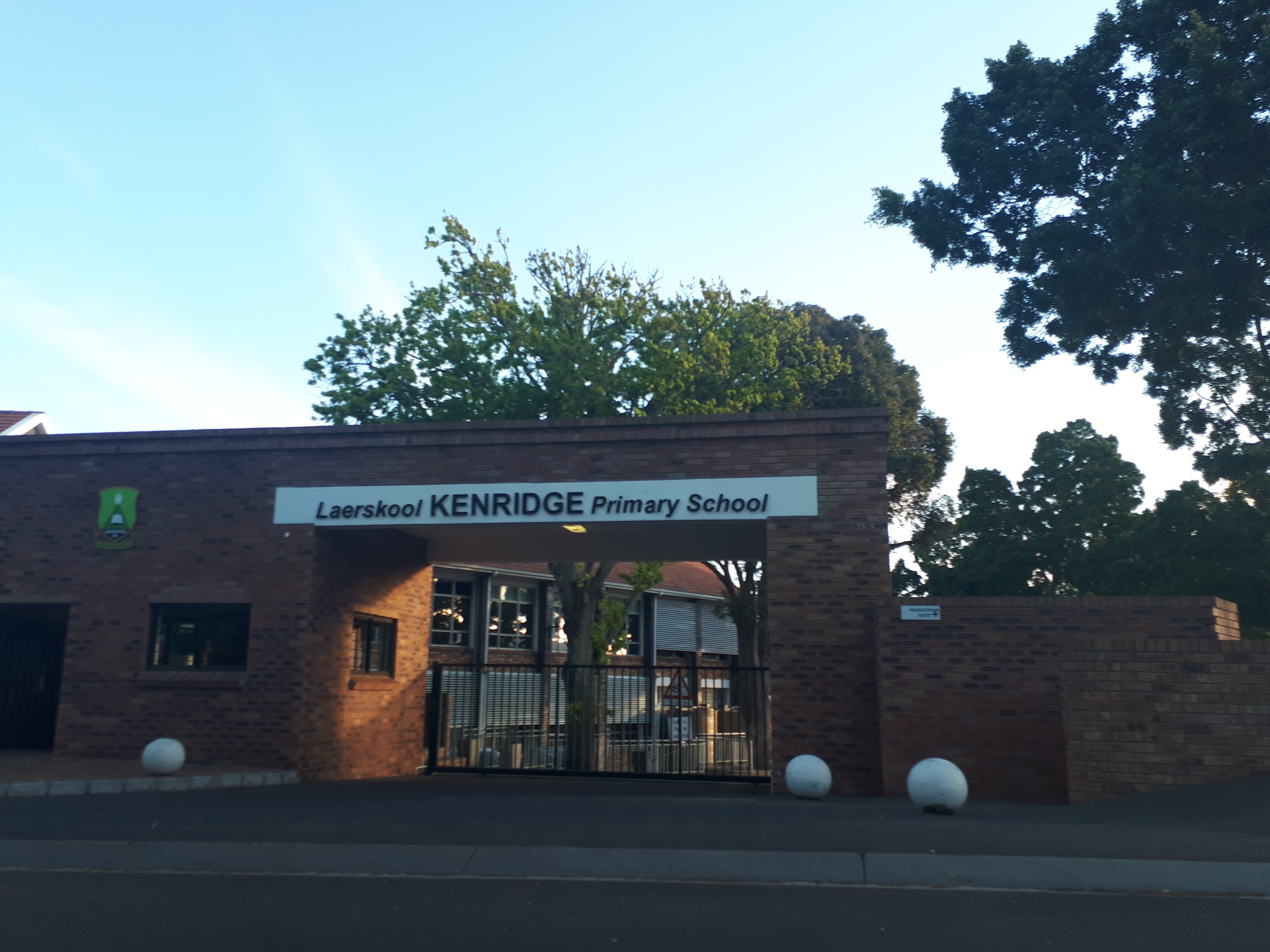
Kenridge Primary School.

== Surrounding suburbs ==
Kenridge is surrounded by other suburbs that fall under Bellville, such as Eversdal, Protea Valley and Door-de-Kraal. Kenridge is situated on the border of Bellville and Durbanville, which means that it borders certain suburbs in Durbanville as well.

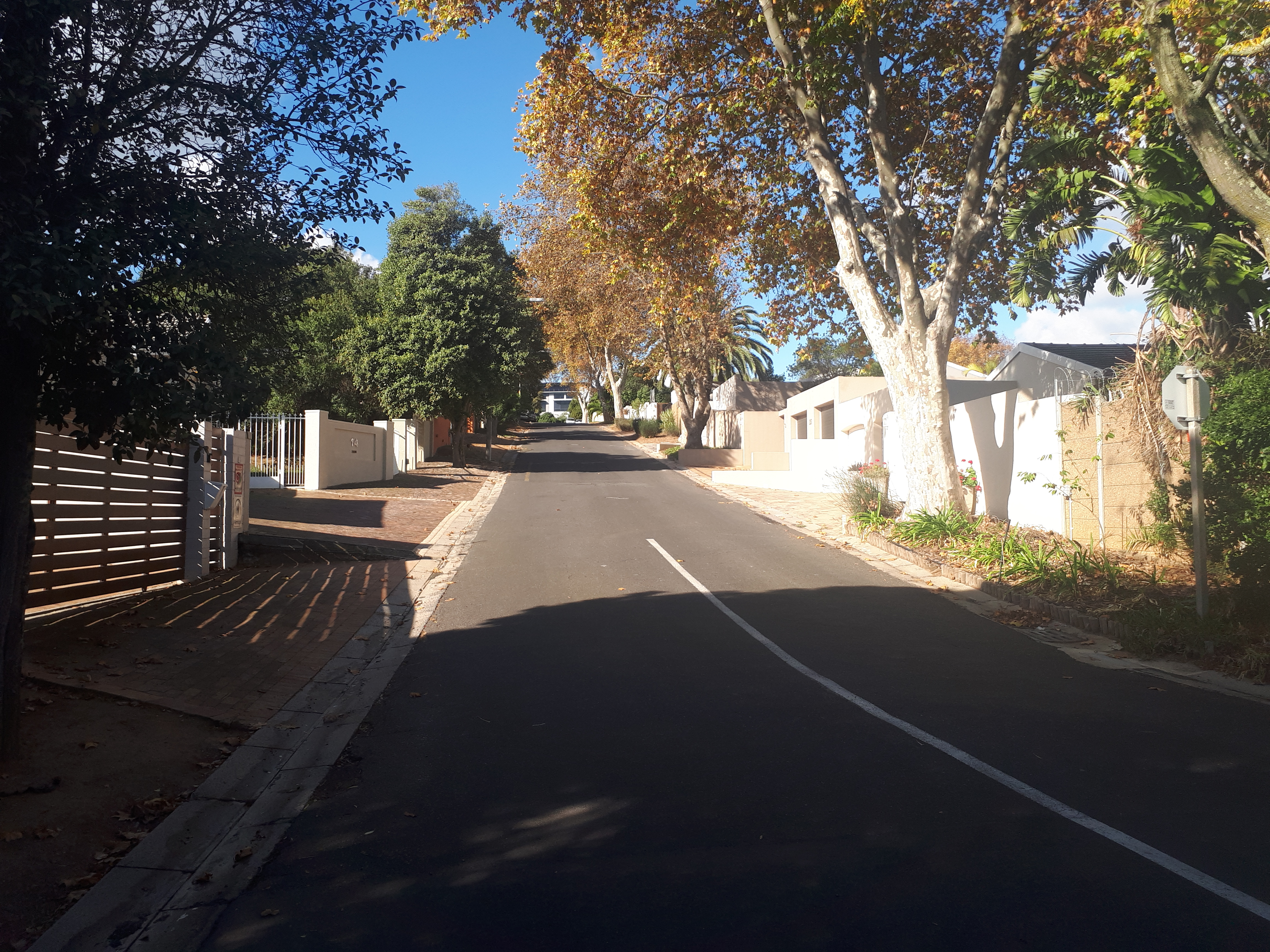
A street in Kenridge.

== Notable residents ==
- Amore Bekker Radio presenter at Radio Sonder Grense (RSG).
- Dane Piedt Off-breaker bowler for South Africa national cricket team (Proteas).
- Stiaan van Zyl All-rounder for South Africa national cricket team (Proteas).
- Jean-Luc du Plessis (son of Carel du Plessis), fly-half for the Stormers Rugby Team.

== Climate ==
Kenridge sees wet winters, with average rainfall of 465mm per year. It seldom gets colder than 7 °C and its average temperature in the months of November to February is 26 °C to 27 °C.
