= Jip de Jager =

Mayor of Bellville, Western Cape
- In office 1978–1979
- Preceded by: Meyer, M.D.
- Succeeded by: Uys, D.
- In office 1973–1975
- Preceded by: van Schoor, D.W.J.
- Succeeded by: Meyer, M.D.

Personal details
- Born: Josephus Jacobus de Jager; December 9, 1912 Kareedouw, Cape Colony, South Africa
- Died: July 7, 2000 (aged 87)
- Spouse: Helena Claudina Nel
- Education: Stellenbosch University
- Known for: German education advocacy

Josephus Jacobus de Jager (December 9, 1912 – July 7, 2000) known as Jip de Jager, was a South African politician. He served as the mayor of Bellville, Western Cape, South Africa from 1973 to 1975 and again from 1978 to 1979. Outside of politics, de Jager was a German teacher in town and an advocate for bilingual education.

== Early life ==
Jip de Jager was born on December 9, 1912, in Kareedouw, Eastern Cape South Africa, to Daniel Theodorus de Jager, a local businessman, and Martha Jacomina Gerber. He had two brothers, Daniel Theodorus (b.1924) and Philip Alexander Johannes (b.1917).

de Jager completed his undergraduate education at Stellenbosch University in 1934, where he obtained his Bachelor's and Master's degrees in German. He later received a Bachelor's Degree in 1954 from the University of South Africa and a Doctorate in Education from Potchefstroom University for Christian Higher Education

== Work life ==
=== Education field ===
He taught as a teacher in Kroonstad and Pretoria.

Potchefstroom University for Christian Higher Education appointed him as a lecturer and he later became a professor of education at the University of the Western Cape. He retired from this position in 1975.

Additionally, he served as the chairman of the Cape Province branch of the South Africa Society for the Promotion of Education.

=== Time as Mayor ===
Jip de Jager was elected Mayor of Bellville, Western Cape from 1973 to 1975 and again from 1978 to 1979. During his tenure as Mayor, de Jager achieved several notable milestones including the establishment of a district head office for the Police, the expansion of the Magisterial district to 6000 hectares, the creation of a tax authority within Bellville, and the attraction of state owned enterprises like Eskom and the Council for Scientific and Industrial Research to the area. These accomplishments led to Bellville being declared a city on 7 September 1979, a milestone marked by Gene Louw presenting de Jager with the official papers confirming the city's new status.

Between his terms as Mayor, Jip de Jager served on the Cape Provincial Council, who oversaw local administration in the West Cape province.

=== German education advocacy ===
In 1918, universities in South Africa began to offer German as a subject. However, at the high school level, only a few schools offered Germany as a third language. De Jager researched the subject by first critically evaluating the syllabus in 1946 and then developing a study guide for German in 1954. By 1960, most large Afrikaans-speaking high schools had incorporated German into their curricula.

== Books published ==
He was a prolific author, writing several books, primarily on German language education in South African schools.

In 1946, he published “'n Kritiese ondersoek na die leerplanne en leerboeke vir Duits op die Suid-Afrikaanse skole” (Translated to English: A Critical Examination of the Syllabi and Textbooks for German in South African Schools)

In 1954, he published “Die Leerboek vir Duits as derde taal aan die Suid-Afrikaanse hoërskool “. (Translated to English: The Study Guide for German as a Third Language for South African High Schools)

== Personal life ==
He was married to Helena Claudina Nel (b. 8 April 1912, d. 17 June 2002)

== Legacy ==
Jip de Jager Avenue in Bellville, Western Cape is named after Jip de Jager, who had a road named after him in Bellville, Western Cape.
