= Annette Cowley-Nel =

South African swimmer

Personal information
- National team: South Africa; England
- Born: Annette Cowley; 6 January 1967 (age 59)

Sport
- Sport: Swimming
- College team: Western Province

Annette Cowley-Nel (née Cowley, born 1967) is a retired international freestyle swimmer. She was born in South Africa to an English mother and lived in Boston, Bellville.

In the 1986 she moved to the UK and hoped to represent England in the 100m Freestyle at the 1986 Commonwealth Games in Edinburgh. Her time in her Commonwealth trial was faster than the eventual gold medal time, and she would have been favourite to win the race. However, she was disqualified, with Zola Budd, on residency grounds. At the time, South Africa was subject to an international boycott in protest of the Apartheid government. The ban was upheld by the High Court, and Cowley-Nel was unable to compete. She was subsequently unable to compete for South Africa after the country's readmittance to international sport, as she had previously represented England.

She won the 1986 ASA National Championship 100 metres freestyle title and the 200 metres freestyle.

== Personal life ==
In her youth, Cowley-Nel lived in the United States and studied in Texas. She is married to Jeremy Nel, with whom she owns Luxury Brands, a marketing and communications agency. The couple have twins girls Olivia and Georgia who will both represent South Africa at the 2026 Commonwealth Games.
