= Eversdal, Bellville =

Eversdal
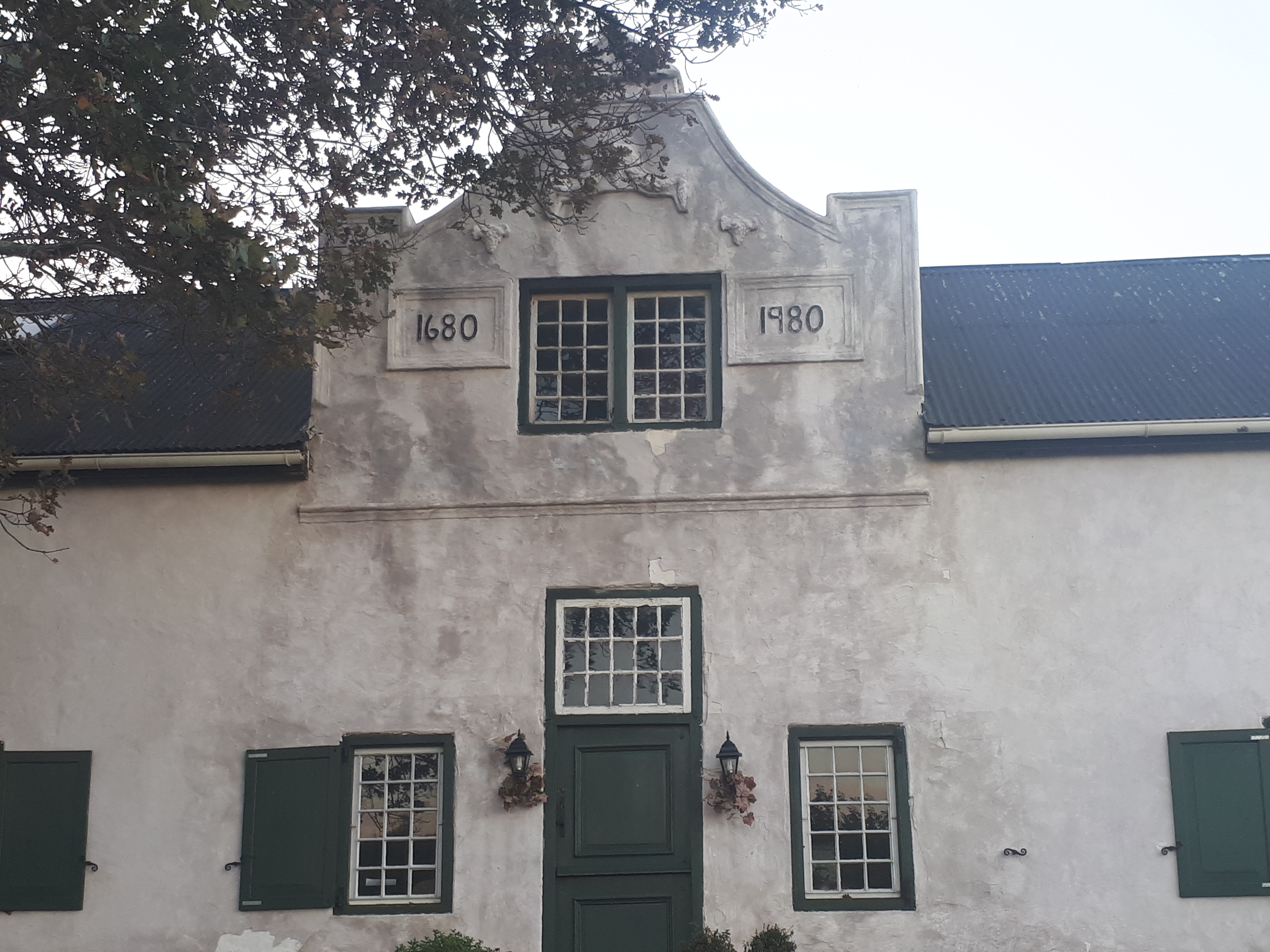
- Interactive map of Eversdal
- Coordinates: 33°51′40″S 18°39′00″E
- Country: South Africa
- Province: Western Cape
- City: Bellville
- Founded: 1680

Government
  - Body: City of Cape Town
- Time zone: UTC+02:00 (SAST)
- Postcode: 7550, 7530
- Area code: 021

Eversdal is a suburb in Bellville, Western Cape, South Africa.

== History ==
The name of the suburb of Eversdal is believed to have originated with Vryburger Evert, who was born Evert van Guinea in 1639 and ran a farming operation on today's Eversdal, Bellville, Western Cape, which grew vegetables, nuts and fruit. He leased the land from the Dutch East India Company in 1680.

The land now known as Eversdal has been owned by several people including Heinrich Omswald Eckstein (23 February 1678–23 September 1741) originally from Bad Lobenstein, Thuringia, Germany. Eckstein married Sara Heyns from the van der Merwe bloodline (1685–1713). Other family members who may be historically linked to this region are Johannes Louw (1764–1803); Pieter Joosten (born 1758), who was in the region from 1803 to 1815; and Jacobus Wynand Louw (1778–1847). Heirs of Jacobus Wynand Louw include daughter Sibella Magretha Louw (1818–1892). She married Petrus Johannes Schabort (1804–1880). The Schabort family then owned the land from 1855 into the early 20th century, when residential development began in the region.

== Location ==
Eversdal is located close to the N1 and shopping centres. The only school in the area is Eversdal Primary School. Areas bordering Eversdal are Kenridge, Stellenberg and Rosendal.

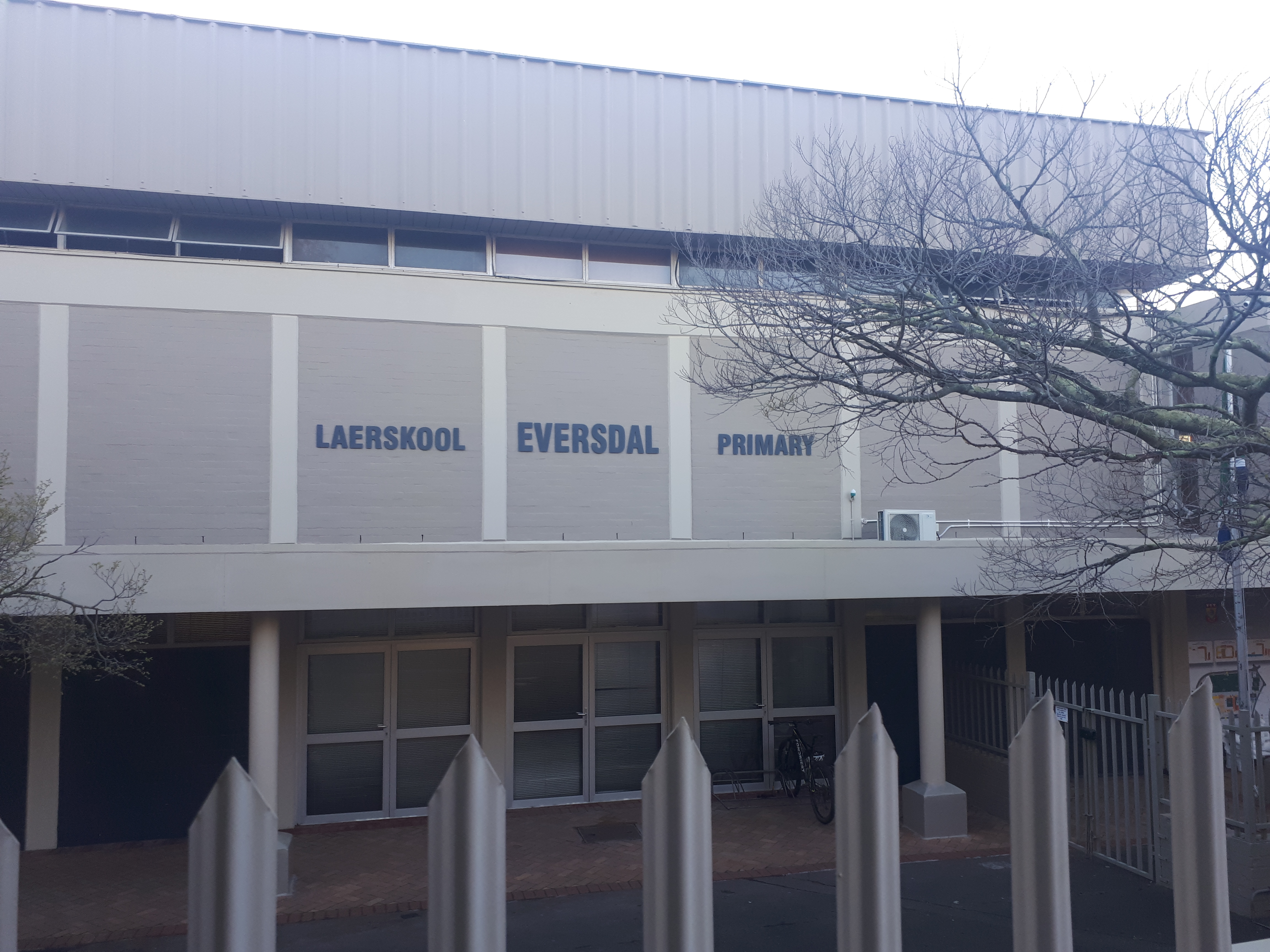
Eversdal Primary School

== Climate ==
Eversdal experiences warm, dry summers with mild, moist winters and an average rainfall of .465 m per annum. Its average coldest winter temperature is 7.1 °C overnight with an average summer daytime temperature of 27 °C.
