= Bellville, South Africa =

Town in Western Cape, South Africa

Bellville
- City
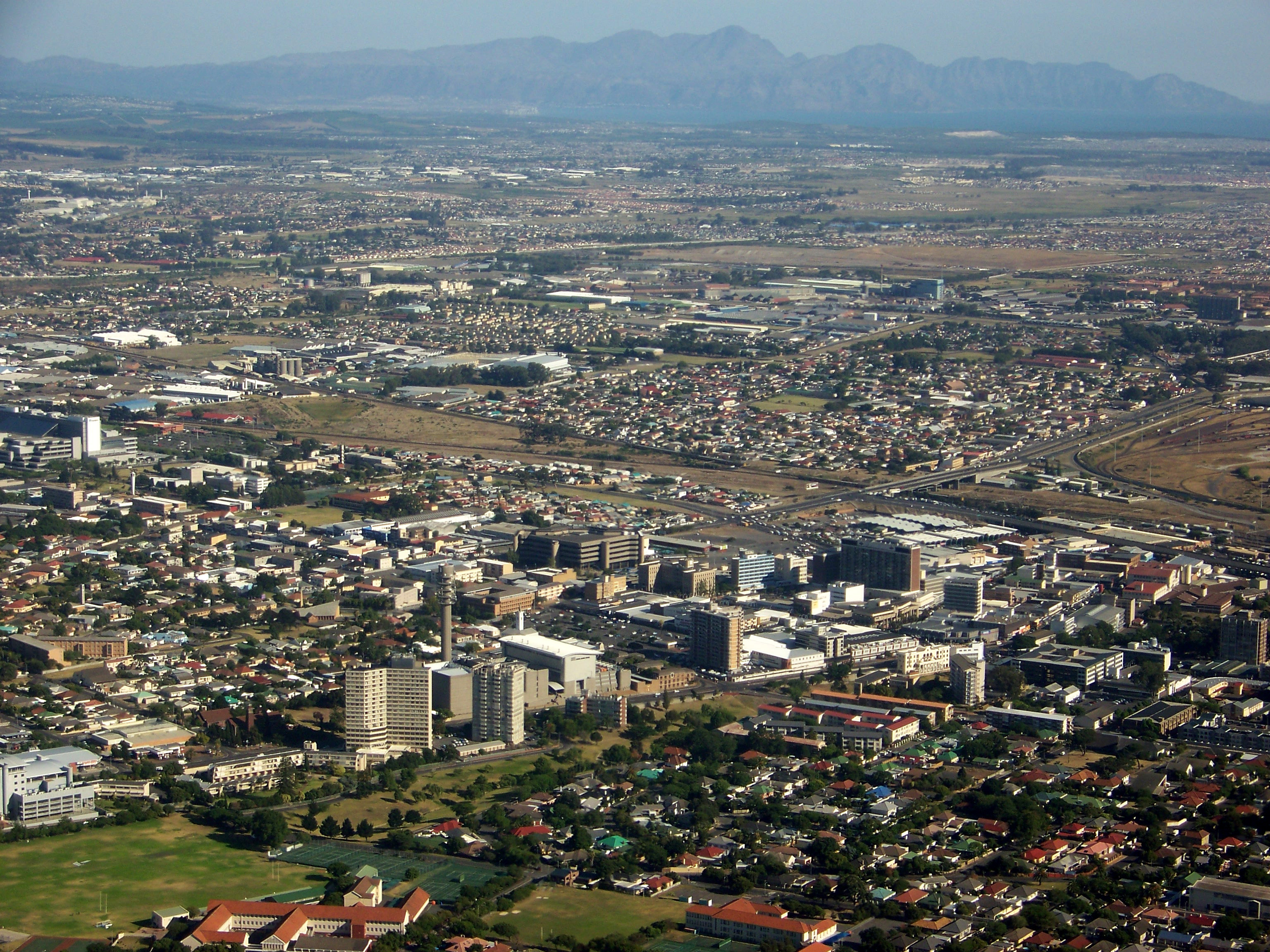
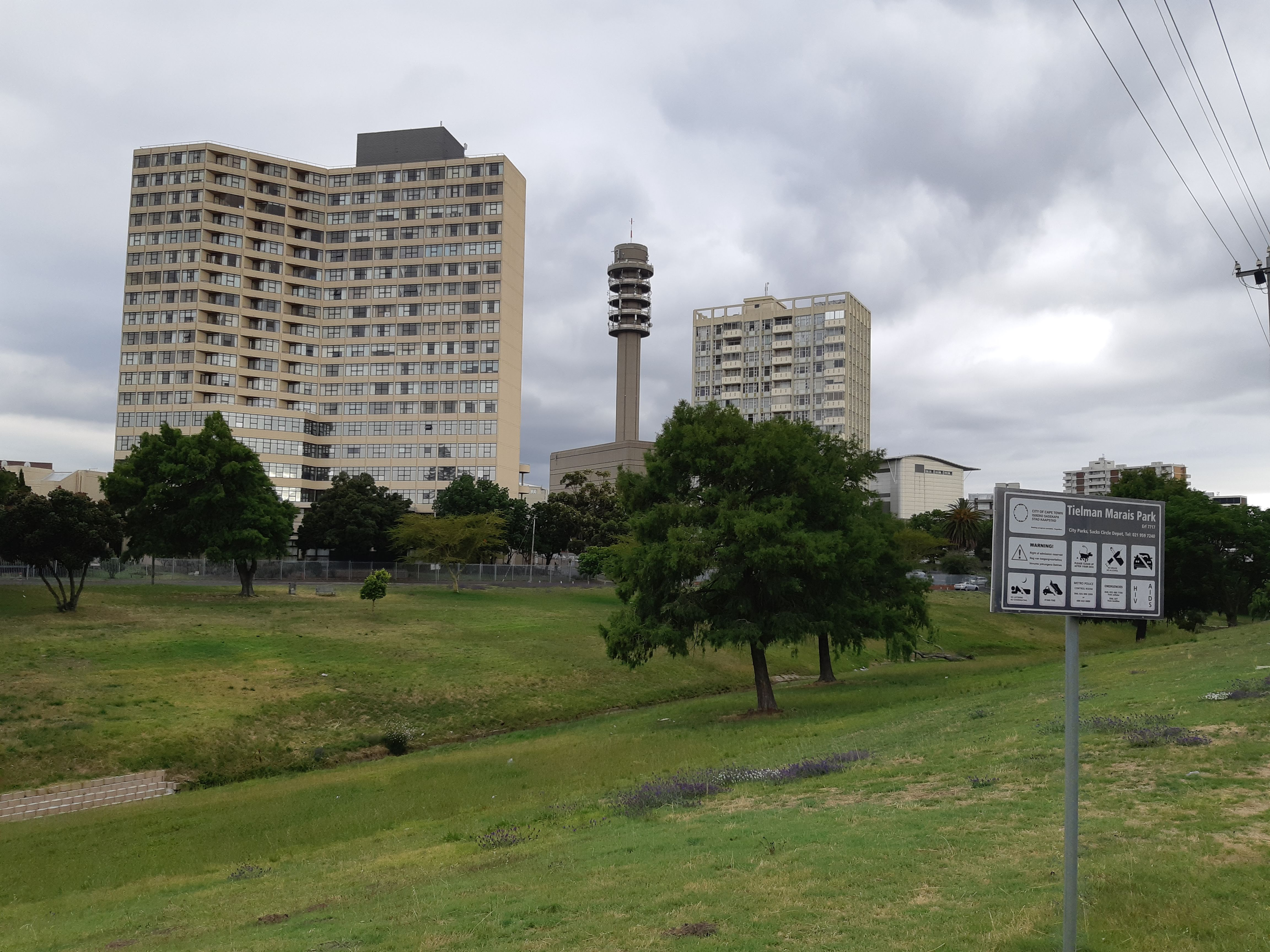
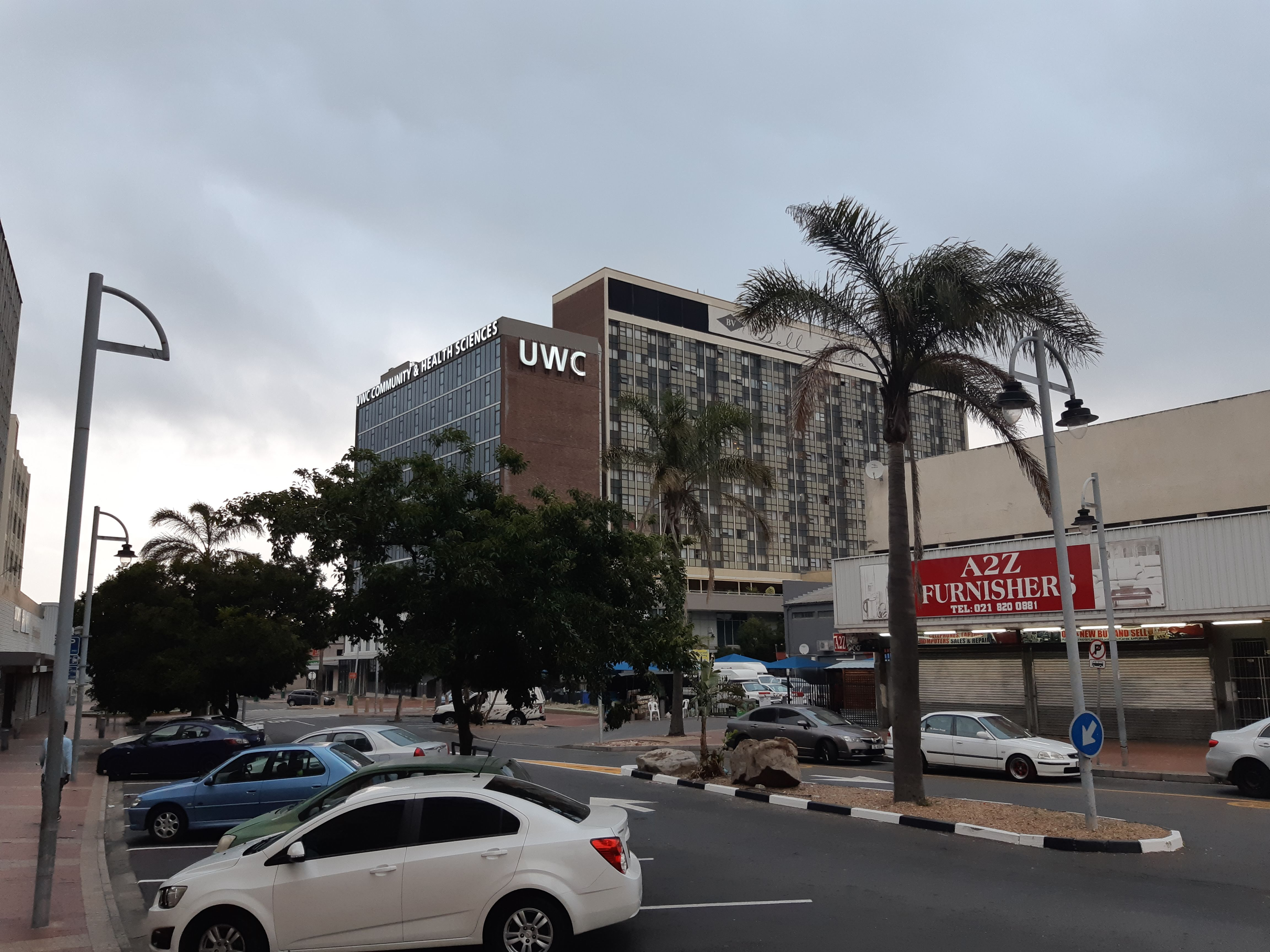
- From top, an areal view of Bellville CBD with Kogelberg Mountains and False Bay in distance. Bottom left, Bellville town center and TV tower as seen from Tielman Marais Park. Bottom right, University of the Western Cape Community and Health Sciences faculty at its Bellville campus.

- Coat of arms

- Location within Western Cape Location within South Africa Location within Africa
- Coordinates: 33°54′00″S 18°38′00″E
- Country: South Africa
- Province: Western Cape
- Municipality: City of Cape Town
- Established: 1861

Government
  - Councillor: Ronél Viljoen (DA)

Area
  - Total: 52.39 km^{2} (20.23 sq mi)

Population (2011)
  - Total: 112,507
  - Density: 2,147/km^{2} (5,562/sq mi)

Racial makeup (2011)
  - Black African: 15.7%
  - Coloured: 29.4%
  - Indian/Asian: 1.5%
  - White: 50.3%
  - Others: 3.1%

First languages (2011)
  - Afrikaans: 65.4%
  - English: 25.2%
  - Xhosa: 2.5%
  - Others: 7.0%
- Time zone: UTC+2 (SAST)
- Postal code (street): 7530
- PO box: 7535
- Area code: 021

Bellville is a large town in the Western Cape, South Africa, and is part of the Northern Suburbs of Cape Town. Having formerly been an independent city, it was later incorporated into the City of Cape Town Metropolitan Municipality.

The town is an industrial and commercial node, a university town, and a major transportation hub within the greater Cape Town metropolitan area.

The residential suburb of Bellville lies approximately 23 kilometres (14.3 mi) north-east of Cape Town and 38 kilometres (23.6 mi) south-west of Paarl set amongst the Tygerberg Hills with views over the Cape Fold Mountains. Vehicle registrations in Bellville start with CY which also covers the Tygerberg areas of Durbanville, Parow and Goodwood. The plates resulted in a local saying, "Come to Bellville and CY".

== Establishment ==
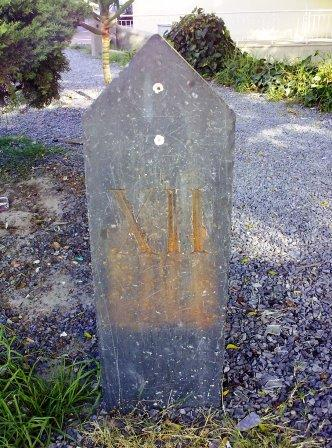
12-mile stone

It was founded as "12 Mile Post" (Afrikaans: "12-Myl-Pos") because it is located 12 miles (20 km) from Cape Town city centre. It was first known as "Hardekraaltjie". Founded as a railway station on the line from Cape Town to Stellenbosch and Strand, it was renamed Bellville in 1861 after the surveyor-general Charles Bell.

== Hospitals and educational institutes ==
The Karl Bremer Hospital functioned as the Academic Hospital for the University of Stellenbosch Medical School, but now the adjacent Tygerberg Hospital houses the medical school. Other hospitals in Bellville are: Mediclinic International Louis Leipoldt and Melomed. The Cape Peninsula University of Technology, University of the Western Cape, University of Stellenbosch Business School and Northlink College are also situated in Bellville. DF Akademie, Bellville High School, Westcliff School of Skills, The Settlers High School and Stellenberg High School are located in the area. Primary Schools are: Bellpark, Bellville, Bellville-North, Boston, Eversdal, Excelsior, Kenridge, Mimosa, Totius, Belville Islamic Primary School, Vredelust and Welgemoed.

== Other places of interest ==
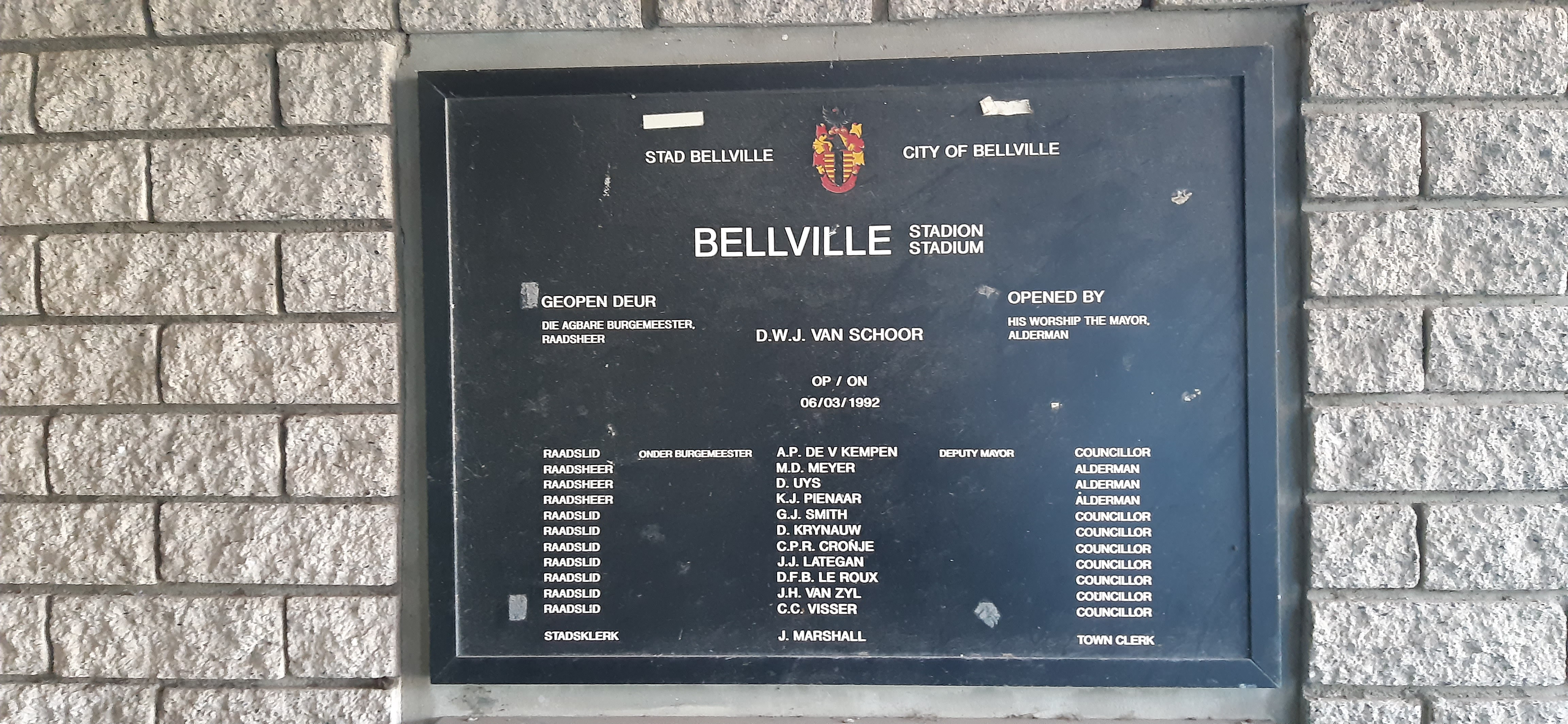
Opening Plaque for Bellville Stadium in 1992

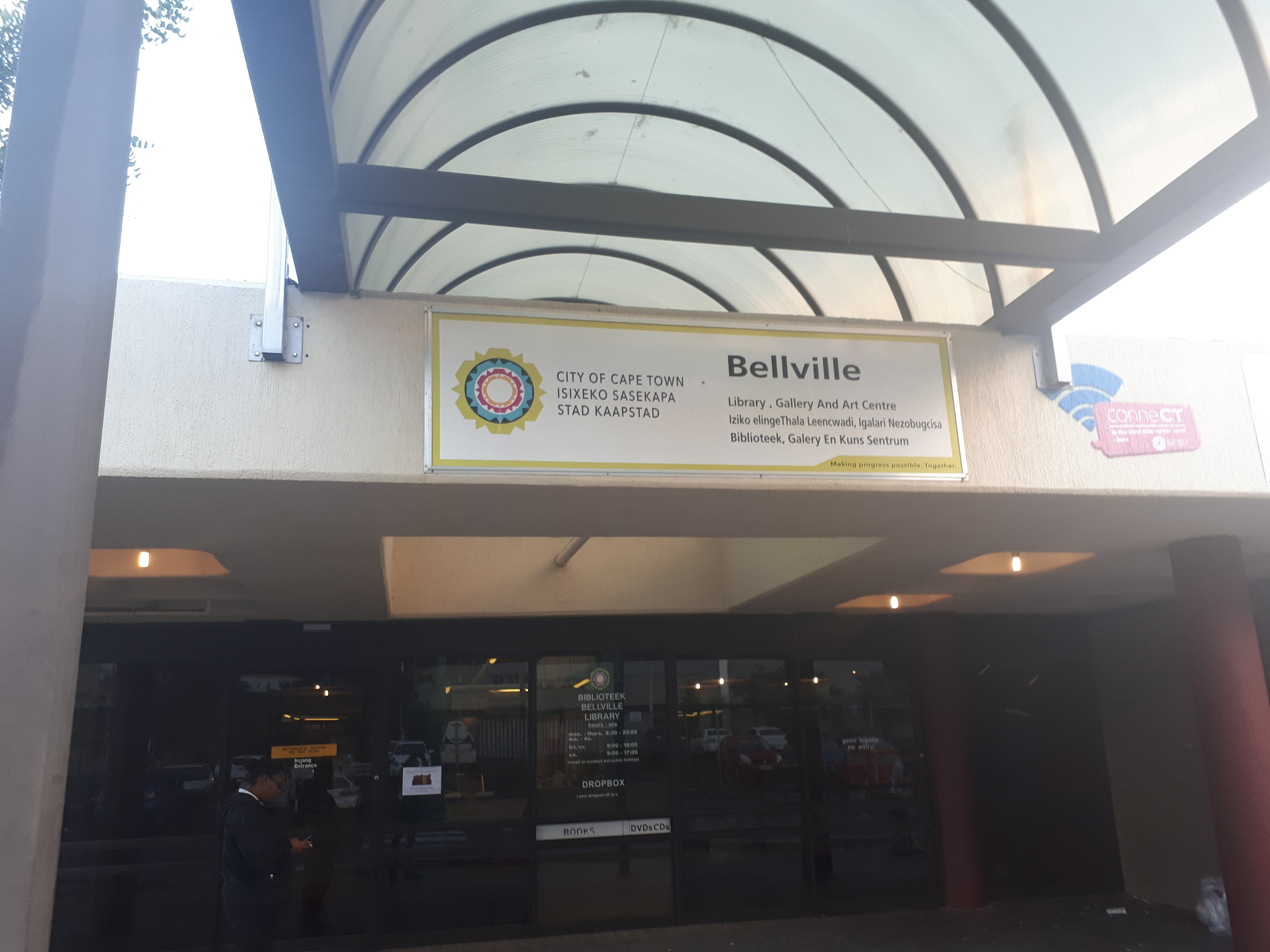
Bellville Library 2018

The Bellville Velodrome is located in the Tyger Valley area of Bellville. The Bellville Velodrome has an indoor cycling track and is next to the Bellville athletics track that used to host the annual MTBS athletics competition. Bellville Mall, Tygervalley Shopping centre and Willow Bridge are shopping centres in Bellville. The last two shopping centres were built on the grounds that used to be a quarry and a jail.

Other sports an entertainment includes Bellville library, Bellville swimming pool , Cool Runnings, and PP Smit Sport fields

== Economy ==
=== Major companies ===
Bellville is one of the main business nodes in the Greater Cape Town metropolitan area, home to the headquarters of major corporations such as insurance giant, Sanlam and its subsidiary Santam, Metropolitan, Pioneer Foods and its subsidiary Bokomo, Bet.co.za, Curro Independent Schools, Cipla South Africa, Medi-Rite, Vital Health Foods, Footgear, Afrimat and the Bible Society of South, with most of these companies headquartered in the Tyger Valley commercial node.

Many provincial and local government departments maintain regional branches or other offices in Bellville such as Eskom, Department of Water and Sanitation (Western Cape), Water and Sanitation Department (City of Cape Town) and Electricity Services (City of Cape Town).

=== Supply chain ===
Bellville is home to Danish shipping and logistics company Maersk's Belcon Cold Store facility, one of the Western Cape's largest cold storage sites in terms of capacity, at approximately 32,000 pallet positions as of April 2026. The facility primarily supports table grape and citrus exports.

== Geography ==
Bellville forms the centre of the Northern Suburbs, and is situated between the low-lying Cape Flats to the south and the rolling hills of Tygerberg to the north. It lies at an average altitude of about 80 m (262 ft) above sea level, with the altitude gradually rising towards the north where the suburb of Welgemoed on the slopes of the Tygerberg Hill lies at the highest altitude of 310 m (1017 ft). The town borders Durbanville to the north, Parow to the west, Brackenfell to the east, Kuilsrivier to the southeast and Belhar to the south.

=== Suburbs ===
The central business district of Bellville, also known as Bellville Central, situated along Voortrekker Road, is the traditional commercial hub of the town and contains several high-rise buildings and structures, with the Telkom communications tower dominating the skyline. The suburbs north of the N1 highway include the most wealthy and developed parts of the town, spreading north to the border with Durbanville and up the Tygerberg Hill which overlooks the Cape Town metropolitan area. The suburbs south of the CBD tend to be either solely industrial or solely residential and are included in one of Bellville’s lowest income brackets. The suburbs east and west of Bellville tend to be mostly quiet and established residential areas, with the exception of Stikland, an industrial area situated in the far east of Bellville.

The 2011 census listed the following areas as suburbs under the main place of Bellville:

==== East ====
- Avondstil
- Belgravia
- Bellair
- Blommendal
- Blomtuin
- Chrismar
- Groenvallei
- Harry de Villiers
- Heemstede
- Hillrise
- Joubertsingel
- Kempenville
- Kingston
- Labiance
- La Rochelle
- Laurindale
- Loumar
- Manieoord
- Meyerhof
- Oakdale
- Oakglen
- Runkel
- Shirley Park
- Stikland
- Sunkist
- Sunray
- Thalmen
- Vosfontein
- Vredenburg

==== North ====
- Amanda Glen
- Bellville Park
- Bethanie
- Bloemhof
- Blomvlei
- Bo-Oakdale
- Danena
- De Bron
- Door de Kraal
- East Rock
- Eversdal
- Glen Ive
- Hoheizen
- Kanonberg
- Kenridge
- Loevenstein
- Oude Westhof
- O’Kennedyville
- Pascall
- Protea Valley
- Ridgeworth
- Rosendal
- Rosenpark
- Selborne
- Silverstream
- Stellenberg
- Stellenridge
- Stellenryk
- Van Riebeeckshof
- Welgedacht
- Welgemoed
- Welgemoed Greens

==== South ====
- Bellville South
- Bellville South Industrial
- Belrail
- Blanc Kelly
- Glenhaven
- Mimosa
- Sacks Circle Industrial
- Triangle Farm

==== West ====
- Bellville West
- Bosbell
- Boston
- Grahamdale
- Joostenville
- Vredelust

== Infrastructure ==
=== Transportation ===
==== Rail ====
Bellville is a subhub for the Metrorail Western Cape with the Northern Line (Cape Town-Wellington) trains serving Bellville, Parow, Goodwood, Cape Town, Brackenfell, Kraaifontein, Paarl and Wellington. The smaller Bellville-Strand Line branches off from the Northern Line, serving Bellville, Kuilsrivier, Eersterivier, Stellenbosch (via Stellenbosch branch line), Somerset West and Strand.

Bellville is also a major hub for Transnet Freight Rail containing a major container terminal, Belcon, directly south of the CBD, officially opened by Transnet in 2010. The container terminal, which serves as a dry port is connected to the Port of Cape Town via rail, as well as the rest of South Africa by road and rail and acts as a break-of-bulk point for container trucks transporting goods to and from the Port of Cape Town.

==== Roads ====
The N1 is the major freeway that runs through Bellville, roughly running SW to NE from Cape Town to Paarl. The R300 (Kuils River Freeway) connects the N1 at the Stellenberg Interchange with Mitchells Plain to the south.

The R101 starts at the intersection with the M30 and runs north-east towards Brackenfell as Old Paarl Road. The R102 runs through the centre of Bellville from Parow in the west to Kuilsrivier in the south-east as Voortrekker Road (in Bellville Central) and Strand Road. The R302 is a major artery between Bellville and Durbanville, running north from Bellville Central as Durban Road, Willie van Schoor Avenue and Durbanville Avenue.

Bellville is also served by a network of metropolitan routes linking it to surrounding suburbs including the M10 to Cape Town International Airport in the south, M16 to Durbanville in the north and Tygerberg Hospital in the south, M23 to Stellenbosch in the south-east, M25 to Brackenfell in the east, M31 to Durbanville, M73 to Brackenfell, M124 to Durbanville and the M171 to Delft in the south. The town is also served internally by metropolitan routes including the M11 (provides a bypass to the south of Bellville Central), M30, M121 and M189.

== Parks and recreation ==
Bellville contains several public parks and recreational dams within its neighbourhoods most notably Jack Muller Danie Uys Park in Boston, north of the town centre where the Parkrun Bellville takes place every Saturday, Majik Forest on the northern outskirts of Bellville, Door de Kraal Dam in the north of Bellville and Rosendal Dam in the north of Bellville. In addition, the Tygerberg Nature Reserve is set above Bellville on the Tygerberg Hills to the north-west and offers scenic views across the Greater Cape Town metropolitan area.

Golf is also one of the main recreational activities performed in Bellville with the Bellville Golf Club being the main golf course in the town, lying on the slopes of the northern suburb of Welgemoed and the Golf Village Tygervalley, a driving range in Tyger Valley.

== Constituency ==
The town was a constituency in the Cape Peninsula, Cape Town, Cape Province in the South African House of Assembly starting in 1933. The first elected member was FHP Creswell (b. 13 November 1866, d. 28 August 1948). In 1939 it was not a constituency any more. In 1953 it regained constituency status and JFW Haak won. Haak retained this until 1970, when Louis Pienaar took over from him. In 1975 AT van der Merwe took over from him.

== Municipality ==
Bellville was a municipality from 1940 to 1996, and was given the status of a city on 7 September 1979.

=== Mayors of Bellville ===
1. 1940–1943 van Niekerk, Andries Joseph (born 14 May 1882, died 30 April 1953) married Athalia Solms (born 4 August 1876)
2. 1943–1944 Blanckenberg, Josias Jacobus (born 10 March 1907, died 21 October 1992)
3. 1944–1949 van Niekerk, Andries Joseph. Second term see no 1
4. 1949–1950 Haak, Jan Friedrich Wilhelm (born 20 April 1917, died 16 February 1993) married Maria Smuts Theron (born 1 August 1917). Jan Haak was also the Minister of Economy in the South African Government from 1967 to 1970. He was also as member of the National Party, representing Bellville in Parliament.
5. 1950–1952 Duminy, Hendrik Cornelis van Niekerk (born 6 September 1899, died 29 March 1974) married Frieda Moolman.
6. 1952–1953 Sacks, Alec (born 14 April 1913, died 29 May 1974) married Anita Joseph(born 15 March 1922)
7. 1953–1954 West, Adam Johannes (born 7 August 1905, died 30 November 1983) married Maria Margaretha Visser. AJ West Street in Boston Bellville is named after him.
8. 1954–1956 Barnard, Johannes Hendrik (born 3 September 1891, died 17 October 1956) married Lucia Ruth Mosel. Barnard Street in Oakdale Bellville is named after him.
9. 1956–1958 Meyer, Petrus Hendrik (born 7 September 1926) married Stephanie Swart (born 20 November 1926)
10. 1958–1961 van Riet, Willem Frederik (born 11 July 1910, died 9 December 1988) married Augusta Dorothy de Villiers (born 31 August 1909)
11. 1961–1963 Pienaar, Michiel Hendrik de Wet (born 12 October 1900) married Anna Susanna Siebrits(born 22 May 1904) Mike Pienaar Boulevard in Bellville West is named after him.
12. 1963–1966 Bezuidenhout, Willem Johannes (born 12 October 1900) married Mona Havenga (born 12 January 1903). Bill Bezuidenhout Avenue in Blomtuin Bellville is named after him.
13. 1966–1969 Pienaar, Michiel Hendrik de Wet.Second term see no 11
14. 1969–1971 Smit, Pieter Philip (born 8 March 1917, died 10 October 1997). The PP Smit sport fields in Durban Road Bellville is named after him.
15. 1971–1973 Meyer, Martinus Daniel (born 21 June 1918) married Mary Elizabeth Weidemann (born 18 July 1925) . Tienie Meyer Bypass is named after him.
16. 1973–1975 de Jager, Josephus Jacobus (born 9 December 1912, died 7 July 2000) married Helena Claudina Nel(born 8 August 1912). Jip de Jager Drive in Welgemoed Bellville is named after him.
17. 1975–1977 Uys, Daniel(born 3 June 1932) married Beatrix Hendina Moorrees (born 5 September 1934). Danie Uys Park in Boston Bellville is named after him.
18. 1977–1978 van Schoor, Daniel Willem Jacobus (born 31 March 1935, died 14 August 2001) married Johanna Elizabeth Coetzee (born 2 September 1937). Willie van Schoor Drive in Bellville is named after him.
19. 1978–1979 de Jager, Josephus Jacobus. Second term see no 16
20. 1979–1981 Meyer, Martinus Daniel Second term see no 15
21. 1981–1983 Pienaar, Kristo Johannes (born 4 July 1922, died 6 April 1996) married Christina Wilhelmina van Rooyen (born 24 May 1921)
22. 1983–1985 Uys, Daniel. Second term see no 17
23. 1985–1986 Kleynhans, PH
24. 1986–1987 Meyer, Martinus Daniel. Third term see no 15
25. 1987–1989 Pienaar, Kristo Johannes. Second term see no 21
26. 1989–1991 van Schoor, Daniel Willem Jacobus. Second term see no 18
27. 1991–1994 Kempen, Abraham Petrus de Villiers (born 23 March 1920, died 29 June 2010) married Bramie Joubert (born 18 December 1919). The Awie Kempen Vehicle Testing Grounds is named after him.
28. 1994–1996 Cronje, Carl Peter Roche (born 10 July 1932, died 2 November 2018) married Miriam Lauretta Sadie.(born 7 April 1933). Carl Cronje Drive is named after him.

In April 1982 P. W. Botha received honorary citizenship of the city.

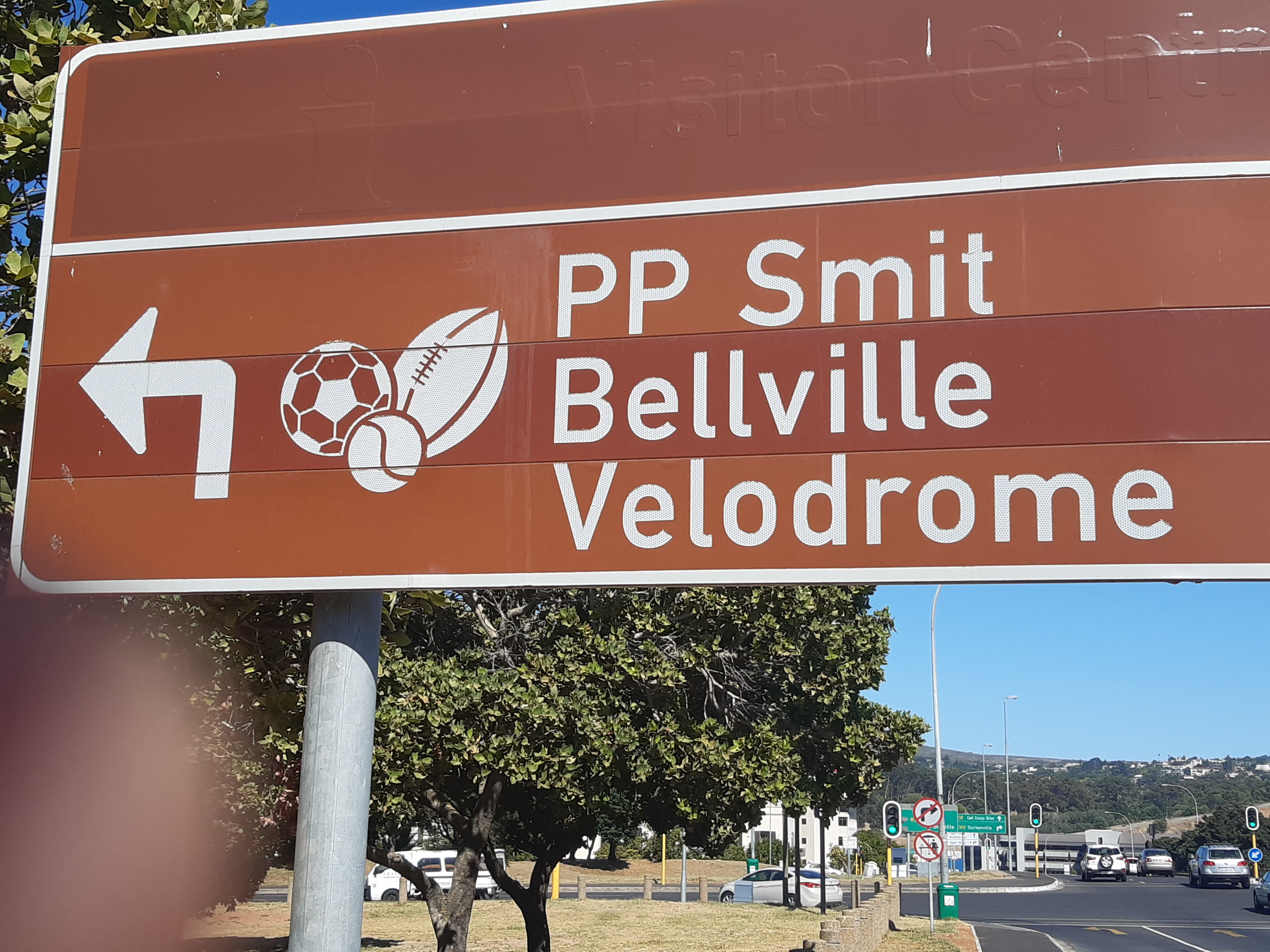
Information road sign for PP Smit Sportsfields from Durban Road

== Coat of arms ==
Bellville civic coat of arms

The municipal council assumed a coat of arms on 18 June 1947. It later altered the arms, three times, before settling on the final version in 1979. The shield was divided into twelve horizontal bars of red and gold, representing the original village name of "Twaalfmyl". A black vertical band ("pale") down the centre displayed two silver hawk's bells, between which was a small blue shield displaying a golden sheaf of wheat. The crest was a black eagle, and the motto Prendre sa belle. Some time later, the blue shield was removed, and the wheatsheaf was placed directly on the black pale. In 1957, the wheatsheaf was replaced with a third hawk's bell. This version of the arms, re-drawn by Ivan Mitford-Barberton, was registered with the Cape Provincial Administration in February 1959.

The final version of the arms, as amended by Cornelis Pama in 1979, replaced the hawk's bells with church bells. In this form, the arms were registered at the Bureau of Heraldry in February 1980. The registered blazon was : Barry of twelve Gules and Or, on a pale Sable three church bells Argent.

== Media ==
- In May 2007, Meg Ryan and William H. Macy completed the last day of photography for their movie, The Deal, at the Bellville Civic Centre.
- The novel 2 Dae in Mei (English: 2 Days in May) by Jaco Fouché takes place in Bellville.

== Notable people ==
- Neil de Kock - South Africa national rugby union team player
- Vernon Philander - South Africa national cricket team player
- Yolandi Potgieter - South Africa national women's cricket team player
- Con de Lange – South Africa national cricket team player
- Francois Van Coke - Lead singer of Fokofpolisiekar
