= Tygerberg Hospital =

Hospital in Parow, Western Cape, South Africa

- Western Cape Department of Health
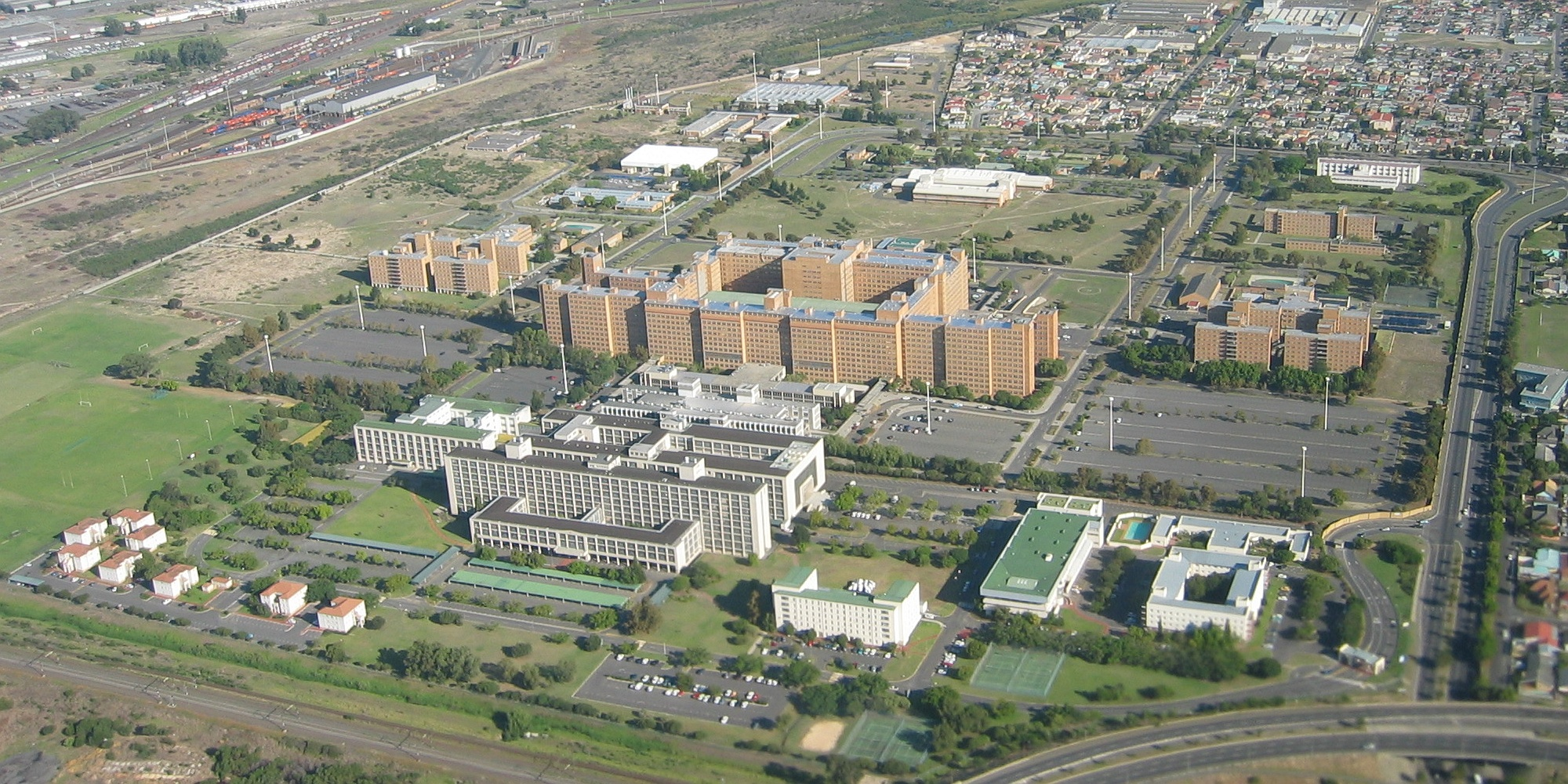
- Tygerberg hospital and campus

- Shown in Cape Town

Geography
- Location: Parow, Cape Town, Western Cape, South Africa
- Coordinates: 33.911°S 18.610°E

Organisation
- Care system: Department of Health
- Type: Teaching, District General
- Affiliated university: Stellenbosch University

Services
- Emergency department: Yes, Major Trauma Centre
- Beds: 1384

History
- Founded: 1976

Links
- Website: www.westerncape.gov.za/your_gov/153
- Lists: Hospitals in South Africa

Tygerberg Hospital is a tertiary public hospital located in Parow. The hospital was officially opened in 1976 and is the largest district general hospital in the Western Cape and the second largest hospital in South Africa, with the capacity for 1899 beds. It acts as a teaching hospital in conjunction with the Stellenbosch University's Health Science Faculty.

To become a patient at Tygerberg, a person must be referred by a primary or secondary health care facility. Over 3.6 million people receive health care from Tygerberg, either directly or via its secondary hospitals, such as Paarl and Worcester Hospital. During the normal working day there are about 10,000 people on hospital grounds.

== Services ==
A full range of general specialist and sub specialist services include:

- Carel du Toit Centre for the Hearing Impaired
- Centre for Mental Health
- Clinical Nutrition and Vitaminology Service
- Clinical Retinal Laboratory
- Cochlear Implant Unit
- Complex Craniofacial Surgery Unit
- Department of Endocrinology & Metabolism
- Complex Radiation and Oncological Therapy
- Day Surgery Unit
- HospiVision NPO
- In-vitro Fertilisation
- Kidney Transplant Unit
- Laboratory for Human Genetics
- Neonatal Intensive Care Unit
- Neuropsychiatry Unit
- Open Heart Surgery Unit
- Perinatal Mortality Unit
- Poison Information Centre
- Postnatal Stress Disorder Unit
- Specialised Pulmonary Function Laboratory
- Tuberculosis Clinical Work Unit
- TygerBear Unit – Social Work Unit
- Vascular Surgery
- Hepatobiliary Surgery
- MRI with FMRI facility and additional a 3rd MRI machine
- Oncology
- Only Adult Burns Unit in the Western Cape
- Hyperbaric Oxygen facility
- 26 bed Private Ward

These services provide for advanced health care to all patients, as well as training of large numbers of doctors (under- and post-graduate) and all other types of clinical staff.

== Coat of arms ==
The hospital registered a coat of arms at the Bureau of Heraldry in 1974 : Gules, on a mount Vert, a leopard statant erect Or, armed and langued Azure, supporting with the forepaws a Staff of Aesculapius erect Or; on a chief Argent, an antique lamp Azure enflamed Gules. The arms were designed by Sheila Fort.
