= Timeline of Cape Town =

Chronological listing of notable events

The following is a timeline of the history of Cape Town in the Western Cape province of South Africa.

== Prior to 19th century ==
- 1510 – A Portuguese force led by Francisco de Almeida is defeated in the Battle of Salt River by the indigenous Goringhaiqua Khoikhoi clan.
- 1647 – The ship Nieuwe Haerlem is wrecked near what is today Bloubergstrand. This shipwreck ultimately leads to the establishment of a colony.
- 1648 – Fort Zandenburgh built by the stranded sailors of the Nieuwe Haerlem.
- 1651 – Jan van Riebeeck visits the Cape as part of a rescue mission to save stranded sailors.
- 1652
  - 6 April: Jan van Riebeeck of the Dutch East India Company arrives.
  - Fort de Goede Hoop built.
- 1653 – Arrival of the first slave, Abraham van Batavia.
- 1654 – Redoubt Duijnhoop built.
- 1658 – Conflict between the Khoi and settlers.
- 1679
  - Castle of Good Hope completed.
  - Simon van der Stel becomes commander of Dutch colony.
- 1680 Eversdal started as a farm
- 1682 British East Indiaman Johanna wrecked off Cape Agulhas and salvaged by VOC officials returning 104 survivors to Cape Town
- 1688 – French Huguenot immigrants begin arriving.
- 1699
  - Dutch Reformed church built.
  - Parade Ground laid out.
- 1705 Stellenberg today in Bellville land was awarded
- 1714 Kenridge then known as Blommesteijn started. It is now part of Bellville
- 1725 – Chavonnes Battery built.

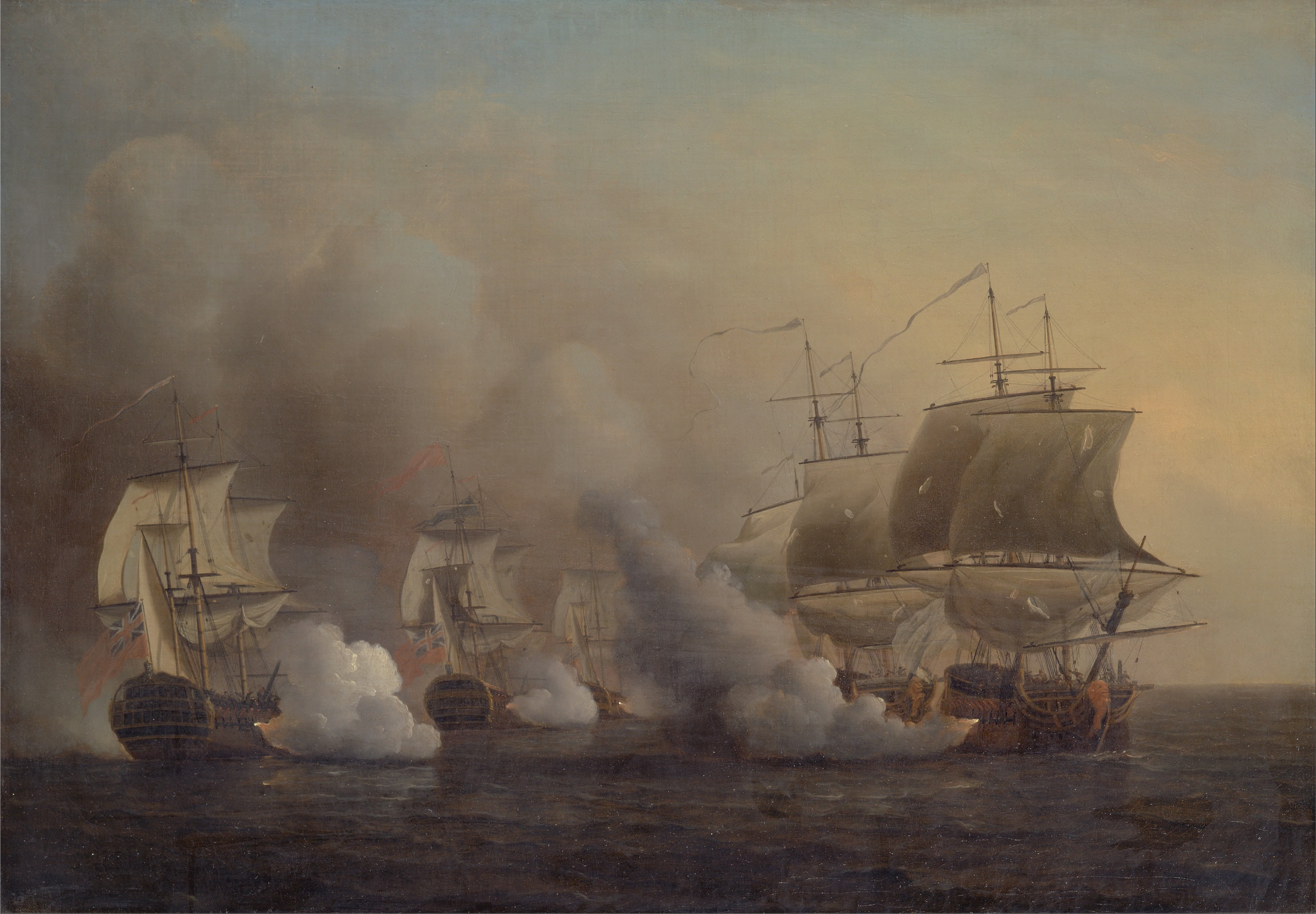
A 1757 naval action off of the Cape of Good Hope between 3 British and 2 unidentified vessels.

- 1757 - During the Seven Years' War a naval action takes place off the Cape of Good Hope between British and unidentified (likely French) vessels.
- 1761 – Dessinian Library established.
- 1772
  - Freemasonry in South Africa started
  - Hospital founded.
- 1780 – Lutheran Church built.
- 1786 – Committee of the High Court established.
- 1787 – Württemberg Cape Regiment in residence.
- 1790 – Castle of Good Hope rebuilt.
- 1792 The Lutheran Church in Strand Street was built
- 1795
  - British in power in Cape Colony.
  - Johann Christian Ritter sets up printing press.
- 1798
  - Great fire of 1798 (Cape Town)
  - Auwal Mosque built.

== 19th century ==
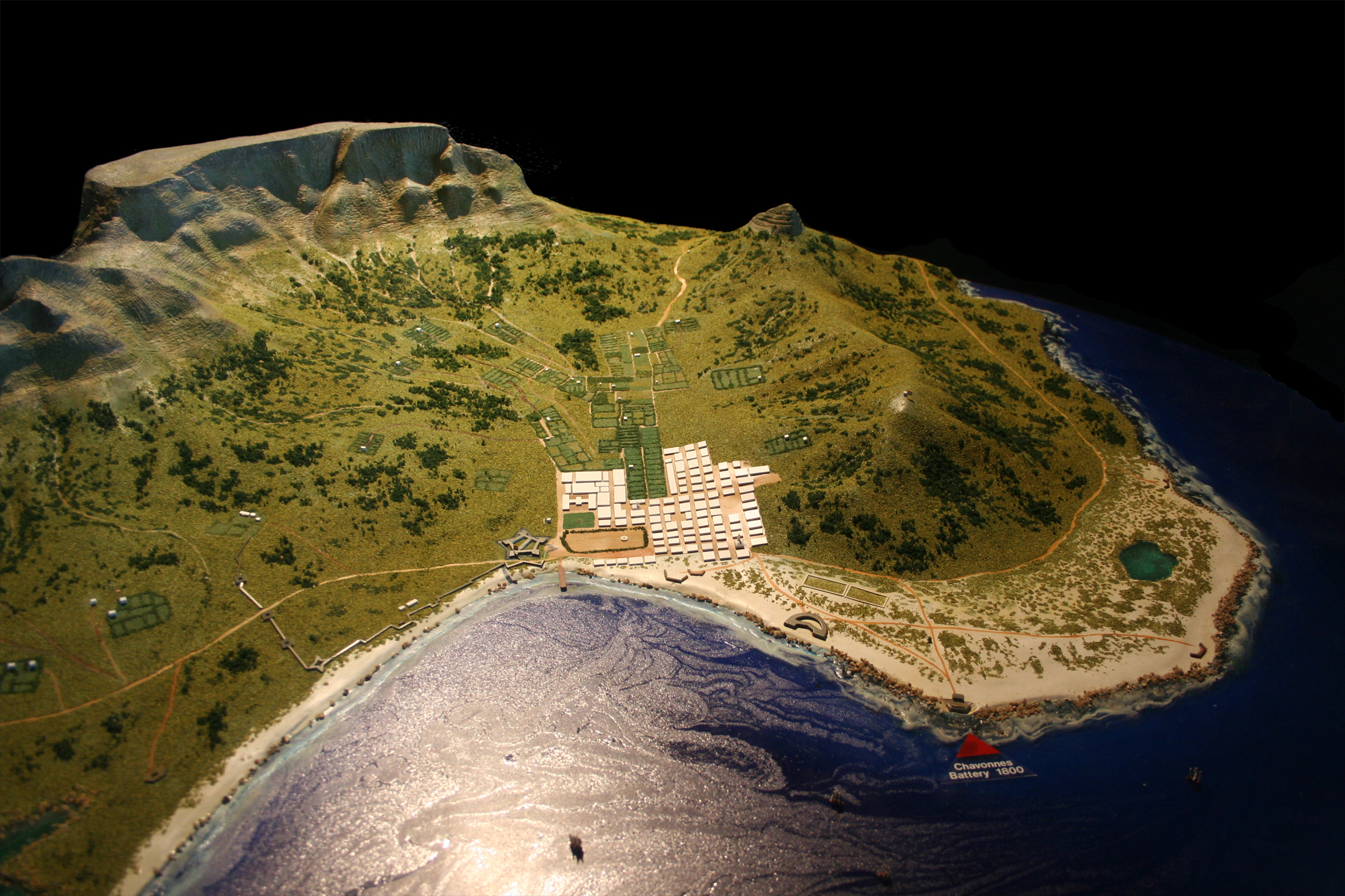
A diorama of Cape Town was it would have appeared in 1800.

- 1802 – Freemason's Lodge built on Bouquet Street.
- 1803 – Dutch regain power in Cape Colony by the Treaty of Amiens.
- 1804 – Coat of arms of Cape Town in use.
- 1806
  - 8–18 January: Battle of Blaauwberg - British victory over the Batavian Republic during the Napoleonic Wars.
    - British in power in Cape Colony again.
  - Noon Gun firing begins.
- 1807
  - Palm Tree Mosque congregation formed.
  - Slave Trade Act passed.
- 1808
  - Perseverance Tavern founded.
  - First Slave Revolt.
- 1814 – Cape Town ceded to Britain by the Anglo–Dutch Treaty of 1814.
- 1819
  - Commercial Exchange founded.
  - Howell's bookshop in business.
- 1820 – Royal Observatory founded.
- 1821
  - South African Public Library founded.
  - Flagstaff erected on Lion's Rump hill.
- 1823 – Population: 15,500.
- 1824
  - Green Point Lighthouse built.
  - The South African Commercial Advertiser newspaper begins publication.
  - South African Literary Society founded.
- 1825 – South African Museum founded.
- 1827
  - Colonist newspaper begins publication.
  - Hoërskool Durbanville was founded.
- 1829
  - Vagrancy and pass laws of 1809 repealed.
  - South African College Schools was founded.
- 1830 – Cape of Good Hope Literary Gazette begins publication.
- 1831 – De Zuid-Afrikaan newspaper begins publication.
- 1834
  - Slaves freed in British Empire.
  - St. George's Church built.
  - Popular Library established.
- 1839 – Cape Town Municipality established.
- 1840 Michiel van Breda became first mayor
- 1841
  - Cape Town Mail newspaper begins publication.
  - Wynberg Boys' High School was founded.
- 1844
  - Maclear's Beacon was created
  - Nurul Islam Mosque founded.
  - Wynberg High School for Girls was founded.
- 1845 – Mutual Life Assurance Society of the Cape of Good Hope established.
- 1846
  - Gaslight introduced.
  - South African Mining Company founded.
- 1847 – Anglican Diocese of Cape Town established.
- 1848
  - Hercules Crosse Jarvis becomes mayor.
  - Botanic Garden established.
  - St. George's Grammar School was founded.

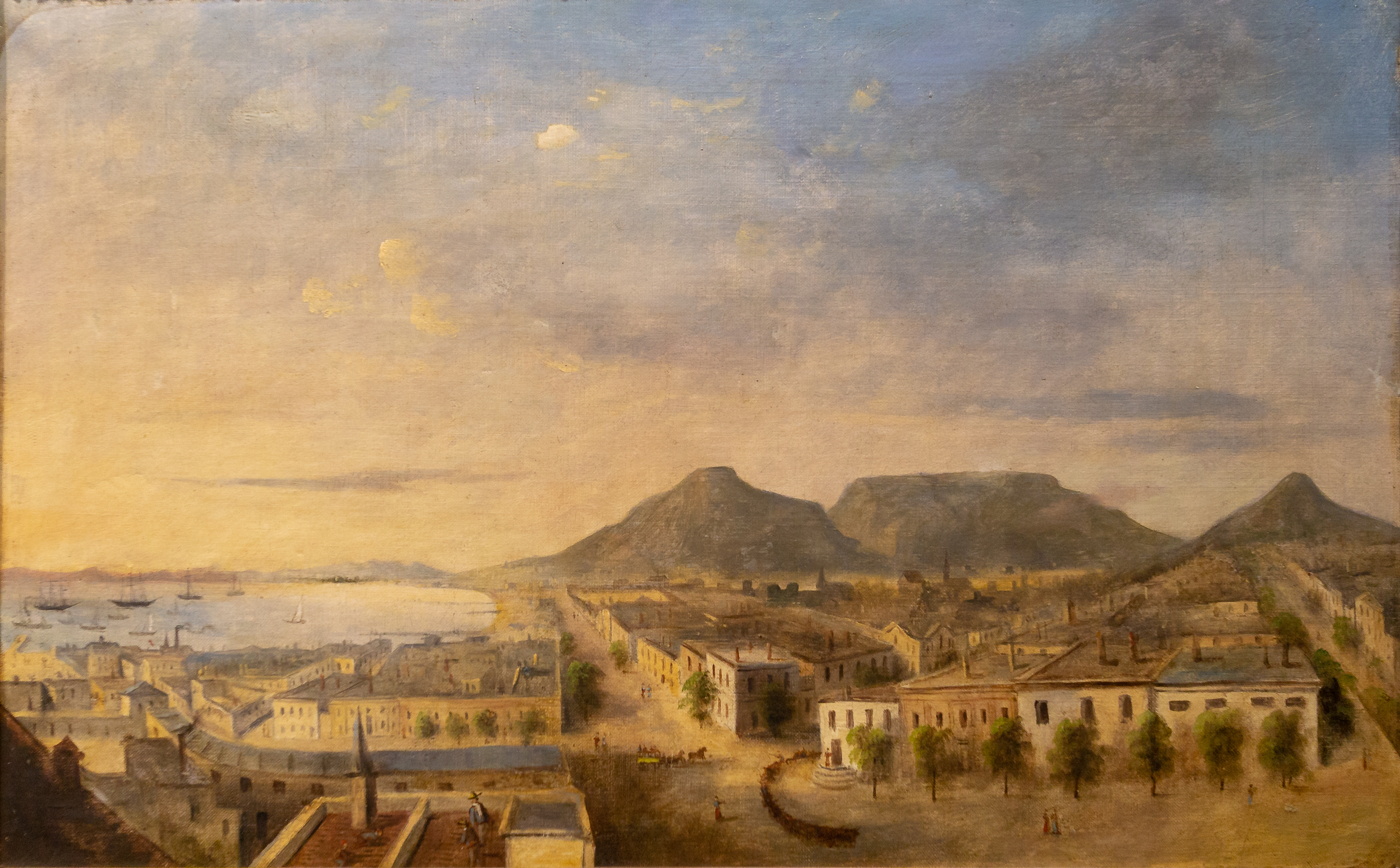
Panoramic view of Cape Town from the roof of the Lutheran Church, Strand Street in 1849.

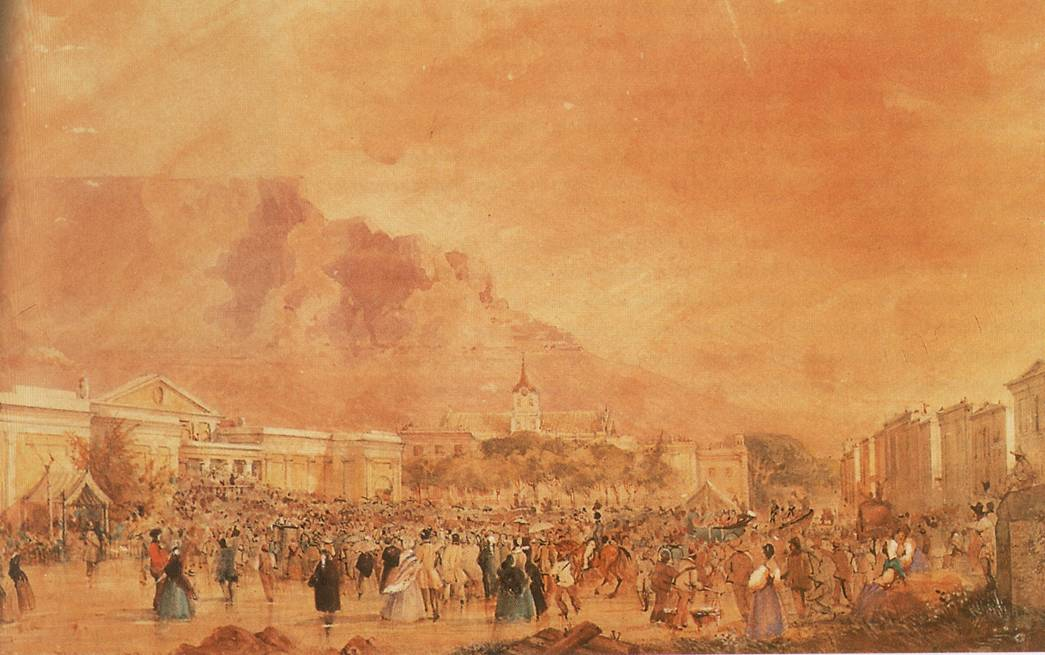
Crowds gather to hear speeches on the Convict Crisis during the 1849 anti-convict demonstrations.

- 1849 –
  - Anti-convict demonstrations.
  - Bishops Diocesan College was founded.
- 1851 – South African Fine Arts Association organizes exhibition in the Company's Garden.
- 1853 – Anti-Mormon riots.
- 1854
  - First establishment of the Parliament of the Cape of Good Hope
  - Bookseller Jan Carel Juta in business.
- 1857 – Cape Argus newspaper and Cape Monthly Magazine begin publication.
- 1858 – Smallpox outbreak.
- 1859 – Prison built.
- 1860
  - Wellington-Cape Town railway begins operating.
  - Harbor works begun.
  - Public Library building constructed.
  - Telegraph begins operating (Simon's Town – Cape Town).
  - Cape Town High School was founded.
- 1861
  - Bellvile was founded
  - first Railway station built.
- 1863
  - Horsecar trams begin operating.
  - Grey Library opens.
- 1864 – Somerset Hospital opens.
- 1867 – District Six formed.
- 1868 – Population: 22,543.
- 1870 – Alfred Basin constructed.
- 1871 – South African Art Gallery founded.
- 1872
  - The Cape attains responsible government, led by its first Prime Minister John Molteno
  - Cape Government Railways founded.
- 1873
  - Founding of the University of the Cape of Good Hope, later UNISA
  - First official use of Dutch in the Cape Parliament.
- 1874
  - Founding in Cape Town of the South African Teachers' Association.
  - Founding of the Cape Government Railways
  - The "Molteno Regulations", drawn up in Cape Town, establish the South African public library system.
- 1875.
  - Population: 33,000.
  - The Cape's first water engineer, John Gamble, appointed by the Cape Government and begins work on Cape Town's water infrastructure.
  - The Cape Town railway station built.
  - Opening of Cape Western railway line (11 May 1875), Cape Town Docks to junction with mainline, 7 miles 1 chain (11.3 kilometres).
- 1876
  - Cape Times newspaper begins publication.
  - Villagers Cricket Club is founded.
  - Opening of the Cape Town to Worcester railway line (16 June 1876)
  - The 2,700 ton steamer, Windsor Castle, sinks off Dassen Island, north of Table Bay (19 October 1876)
  - South Africa's first official archives established by Cape Government in Cape Town.
- 1877
  - First South African International Exhibition is held in Cape Town.
  - Cape Council of Education is established.
- 1878
  - Railway station enlarged.
  - The first telephones are set up in the Cape.
- 1879 – Wesleyan Methodist Church built.
- 1880 – School of Art established.
- 1881 – Opening of the Molteno Dam in Oranjezicht
- 1884
  - Opening of the new Cape Parliament building
  - Sea Point High School was founded.
- 1885 – Standard Bank of South Africa headquarters relocates to Cape Town.
- 1886 – Houses of Parliament built.
- 1887 – Kaapse Klopse minstrel festival begins.
- 1889 – Newlands Cricket Ground in use.
- 1890 – Newlands Rugby Stadium was opened.
- 1891
  - Valkenberg Hospital and Mountain Club founded.
  - Population: 51,251.
- 1892 – The Franchise and Ballot Act of Cecil Rhodes places restrictions on the multiracial Cape Qualified Franchise
- 1894
  - Owl Club formed.
  - Rustenburg High School for Girls was founded.
- 1896 – Electric trams begin operating (approximate date).
- 1897
  - Woodhead Dam constructed.
  - Museum and General Post & Telegraph Offices open.
  - Rondebosch Boys' High School was founded.
- 1898 – Jewish Tailors Union organized.
- 1899 – Mount Nelson Hotel in business.
- 1900
  - Boston was founded by Americans
  - St. James Church built.

== 20th century ==
Historical population
Year	Pop.	±% p.a.
1658	360	—
1731	3,157	+3.02%
1836	20,000	+1.77%
1875	45,000	+2.10%
1891	67,000	+2.52%
1901	171,000	+9.82%
1950	618,000	+2.66%
1955	705,000	+2.67%
1960	803,000	+2.64%
1965	945,000	+3.31%
1970	1,114,000	+3.35%
1975	1,339,000	+3.75%
1980	1,609,000	+3.74%
1985	1,933,000	+3.74%
1990	2,296,000	+3.50%
1996	2,565,018	+1.86%
2001	2,892,243	+2.43%
2007	3,497,097	+3.22%
2011	3,740,025	+1.69%
2014	3,750,000	+0.09%
Note: Census figures (1996–2011) cover figures after 1994 reflect the greater Cape Town metropolitan municipality reflecting post-1994 reforms. Sources: 1658–1904, 1950-1990, 1996, 2001, and 2011 Census; 2007, 2014 Census estimates.

=== 1900s–1940s ===
- 1901 – St. George's Cathedral, Cape Town foundations laid.
- 1902
  - African Political Organization founded.
  - Southern Africa Association for the Advancement of Science headquartered in Cape Town.
- 1904
  - Tivoli music hall opens.
  - Population: 77,668.
- 1905 – Cape Town City Hall and Synagogue built.
- 1906 – Cape University buildings begun.
- 1910
  - Cape Town in Cape Province becomes capital of Union of South Africa.
  - Groote Schuur becomes official Cape residence of Prime Ministers of South Africa.
- 1912
  - Rhodes Memorial dedicated on Devil's Peak.
  - Trafalgar High School was founded.
- 1913 – Botanical Society organized.
- 1914
  - Cape Philharmonic Orchestra active.
  - Koopmans-de Wet House museum opens.
- 1915 – Die Burger newspaper begins publication.
- 1916 – Steenbras Dam, tunnel through the Hottentots Holland mountains and a 64 kilometre long cast iron pipeline to supply Cape Town with water.
- 1918
  - University of Cape Town active.
  - Langa (suburb) established.
- 1919 – Industrial and Commercial Workers' Union founded.
- 1922
  - Pinelands (suburb) South Africa's first Garden City established and the first house built at 3 Mead Way.
  - Herschel Girls' School was founded.
- 1926 – Hoërskool Jan van Riebeeck was founded.
- 1928 – Table Mountain Aerial Cableway begins operating.
- 1930
  - The clay quarry and jail opened in Belville
  - South African National Gallery building opens.
- 1934 – UCT Ballet Company established.
- 1935
  - Christmas fire of 1935
  - Trolleybuses begin operating.
  - Windsor High School was founded.
- 1936 – St. George's Cathedral and Table Bay power station constructed.
- 1937 – Hoërskool Bellville was founded.
- 1937 - Just Nuisance born in Rondebosch (the world's first and only dog enlisted as Able Seaman in the South African Navy)
- 1938 – Groote Schuur Hospital founded.
- 1939 – Catholic Vicariate of Cape Town active.
- 1940 – Mutual Building constructed.
- 1942 – Varsity student newspaper begins publication.
- 1944 Just Nuisance the world's only canine Able Seaman in a Navy dies and is buried with full military honors in Simon's Town, aged 7.
- 1945
  - Duncan Dock constructed.
  - Standpunte literary magazine begins publication.
- 1946
  - Wingfield Aerodrome active (approximate date).
  - Publisher Balkema in business.
  - Population: 383,891 city; 470,930 urban agglomeration.
- 1948 – Nyanga (suburb) established.

=== 1950s–1980s ===
- 1950s – Cape Flats populated per race-based legislation.
- 1950 – Maynardville Open-Air Theatre founded (1 December 1950), by the Athlone Committee for Nursery Education.
- 1951
  - Population: 441,209 city; 577,648 urban agglomeration.
  - Hoërskool D.F. Malan was founded.
  - Harold Cressy High School was founded.
- 1952
  - Athlone Teachers' Training College founded (February 1952), South Africa's first college for coloured teachers of pre-school children, using money raised from the Maynardville Theatre's performances.
  - Pinelands High School was founded.
- 1953
  - Coloured People's Organisation active.
  - Westerford High School was founded.
- 1954
  - D.F. Malan Airport opens.
  - Hoërskool Tygerberg was founded.
  - J.G. Meiring High School was founded.
- 1956
  - Karl Bremer Hospital opened its doors
  - Red Cross War Memorial Children's Hospital opens.
  - Maynardville Open-Air Theatre holds its first Shakespeare performance (29 January 1956), circa five years after its founding.
  - Clarke's Bookshop in business.
  - Africa South magazine begins publication.
- 1958 – Gugulethu (suburb) established.
- 1959
  - Milnerton High School was founded.
  - Groote Schuur High School was founded.
- 1960
  - Sentinel News and Contrast magazine begin publication.
  - University College of the Western Cape opens.
  - Milnerton Lighthouse commissioned.
  - Hoërskool Eben Dönges was founded.
- 1961
  - City becomes part of the Republic of South Africa.
  - Cape Town railway station rebuilt.
  - Gardens Commercial High School was founded.
  - Oude Molen Technical High School was founded.
  - Sans Souci High School for Girls was founded.
- 1962
  - Athlone Power Station commissioned.
  - Naspers Centre built.
- 1964
  - Rivonia Trialists imprisoned to life sentence in Robben Island.
  - Pollsmoor Prison established.
  - Robert Selby Taylor becomes archbishop of the Anglican Diocese of Cape Town.
  - Little Rivonia Trialists imprisoned to different sentences in Robben Island.
- 1965 – The Settlers High School was founded.
- 1966 – Prime Minister of South Africa Hendrik Verwoerd is assassinated by Dimitri Tsafendas in the House of Assembly.
- 1967 – Cape Town Philharmonia Choir founded.
- 1968
  - Non-whites banned from District Six and houses demolished per race-based legislation.
  - Centre for Conflict Resolution headquartered in Cape Town.
- 1970 – Population: 691,296 city; 1,096,597 urban agglomeration.
- 1971
  - Nico Malan Theatre Center opens.
  - Bosmansdam High School was founded.
- 1972
  - Student protest; crackdown.
  - Athlone Stadium and 1 Thibault Square built.
  - Waterworks Museum and Space Theatre founded.
- 1976
  - Hoërskool Brackenfell was founded.
  - 16. June 1976 Soweto Massacre
  - August: Racial unrest.
  - Mac Maharaj was released from custody of Apartheid government after serving 12 years in the Robben Island prison.
  - UCT Radio begins broadcasting.
  - Good Hope Centre built.
- 1977 – Fairmont High School was founded.
- 1978
  - Cape Argus Cycle Race begins.
  - Cape Town Civic Centre built.
- 1979
  - Hout Bay Museum opens.
  - Steenbras Dam, Steenbras Dam – Upper, pumped storage scheme was opened to supplement Cape Towns electricity supply during periods of peak demand.
- 1982 – Laloo Chiba was released from custody of Apartheid government after serving 18 years in the Robben Island prison but he was rearrested in 1985 to 1986 without a trial.
- 1985 – Population: 776,617 city; 1,911,521 urban agglomeration.
- 1986
  - 3 March: The assassination of The Gugulethu Seven anti-apartheid group.
  - Desmond Tutu becomes archbishop of the Anglican Diocese of Cape Town.
  - Hoërskool Stellenberg was founded.
  - Table View High School was founded.
- 1987
  - Table Talk newspaper begins publication.
  - 5 November: Govan Mbeki is released from custody after serving 24 years in the Robben Island prison.
- 1989
  - 2 September: Purple Rain Protest.
  - 13 September: Cape Town peace march.
  - 15 October: Ahmed Kathrada, Jafta Masemola, Raymond Mhlaba, Wilton Mkwayi, Andrew Mlangeni, Elias Motsoaledi, Oscar Mpetha and Walter Sisulu were released from custody of Apartheid government after some spending more than two decades in prison of Robben Island and Pollsmoor Prison.
  - Monument Park High School was founded.
  - Parklands College was founded.

=== 1990s ===
- 1990
  - 3 February: Peace Ritual begins.
  - 11 February: Nelson Mandela gives public speech after his release from prison.
  - Women's Centre organized.
  - Club Eden opens.
- 1991 – Population: 854,616 city; 2,350,157 metro.
- 1993
  - 25 July: Saint James Church massacre occurs in Kenilworth.
  - 30 December: Heidelberg Tavern massacre occurs in Observatory.
  - Metlife Centre built.
- 1994
  - 27 April: South African general election held.
  - District Six Museum opens.
  - Cape Town becomes part of the new Western Cape province.
- 1995
  - MFM 92.6 and Voice of the Cape radio begin broadcasting.
  - Two Oceans Aquarium opens.
  - 1995 Rugby World Cup held.
- 1996
  - Cape Town/Central, Tygerberg, South Peninsula, Blaauwberg, Oostenberg, and Helderberg municipalities created.
  - Gallery Mau Mau active.
  - Flag of Cape Town redesign adopted.
  - Population: 987,007.
- 1997 – Cape Talk radio begins broadcasting.
- 1998
  - Table Mountain National Park established.
  - Planet Hollywood restaurant bombing results in 2 deaths and 26 injuries.
- 1999
  - Surfing competition begins.
  - National Library of South Africa, Cape Town Opera, and Ajax Cape Town football team established.
- 2000
  - City of Cape Town metropolitan municipality formed by merger of Cape Town/Central, Tygerberg, South Peninsula, Blaauwberg, Oostenberg, and Helderberg.
  - Cape Town CCID and Western Cape Anti-Eviction Campaign organized.
  - MTN Sciencentre and Canal Walk shopping centre open.
  - Homegrown (drum and bass event) begins.
  - Institute for Justice and Reconciliation established.
  - Table Mountain fire (2000)

== 21st century ==
- 2001
  - Cape Town Pride parade begins.
  - Baphumelele Children's Home founded.
  - Website Capetown.gov.za launched (approximate date).
  - Gold Museum opens.
  - Population: 827,218.
- 2002
  - Northlink College was established.
- 2003
  - Mayoral Committee of the City of Cape Town active.
  - Die Son newspaper begins publication.
  - Cape Town International Convention Centre and Mzoli's open.
  - 2003 Cricket World Cup held.
  - Sizzlers massacre results in 9 deaths
- 2004
  - Africa Centre established.
- 2005
  - Cape Peninsula University of Technology and Cape Cobras cricket team established.
  - Daily Voice newspaper begins publication.
- 2006
  - Cape Town Book Fair begins.
  - Homeless World Cup football contest held.
  - Neighbourgoods Market in business in Woodstock.
  - Table Mountain fire (2006)
- 2007
  - September: International meeting of educators produces Open Education Declaration.
  - University of Cape Town's African Centre for Cities active (approximate date).
  - Isango Ensemble theatre group active.
- 2008
  - Cape Town TV and Hillsong Church established.
  - Chavonnes Battery museum opens.
  - Spier Poetry Exchange (festival) and Infecting the City (arts festival) begin.
- 2009
  - Cape Town Stadium opens.
  - Dan Plato becomes mayor.
  - Silicon Cape Initiative founded.
  - Organised Chaos LAN Party begins (approximate date).
  - Table Mountain fire (2009)
- 2010
  - June–July: FIFA World Cup held.
  - Chippa United Football Club formed.
- 2011
  - MyCiTi bus begins operating.
  - Patricia de Lille becomes mayor.
  - Population: 433,688.
- 2014
  - Khayelitsha Commission publishes its findings & recommendations on policing shortfalls in Khayelitsha
- 2015 – 2018: Cape Town water crisis
- 2015
  - Protea Heights Academy was founded.
  - 2015 Western Cape fire season
- 2016
  - Cape Town City F.C. was formed.
- 2017
  - September: Zeitz Museum of Contemporary Art Africa to open.
- 2018
  - July: International Wikimania meeting to be held in Cape Town.
  - August: Mayor Patricia de Lille announces her intention to resign as Mayor in October.
  - October: De Lille resigns as Mayor on 31 October, and Deputy Mayor Ian Neilson becomes Acting Mayor
  - November: Former Mayor Dan Plato is elected and sworn in as Mayor on 6 November
- 2019
  - Greenmarket Square refugee sit-in
- 2020
  - Khayelitsha tavern shooting results in 7 deaths
  - Gugulethu massacre results in 8 deaths
- 2021
  - 2021 Table Mountain fire
  - 2021 Cape Town taxi conflict results in 81 deaths
  - November: Geordin Hill-Lewis is sworn in as Cape Town's new Mayor
- 2022
  - 2022 Parliament of South Africa fire
  - A heatwave hits Cape Town and breaks the cities records.
- 2023
  - The 2023 Cape Town taxi strike results in 5 deaths
- 2024
  - The City of Cape Town announces a R120 billion, 10-year infrastructure project, including affordable housing, public transport expansion, climate change resilience initiatives, job creation, and independent energy production
  - Cape Town has its busiest tourist season on record.
- 2025
  - The City enacts its Cape Town Biodiversity Spatial Plan (CTBSP) 2025, a biodiversity policy aimed at guiding development in the city, and ensuring environmental sustainability.
  - Cape Town is named the named the best city in the world by Time Out, and is voted the world's top city for travel for the 8th consecutive year, by The Telegraph.

== See also ==
- History of Cape Town
- List of mayors of Cape Town
- List of Cape Town suburbs
- Fortifications of the Cape Peninsula
- Dutch Cape Colony
- History of the Cape Colony before 1806
- History of the Cape Colony from 1806 to 1870
- History of the Cape Colony from 1870 to 1899
- History of the Cape Colony from 1899 to 1910
- Timelines of other cities in South Africa: Durban, Gqeberha, Johannesburg, Pietermaritzburg, Pretoria

== Bibliography ==
=== Published in 19th century ===
- Robert Semple (1805), "Cape Town", Walks and sketches at the Cape of Good Hope to which is subjoined a journey from Cape Town to Blettenberg's Bay (2nd ed.), London: Printed by and for C. and R. Baldwin
- Josiah Conder (1830), "Cape Town", The Modern Traveller, London: J.Duncan
- "British Colonies: Cape Town". The Mirror of Literature, Amusement, and Instruction (716–717). London: J. Limbird. April–May 1835.
- J. Thomas; T. Baldwin, eds. (1868), "Cape Town", Lippincott's Pronouncing Gazetteer (2nd ed.), Philadelphia: J.B. Lippincott & Co.
- John Noble, ed. (1886). "Cities and Towns of the Colony". Official Handbook: History, Productions and Resources of the Cape of Good Hope. Cape Town: Saul Solomon & Co. for the Colonial & Indian Exhibition Committee. "Cape Town"

=== Published in 20th century ===
- A. Samler Brown; G. Gordon Brown, eds. (1906), "Cape Town and Suburbs", Guide to South Africa (14th ed.), London: Sampson, Low, Marston & Co.
- "Cape Town" . Encyclopædia Britannica. Vol. 5 (11th ed.). 1911. pp. 252–253.
- "Cape Town", Official South African Municipal Year Book, Cape Town: Francis G. Pay, 1914, hdl:2027/mdp.39015073264619
- Dorothea Fairbridge (1922), "Old Cape Town", Historic houses of South Africa, London: H. Milford, Oxford University Press, OCLC 2777566
- "Cape Town" . Encyclopædia Britannica. Vol. 30 (12th ed.). 1922. pp. 564–565.
- John Western (1981). Outcast Cape Town. University of California Press. ISBN 978-0-520-20737-0.
- Evangelos A. Mantzaris (1987). "Jewish Trade Unions in Cape Town, South Africa, 1903-1907: A Socio-Historical Study". Jewish Social Studies. 49 (3/4): 251–264. JSTOR 4467388.
- Nigel Worden (Spring 1994). "Unwrapping History at the Cape Town Waterfront". Public Historian. 16.
- Noelle Watson, ed. (1996). "Cape Town". International Dictionary of Historic Places: Middle East and Africa. UK: Routledge. pp. 165–170. ISBN 1-884964-03-6.
- Kirsten McKenzie (1998). "Franklins of the Cape: the South African Commercial Advertiser and the Creation of a Colonial Public Sphere, 1824–1854". Kronos (25).
- Grant Saff (1998). Changing Cape Town: Urban Dynamics, Policy, and Planning During the Political Transition in South Africa. University Press of America. ISBN 978-0-7618-1199-2.
- Nigel Worden; Elizabeth Van Heyningen; Vivian Bickford-Smith (1998), Cape Town: the Making of a City, Claremont, South Africa: D. Philip, ISBN 0-86486-435-3
- Vivian Bickford-Smith; Elizabeth Van Heyningen; Nigel Worden (1999), Cape Town in the twentieth century, Claremont, South Africa: D. Philip Publishers, ISBN 0-86486-384-5

=== Published in 21st century ===
- Vivian Bickford-Smith (2003). Ethnic Pride and Racial Prejudice in Victorian Cape Town. Cambridge University Press. ISBN 978-0-521-52639-5.
- Christoph Haferburg; Jürgen Ossenbrügge, eds. (2003). Ambiguous Restructurings of Post-apartheid Cape Town: The Spatial Form of Socio-political Change. Lit Verlag. ISBN 978-3-8258-6699-0.
- Paul Tiyambe Zeleza; Dickson Eyoh, eds. (2003). "Cape Town, South Africa". Encyclopedia of Twentieth-Century African History. Routledge. ISBN 0-415-23479-4.
- Richard Marback (2004). "A Tale of Two Plaques: Rhetoric in Cape Town". Rhetoric Review. 23 (3): 253–268. doi:10.1207/s15327981rr2303_4. JSTOR 20176621. S2CID 143466012.
- Kevin Shillington, ed. (2004). "Cape Town". Encyclopedia of African History. Routledge. p. 215. ISBN 978-1-135-45670-2.
- Kwame Anthony Appiah and Henry Louis Gates, ed. (2005). "Cape Town". Africana: The Encyclopedia of the African and African American Experience (2nd ed.). Oxford University Press. p. 732. ISBN 978-0-19-517055-9.
- S.B. Bekker; Anne Leildé, eds. (2006). Reflections on Identity in Four African Cities. South Africa: African Minds. ISBN 978-1-920051-40-2. (about Cape Town, Johannesburg, Libreville, Lomé)
- Catherine Besteman (2008). Transforming Cape Town. University of California Press. ISBN 978-0-520-94264-6.
- Tony Roshan Samara (2011). Cape Town After Apartheid: Crime and Governance in the Divided City. U of Minnesota Press. ISBN 978-0-8166-7000-0.
- Ciraj Rassool; Virgil Slade (2013). "'Fields of Play': the District Six Museum and the History of Football in Cape Town". In Susann Baller; et al. (eds.). Global Perspectives on Football in Africa: Visualising the Game. Sport in the Global Society. Routledge. p. 50. ISBN 978-1-317-96587-9.
- Crime Networks and Governance in Cape Town, Pretoria: Institute for Security Studies, 2014 – via International Relations and Security Network
