= List of town tramway systems in Africa =

This is a list of African cities and towns that have, or once had, town tramway (urban tramway, or streetcar) systems as part of their public transport system.

== Algeria ==
Location	Name of System	Traction Type	Date (From)	Date (To)	Notes
el-Jazair ولاية الجزائر /Algiers		Steam	12 Sep 1894	1935	
el-Jazair ولاية الجزائر /Algiers		Electric	14 Apr 1898	3 Sep 1959	
el-Jazair ولاية الجزائر /Algiers	Algiers tramway	Electric	8 May 2011		
Annaba عنّابة		Steam	?	?	
Qacentina قسنطينة /Constantine	Constantine tramway	Electric	4 July 2013		
Biskra بسكرة		Horse	?	?	
Sidi Bel Abbès سيدي بلعباس	Sidi Bel Abbès tramway	Electric	26 Jul 2017		
Blida البليدة		Steam	?	?	
Miliana مليانة		Steam	?	?	
Mestghanem مستغانم /Mostaganem	Mostaganem Tramway	Electric	18 Feb 2023		
Wahrān وهران /Oran		Steam	?	?	
Wahrān وهران /Oran		Electric	1898	1950	
Wahrān وهران /Oran	Oran tramway	Electric	1 May 2013		
Ouargla ورقلة		Horse	1911	1941	Narrow gauge. From Ksar to Bordj Lutaud, around 1500 metres.
Ouargla ورقلة	Ouargla tramway	Electric	20 Mar 2018		
Sétif سطيف		Horse	?	?	
Sétif سطيف	Sétif tramway	Electric	8 May 2018		
Touggourt تقرت		Horse	?	?	

== Democratic Republic of the Congo ==
Location	Name of System	Traction Type	Date (From)	Date (To)	Notes
Boma		Steam	4 Mar 1890	ca. 1900	

== Egypt ==
Location	Name of System	Traction Type	Date (From)	Date (To)	Notes
el-Iskandariya الإسكندرية /Alexandria – Urban system	Alexandria Tram	Horse	1860	1902?	
el-Iskandariya الإسكندرية /Alexandria – Urban system	Alexandria Tram	Electric	1902		
♦ Ramleh (suburban) system	Alexandria Tram	Horse	1869	?	
♦ Ramleh (suburban) system	Alexandria Tram	Steam	?	?	
♦ Ramleh (suburban) system	Alexandria Tram	Electric	Dec 1903		
el-Qāhirah القاهرة /Cairo	Trams in Greater Cairo	Electric	12 Aug 1896	ca. 2015	In autumn 2015 the operation very short path length of about 3 km, which was supposed to close at the end of that year. It was finally closed in 2019. Metre gauge See Transport in Cairo
♦ Miṣr el-ǧidīdah مصر الجديدة /Heliopolis	Trams in Greater Cairo	Electric	9 May 1908	July 2018	Cairo system extended to serve Heliopolis in 1908. Express tramway between Cairo main station and Heliopolis opened 11 Jul 1910.
Hulwan /Helwan		Electric	19 Feb 1981	ca. 2011	Metre gauge; Ceased operation in the aftermath of the 2011 Egyptian Revolution. By the end of 2015, trams were finally removed from the depot, located in Arab al-Fawarsa.
Būr Saʻīd بور سعيد /Port Said		Horse	22 Sep 1900	1932	Metre gauge

== Eritrea ==
Location	Name of System	Traction Type	Date (From)	Date (To)	Notes
Massawa		Steam	?	?	

== Ethiopia ==
Location	Name of System	Traction Type	Date (From)	Date (To)	Notes
Addis Ababa	Addis Ababa Light Rail	Electric	20 September 2015		

== Ghana ==
Location	Name of System	Traction Type	Date (From)	Date (To)	Notes
Accra		Steam	1906	1941	

== Kenya ==
Location	Name of System	Traction Type	Date (From)	Date (To)	Notes
Mombasa		human	1890s	1921	In Mombasa's Fort Jesus you can find a historic car

== Libya ==
Location	Name of System	Traction Type	Date (From)	Date (To)	Notes
Banġāzī بنغازي /Benghazi		Horse	?	?	

== Madagascar ==
Location	Name of System	Traction Type	Date (From)	Date (To)	Notes
Antananarivo		(Steam)			Construction started after 1921, not completed.
Toamasina		Horse	?	?	

== Mauritius ==
Location	Name of System	Traction Type	Date (From)	Date (To)	Notes
Port-Louis and Plaines Wilhems	Metro Express	Electric	Dec 2019		

== Morocco ==
Location	Name of System	Traction Type	Date (From)	Date (To)	Notes
Casablanca	Casablanca Tramway	Electric	12 Dec 2012		
Marrakesh		Steam	?	?	
Rabat		Steam	1917	1930	
Rabat	Rabat-Salé tramway	Electric	23 May 2011		

== Mozambique ==
Location	Name of System	Traction Type	Date (From)	Date (To)	Notes
Maputo		Electric	Feb 1904	30 Nov 1936	

== Nigeria ==
Location	Name of System	Traction Type	Date (From)	Date (To)	Notes
Lagos		Steam	23 May 1902	31 Dec 1913	

== Sierra Leone ==
Location	Name of System	Traction Type	Date (From)	Date (To)	Notes
Freetown		Steam	?	?	

== South Africa ==
Location	Name of System	Traction Type	Date (From)	Date (To)	Notes
Franschhoek	Franschhoek Wine tram	Diesel	(Since 1904) 2012	Present	Two double deck trams and one single deck tram operate on the 27km Paarl-Franschhoek branch line
Cape Town – Urban	Trams in Cape Town.	Horse	1 May 1863	?	
Cape Town – Urban	Trams in Cape Town.	Electric	6 Aug 1896	28 Jan 1939	
Cape Town – Urban	♦ Suburban tramway	Electric	Nov 1901	17 Feb 1930	Sea Point – Camps Bay – Burnside Road; See also Trams in Cape Town.
Milnerton	Century City tramway	Electric	2023	Present	It was old Rantanga Junction Railway line. it single track tramway with 1.5km opened in 2023 the Century City, Cape Town, as a tourist attraction, the Ratanga Junction them park now closed.
Durban	Trams in Durban	Horse	1881	?	
Durban	Trams in Durban	Electric	1 May 1902	1 Aug 1949	
♦ Isipingo		Horse	1905	1910s	Closed during World War I.
East London		Electric	25 Jan 1900	25 Oct 1935	
Johannesburg	Trams in Johannesburg	Horse	2 Feb 1891	14 July 1906	The Randtram line was railway which opened on 17 March 1890, then 1 year later became Rand Tram in 1891 first tramway
Johannesburg	Trams in Johannesburg	Electric	14 Feb 1906	18 Mar 1961	
Kimberley	Trams in Kimberley, Northern Cape	Mule	1887	?	
Kimberley	Trams in Kimberley, Northern Cape	Steam	1900	?	
Kimberley	Trams in Kimberley, Northern Cape	Electric	1906	1947	
Kimberley	Trams in Kimberley, Northern Cape	Electric	1985		Heritage tram
Pietermaritzburg	Trams in Pietermaritzburg	Electric	2 Nov 1904	Dec 1936	
Port Elizabeth	Trams in Port Elizabeth	Horse	1881	?	
Port Elizabeth	Trams in Port Elizabeth	Electric	16 Jun 1897	16 Dec 1948	
Pretoria	Pretoria tramway	Horse	1897	?	Church Square to the Union Buildings
Pretoria	Pretoria tramway	Electric	1910	19 Aug 1939	

== Spain (Islas Canarias / Canary Islands) ==
See List of town tramway systems in Spain.

== Sudan ==
Location	Name of System	Traction Type	Date (From)	Date (To)	Notes
al-Ḫarṭūm الخرطوم /Khartoum		Steam	1904	?	
al-Ḫarṭūm الخرطوم /Khartoum		Electric	16 Jan 1928	Feb 1962	

== Tanzania ==
Location	Name of System	Traction Type	Date (From)	Date (To)	Notes
Zanzibar		Animal	1907	?	Domesticated zebras used at opening. See also History of rail transport in Zanzibar.
Zanzibar		Steam	1911	1928	

== Tunisia ==
Location	Name of System	Traction Type	Date (From)	Date (To)	Notes
Manzil Bourgueeba منزل بورقيبة /Menzel Bourguiba		Steam	?	?	
Tūnis تونس /Tunis		Horse	1885	?	
Tūnis تونس /Tunis		Electric	1900	20 Apr 1960	
Tūnis تونس /Tunis	Métro léger de Tunis	Electric	15 Sep 1985		

== Zimbabwe ==
Location	Name of System	Traction Type	Date (From)	Date (To)	Notes
Mutare		Horse	22 Aug 1901	by 1920	

== See also ==
- List of town tramway systems in Africa
- List of town tramway systems in Asia
- List of town tramway systems in Central America
- List of town tramway systems in Europe
- List of town tramway systems in Oceania
- List of town tramway systems in South America
- List of town tramway systems
- List of tram and light rail transit systems
- List of metro systems
- List of trolleybus systems
- Template:Suburban railways in Africa – current rail based systems in Africa.
