= Trams in Durban =

Former public transport system in Durban, South Africa

Coordinates: 29°51′31″S 31°1′20″E

Durban tramway network
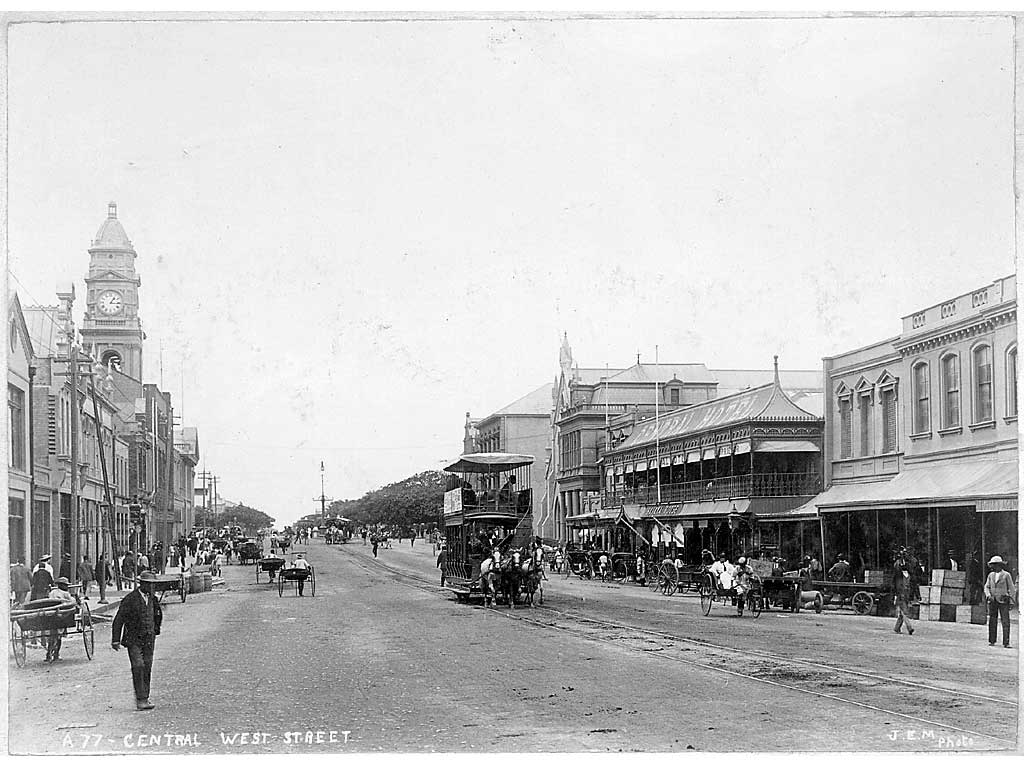
- A double-deck horsecar in West Street (now Dr Pixley Kaseme Street), Durban, ca. 1900.

Operation
- Locale: Durban, South Africa

Statistics
Horsecar era: 1880–c. 1902
- Status: Closed
- Propulsion system: Horses
Electric tram era: 1902–1949
- Status: Closed
- Propulsion system: Electricity

The Durban tramway network formed part of the public transport system in Durban, South Africa, for nearly 70 years until the end of the 1940s.

== History ==
Opened in 25 March 1880, the Durban tramway network was operated initially by horsecars. From 1 May 1902, the network was converted to electrical power. Beginning on 24 February 1935, it was gradually replaced by the Durban trolleybus system, which was opened on that day. The tramway network was finally closed on 2 August 1949.

== See also ==
- History of Durban
- List of town tramway systems in Africa
- Rail transport in South Africa
- Trolleybuses in Durban
