= Trams in Pietermaritzburg =

Former public transport system in Pietermaritzburg, South Africa

Coordinates: 29°35′54″S 30°22′58″E

Pietermaritzburg tramway network
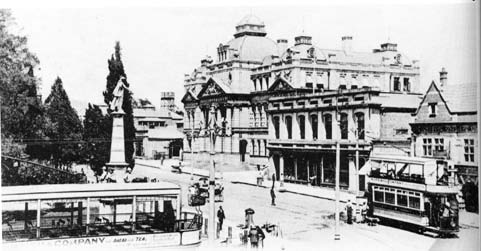
- Double-decker trams in Pietermaritzburg's city centre, ca 1906.

Operation
- Locale: Pietermaritzburg, South Africa
- Open: 2 November 1904
- Close: December 1936
- Status: Closed

Infrastructure
- Propulsion system: Electricity

The Pietermaritzburg tramway network formed part of the public transport system in Pietermaritzburg, South Africa, for just over 32 years in the first half of the 20th century.

== History ==
Opened on 2 November 1904, the network was always operated by electricity. It was closed in December 1936.

== See also ==
- List of town tramway systems in Africa
- Rail transport in South Africa
