= Trams in Cape Town =

Former South African public transport system

Coordinates: 33°55′23″S 18°25′20″E

Cape Town tramway networks
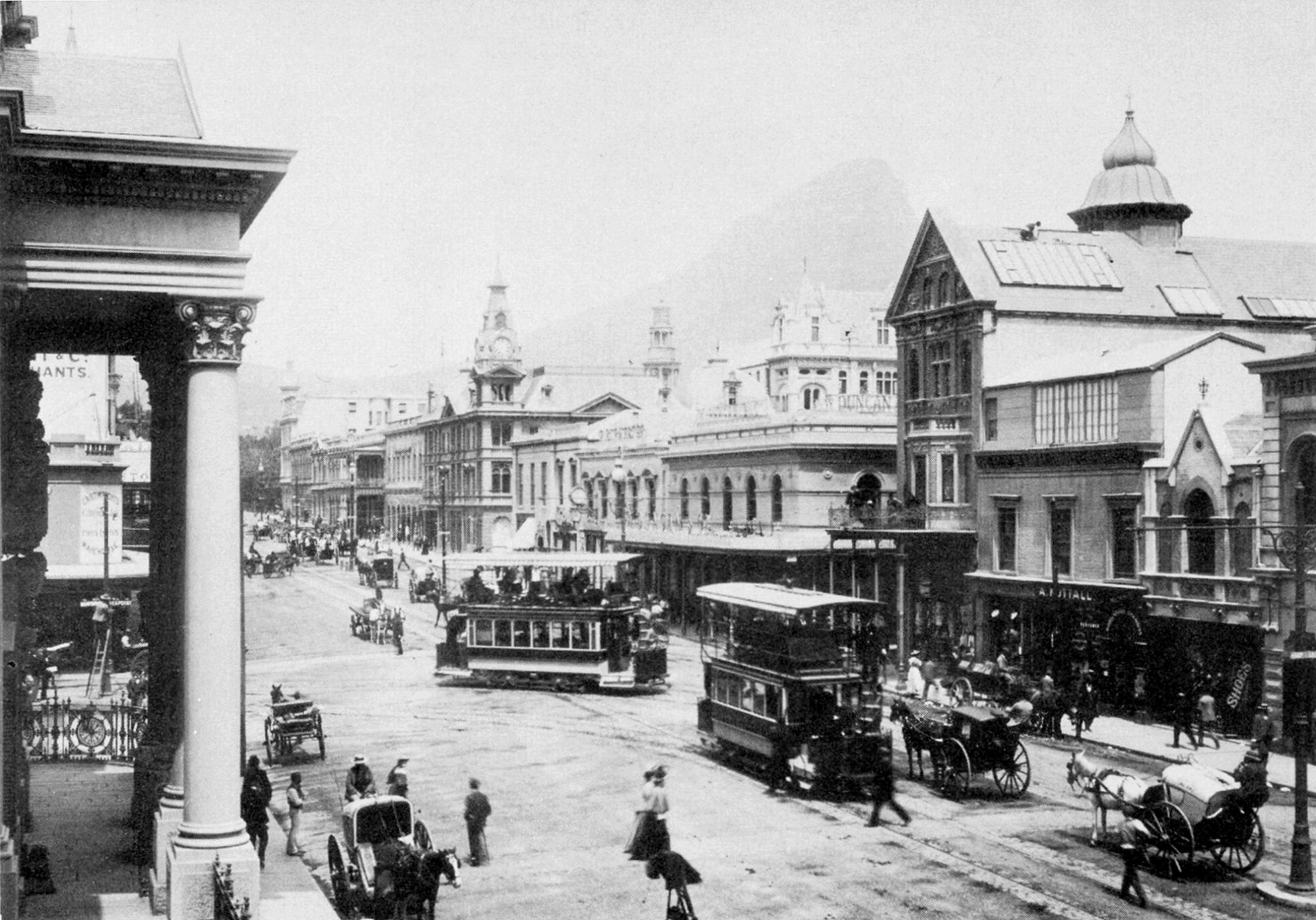
- Double-deck trams, cnr Adderley Street and Darling Street, Cape Town, ca. 1900.

Operation
- Locale: Cape Town, South Africa

Statistics
Urban horsecar era: 1863–c. 1896
- Status: Closed
- Track gauge: 4 ft 9 in (1,448 mm)
- Propulsion system: Horses
Urban electric tram era: 1896–1939
- Status: Closed
- Track gauge: 4 ft 9 in (1,448 mm)
- Propulsion system: Electricity
Camps Bay tramway era: 1901–1930
- Status: Closed
- Operator: Camps Bay Tramways Company Ltd
- Track gauge: 4 ft 9 in (1,448 mm)
- Propulsion system: Electricity
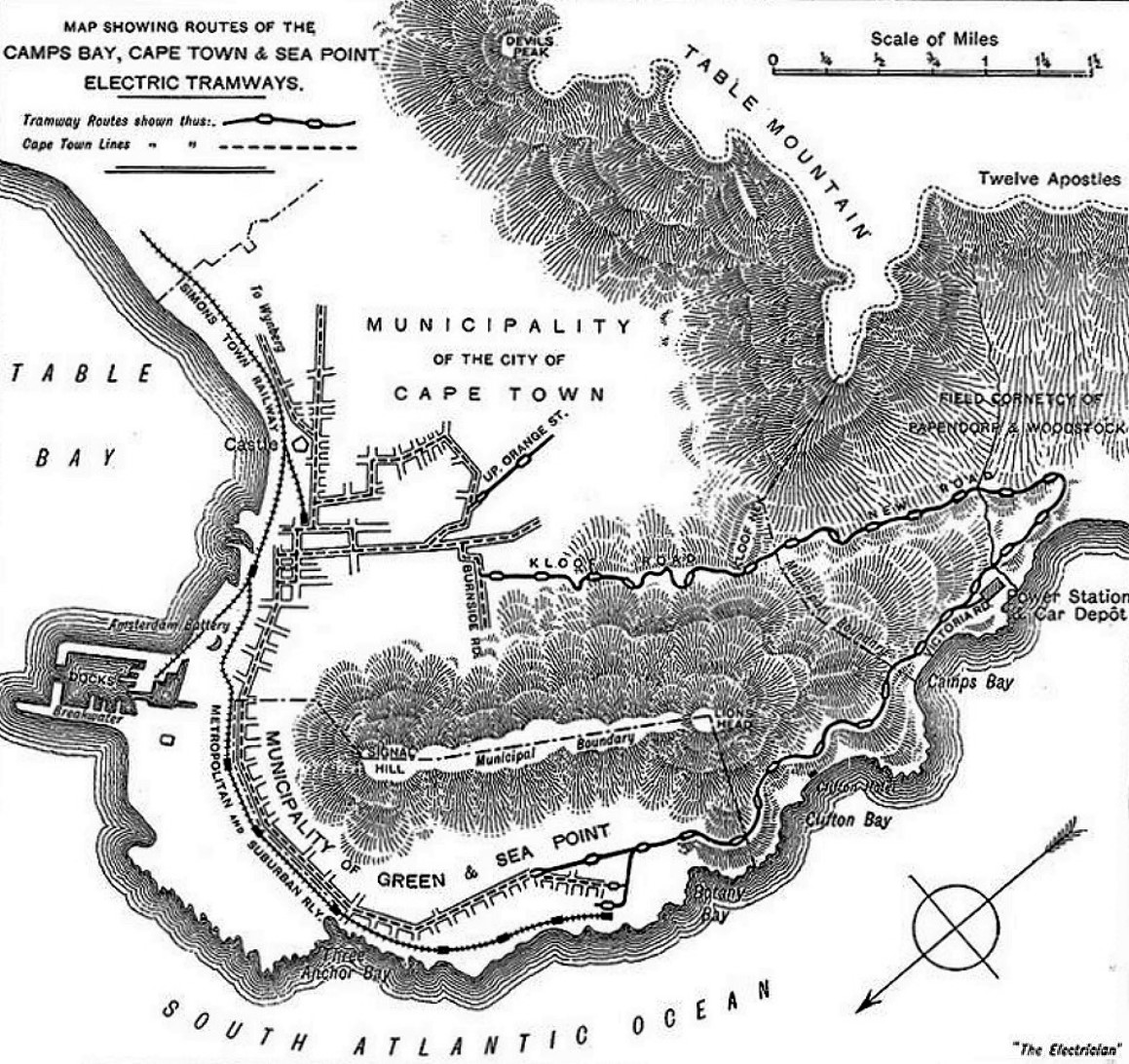
- Tramways in and around Cape Town, ca. 1906.

Cape Town, South Africa, has had two tramway networks forming part of its public transport arrangements. Both networks are now long closed.

== History ==
The first of the two networks to be established was a horsecar network, which was opened on 1 May 1863. In around 1896, it was converted to electrical operation. From 21 December 1935, it was gradually replaced by trolleybuses, which were always referred to by English-speaking locals as "Trackless trams". It was finally closed on 28 January 1939.

The other network, opened in November 1901, was an interurban tramway linking Burnside Road in Cape Town with Camps Bay and Sea Point. It was powered by electricity, and was in operation until 17 February 1930.

== See also ==
- History of Cape Town
- List of town tramway systems in Africa
- Rail transport in South Africa
- Transport in Cape Town
- Trolleybuses in Cape Town
