= Nigel Worden =

British/South African historian (born 1955)

- Born: March 27, 1955 (age 71)
- Education: Jesus College, University of Cambridge
- Scientific career
- Fields: History
- Workplaces: University of Cape Town

Nigel Worden (born 27 March 1955) is a British/South African historian who has researched the history of Cape slavery and the social and cultural history of early colonial Cape Town. He is Emeritus Professor of History and retired from the Historical Studies department at the University of Cape Town, South Africa in 2016. He graduated from Jesus College Cambridge and was subsequently Research Fellow at Clare Hall, University of Cambridge and Lecturer in Commonwealth History at the University of Edinburgh. He holds MA and PhD degrees in History from the University of Cambridge and BA degrees in Art History and Linguistics from the University of South Africa.

== Publications ==
Publications by Nigel Worden include:

- Slavery in Dutch South Africa Cambridge, Cambridge University Press, 1985 reprinted 2010)
- "The slaves, 1652–1834" in R. Elphick and H. Giliomee (eds) The shaping of South African society, 1652–1840 (2nd ed. Maskew Miller Longman, 1989, reprinted 1990, 1991, translated into Afrikaans 1991) [jointly with James Armstrong]
- Breaking the Chains: Slavery and Emancipation in the nineteenth century Cape Colony. Jointly edited with Clifton Crais (Witwatersrand University Press, 1994)
- "Contested heritage at the Cape Town Waterfront", International Journal of Heritage Studies, 2 (1996)
- The Making of Modern South Africa, Conquest, Segregation and Apartheid. (Oxford, Blackwell, first published 1994, 4th edition 2007)
- "Contested heritage in a South African city: Cape Town" in B. Shaw and R. Jones (eds), Contested Urban Heritage: Voices from the Periphery (Aldershot, Ashgate Publishers, 1997).
- Cape Town: The Making of a City. An illustrated history. N. Worden, E. van Heyningen, V. Bickford-Smith (Cape Town, David Philip, 1998) ISBN 978-0-86486-435-2
- "Commemorating, invoking and suppressing Cape slavery" with Kerry Ward in Sarah Nuttall and Carli Coetzee (eds) The Making of Memory in South Africa. Cape Town, Oxford University Press, 1998)
- "National identity and heritage tourism in Melaka", Indonesia and Malay World 31, 31–43.
- Trials of slavery: selected documents concerning slaves from the criminal records of the Council of Justice at the Cape of Good Hope, 1705–1794, edited jointly with Gerald Groenewald, Van Riebeeck Society, Cape Town, 2005.
- "Artisan conflicts in a colonial context: the Cape Town blacksmith strike of 1752", Labor History 46:2 (May 2005), 155–184.
- "New approaches to VOC history in South Africa", South African Historical Journal 59 (2007), 3–18.
- "Strangers ashore: sailor identity and social conflict in mid-18th century Cape Town", Kronos 33 (2007), 72–83.
- "'Below the line the devil reigns': death and dissent aboard a VOC vessel", South African Historical Journal 61:4 (2009), 701–29.
- "Demanding satisfaction: violence, masculinity and honour in late eighteenth-century Cape Town", Kronos 35 (2009), 32–47.
- "The changing politics of slave heritage in the Western Cape, South Africa", Journal of African History 50 (2009), 23–40.
- Honourable intentions? Violence and Virtue in Australian and Cape Colonies, c 1750 to 1850 (Routledge, London, 2016) [edited jointly with P.Russell]
- Cape Town between East and West: Social identities in a Dutch colonial town (Jacana, Johannesburg and Verloren, Hilversum, 2012)
- ‘The environment and slave resistance in the Cape Colony’ in G.Campbell (ed.), Bondage and the environment in the Indian Ocean world (London, 2018), 101-21.
- ‘The colonial town’ in D.Simonton (ed.), The Routledge History Handbook of Gender and the Urban Experience (London and New York, 2017), 397-400
- ‘Slavery in South Africa’ in M.Gosselink, M.Holtrop and R.Ross (eds.), Good Hope: South Africa and the Netherlands from 1600 (Amsterdam, 2017), 119-33 [jointly with W.Dooling]
- ‘Insult and identity in late eighteenth-century Cape Town’ in Iva Pesa and Jan-Baart Gewald (eds.), Magnifying Perspectives: Contributions to History. A Festschrift for Robert Ross (Leiden, 2017), 99-117
- ‘Between two oceans: slave resistance at the Cape of Good Hope in the age of revolutions’, World History Connected 15:2 (June, 2018) [online journal]
- ‘Writing the global Indian Ocean’, Journal of Global History 12 (2017), 145-54
- ‘Indian Ocean slaves in Cape Town, 1695-1807’, Journal of Southern African Studies 42:3 (2016), 389-408
- ‘Cape slaves in the paper empire of the VOC’, Kronos 40 (2014), 23-44.
- ‘Constructing and contesting histories of slavery at the Cape, South Africa’, Proceedings of the British Academy 168 (2011), 393–419. [jointly with A.Malan].
- ‘After race and class: recent trends in the historiography of early colonial Cape society’, South African Historical Journal 62:3 (2010), 589-602.
- ‘Coercizione e libertà nella Colonia del Capo, Sudafrica, 1652-1806’, Afriche e Orienti 11, 3-4 (2009), 17-36.

== Awards ==
He has received the following awards:

- G. Wesley Johnson Award from the U.S Council on Public History for the best article in the field of public history published in 1994 (1995)
- Meritorious publication award, UCT for Cape Town: the Making of a City (2000)
- Overseas Visiting Fellowship, St. John's College, Cambridge (2002);
- Nelson Mandela Chair in Humanities grant to edit volume of slave court testimonies to be published by the Van Riebeeck Society (2003–04)
- Western Cape Provincial Honours: Premier's Commendation for contributions to the study of slavery (2005)
