= Trolleybuses in Durban =

Part of Durban's public transport system

Durban trolleybus system
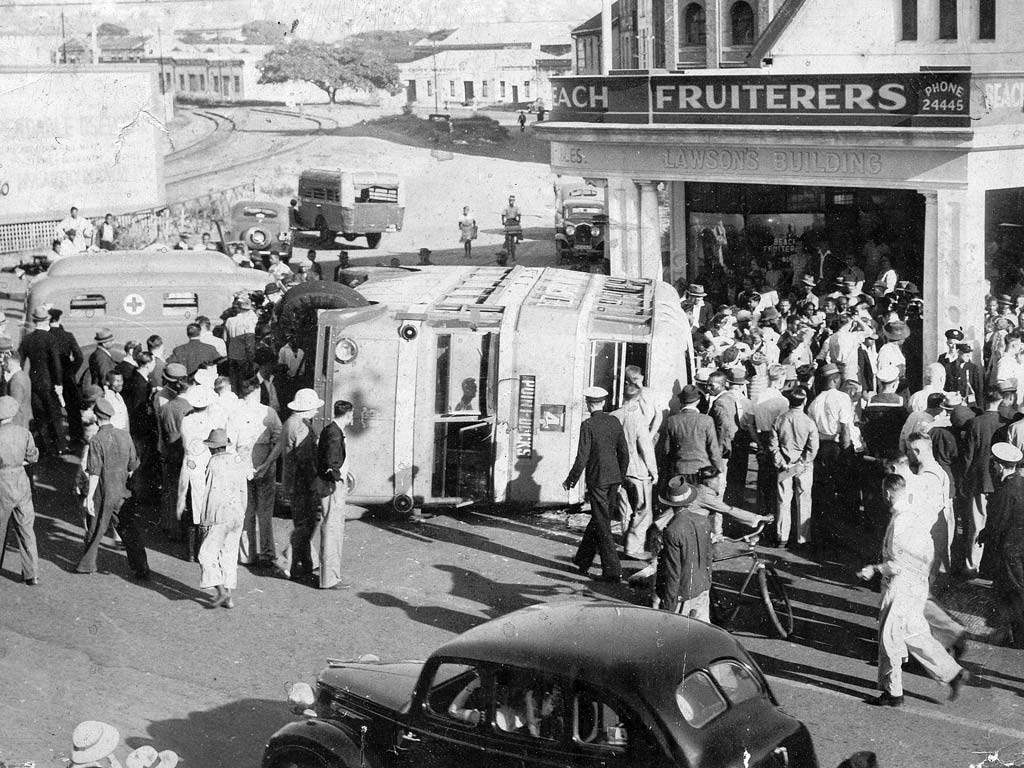
- The 1941 trolleybus turnover.

Operation
- Locale: Durban, South Africa
- Open: 24 February 1935
- Close: 11 April 1968
- Status: Closed

Statistics
Overview
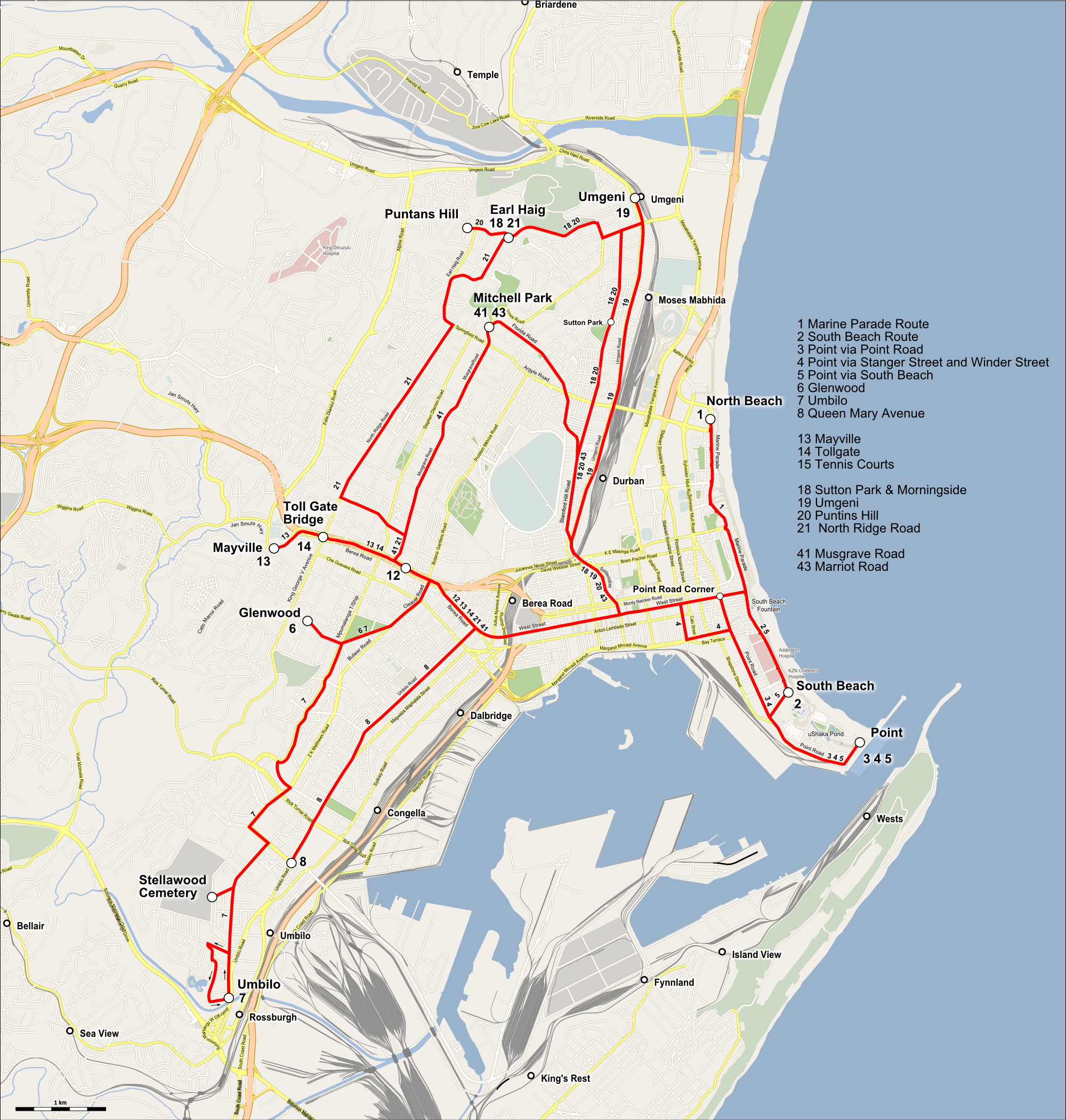

The Durban trolleybus system was part of the public transport network in Durban, South Africa, for more than 30 years in the mid-20th century.

According to several sources, the Durban system was the first such system worldwide to experience an accident involving an overturned trolleybus. Thirty seven people were injured in that accident, which occurred on 5 March 1941.

Durban's trolleybuses were also unique in being fitted with fishing rod racks at the back.

== See also ==
- History of Durban
- List of trolleybus systems
