= Coat of arms of Cape Town =

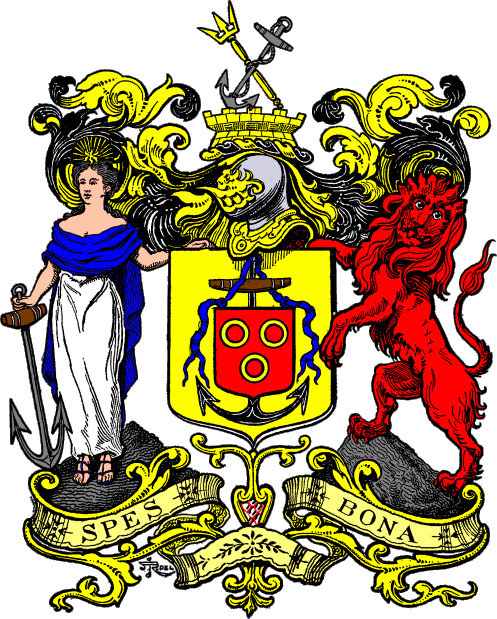
The arms of Cape Town

The coat of arms of Cape Town is the traditional symbol of the municipality of Cape Town. The arms are no longer in official use.

== History ==
The original seal, depicting the arms of the city's founder, Jan van Riebeeck, supported by an anchor symbolising the Cape of Good Hope, was granted to the city by the Commissioner-General of the Batavian Republic in June 1804. In 1894, the municipal council placed the Van Riebeeck arms and anchor on a golden shield, and in 1898 it adopted a crest consisting of a mural crown ensigned of an anchor.

In December 1899, the College of Arms in London issued Letters Patent which confirmed these arms, modified the crest, and added supporters. This achievement of arms, together with the new seal depicting them, was registered with the Cape Provincial Administration in 1956, and with the Bureau of Heraldry on 16 January 1972.

In heraldic terms the coat of arms is described as follows:

- Arms: Or, an anchor erect Sable, stock proper, from the ring a riband flowing Azure and suspended therefrom an escutcheon Gules charged with three annulets Or.
- Crest: On the battlements of a tower proper, a trident in bend Or, surmounted by an anchor and cable in bend sinister, Sable.
- Wreath and mantling: Or and Sable.
- Supporters: On a compartment below the shield consisting of rocky mounds, dexter, a female figure proper vested Argent, mantle and sandals Azure, on her head an estoile irradiated Or, supporting with her dexter hand an anchor proper; sinister, a lion rampant guardant Gules.
- Motta: Spes Bona (Good Hope).

== See also ==
- South African heraldry
- Flag of Cape Town
