= Trams in Cairo =

Former Egyptian public transit system

Trams in Greater Cairo
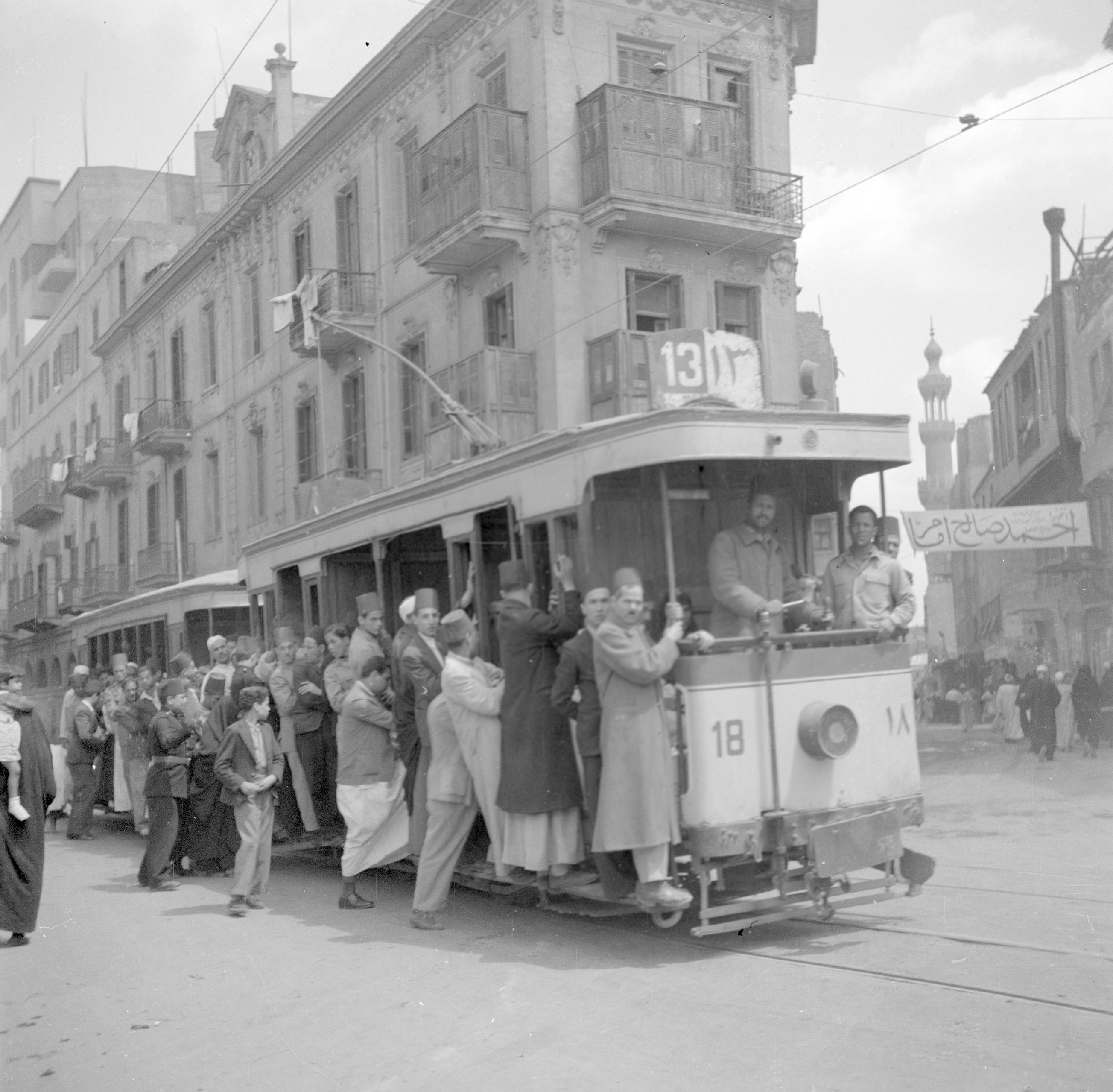
- Cairo Tram in 1935

Overview
- Locale: Greater Cairo, Egypt
- Transit type: Tram

Operation
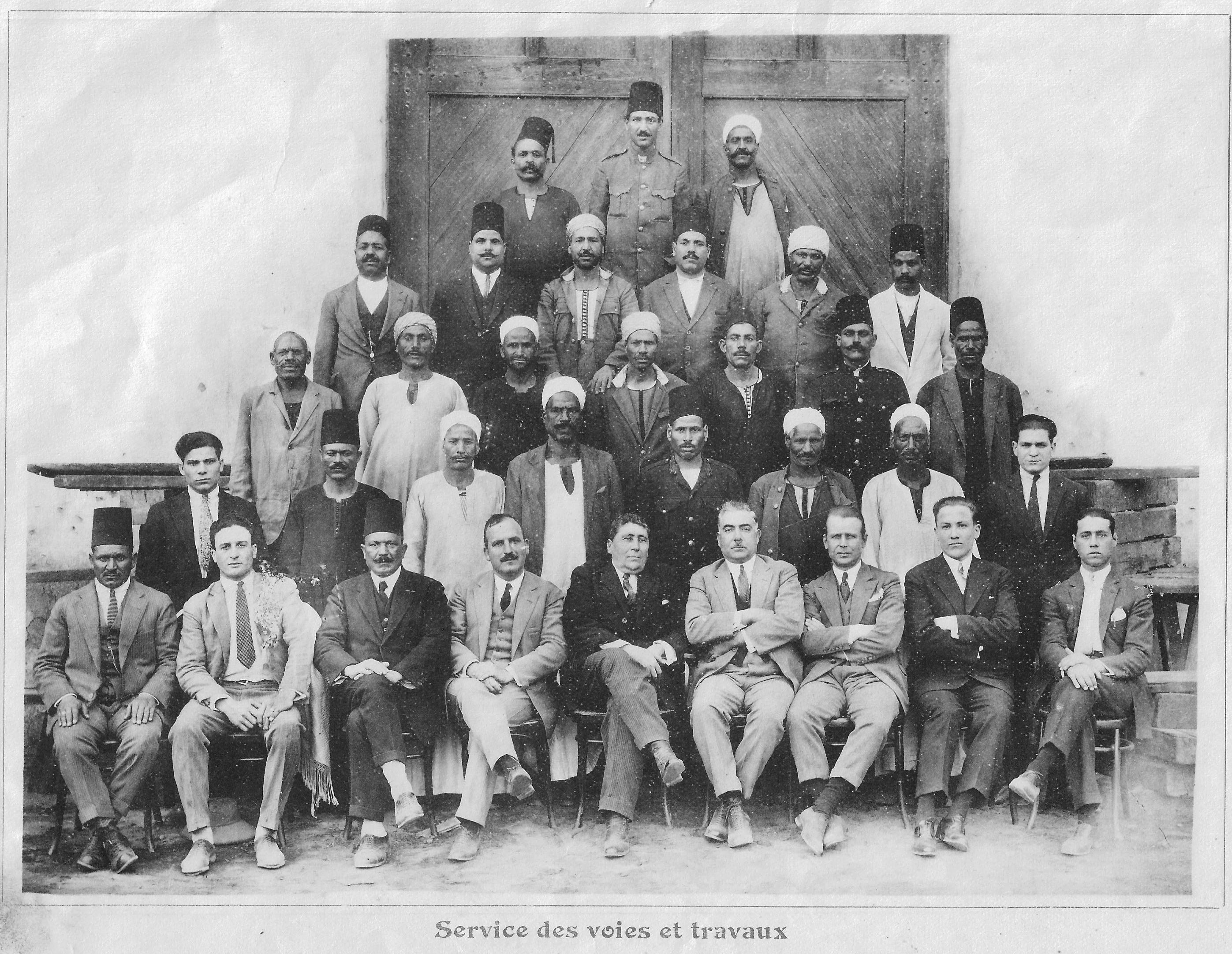
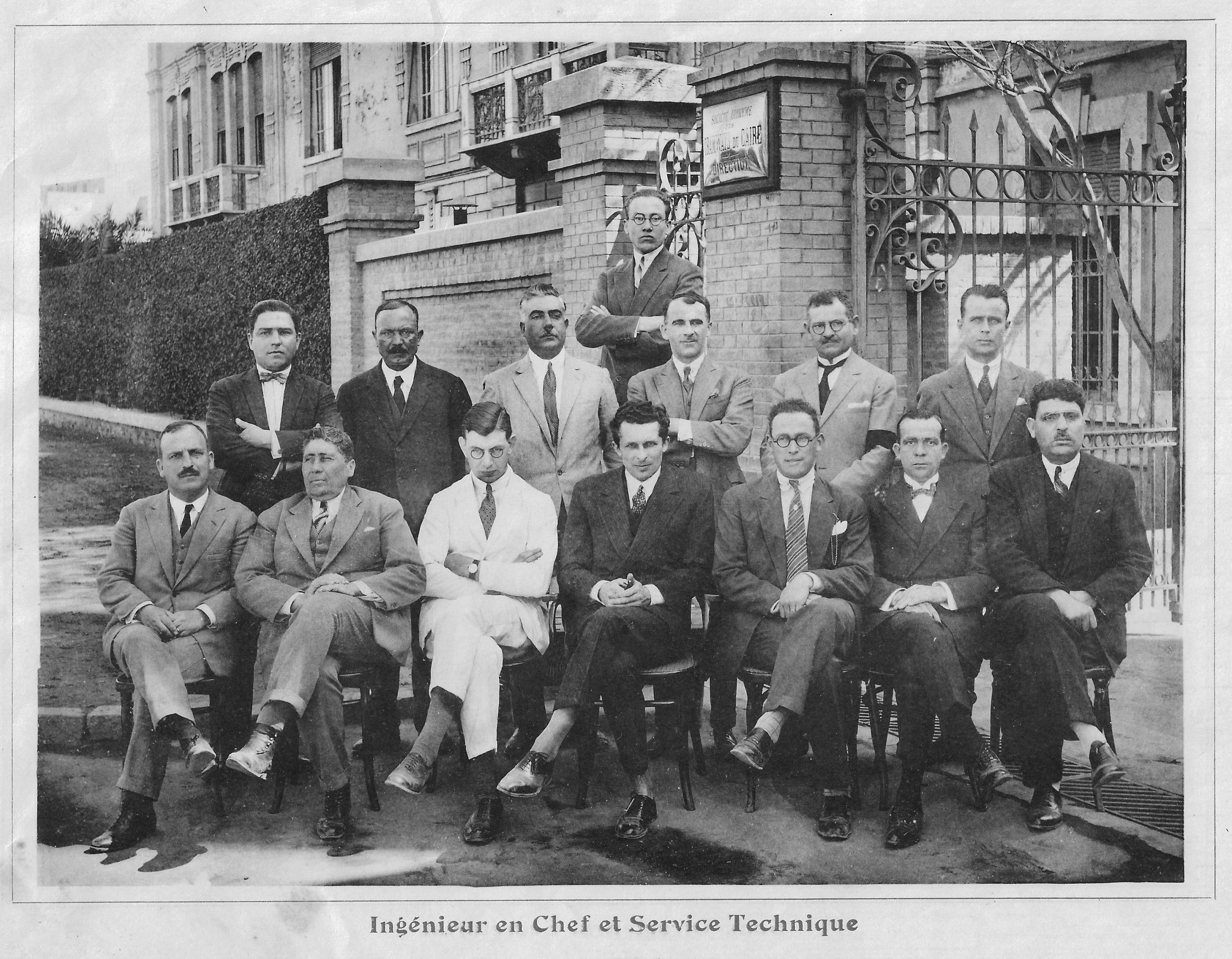
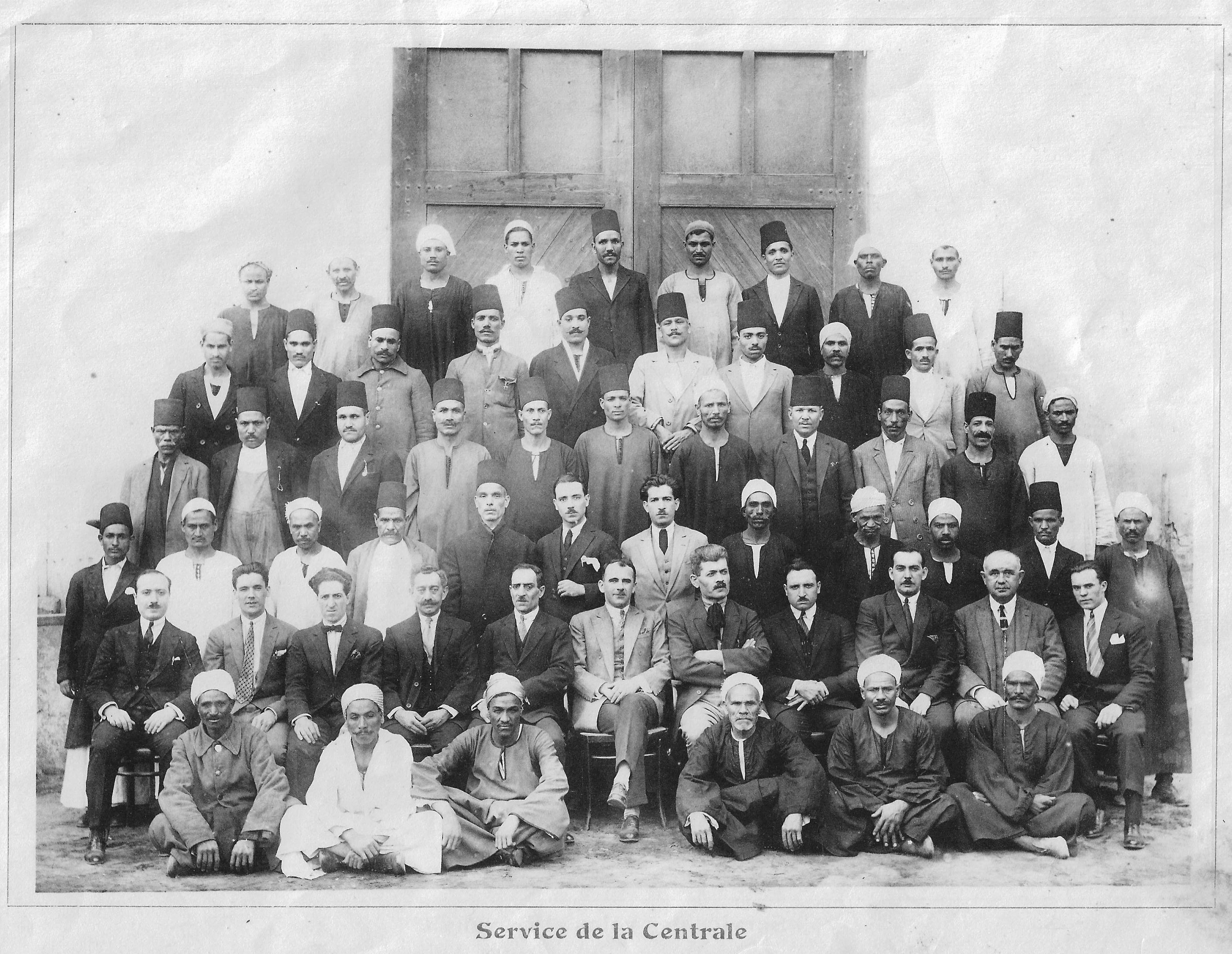
- Began operation: 12 August 1896
- Ended operation: 2019
- Operator: Cairo Transportation Authority (CTA)

Technical
- Track gauge: 1,000 mm (3 ft 3 3/8 in)
- Electrification: 600 V DC overhead line
System map
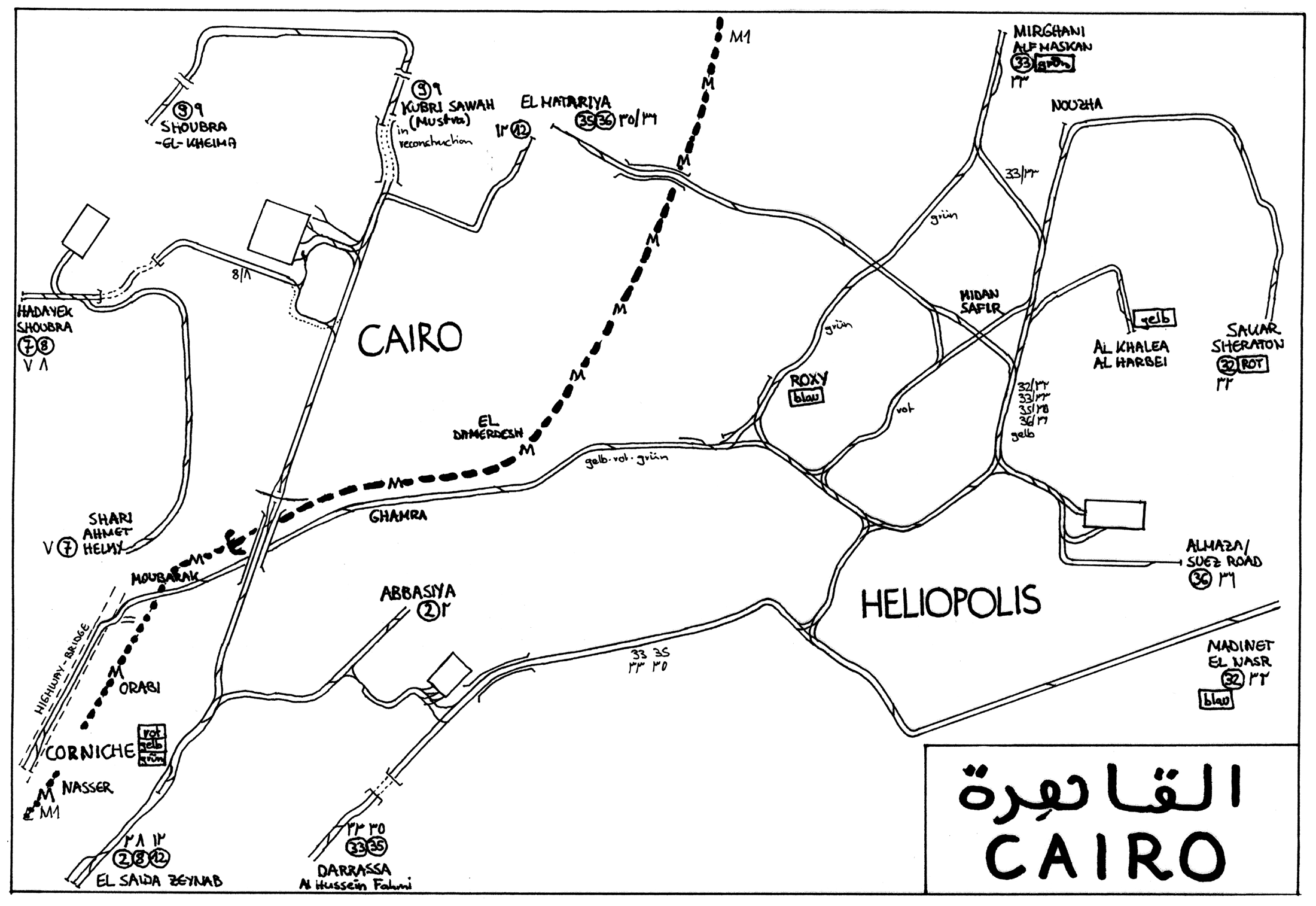

Constructed near the beginning of the 20th century, until 2014 the Cairo tramway network was still used in modern-day Cairo, especially in modern areas, like Heliopolis and Nasr City. During the 1970s, government policies favoured making space for cars, resulting in the removal of over half of the 120-kilometre (75 mi) network. Trams were removed entirely from central Cairo but continued to run in Heliopolis and Helwan.

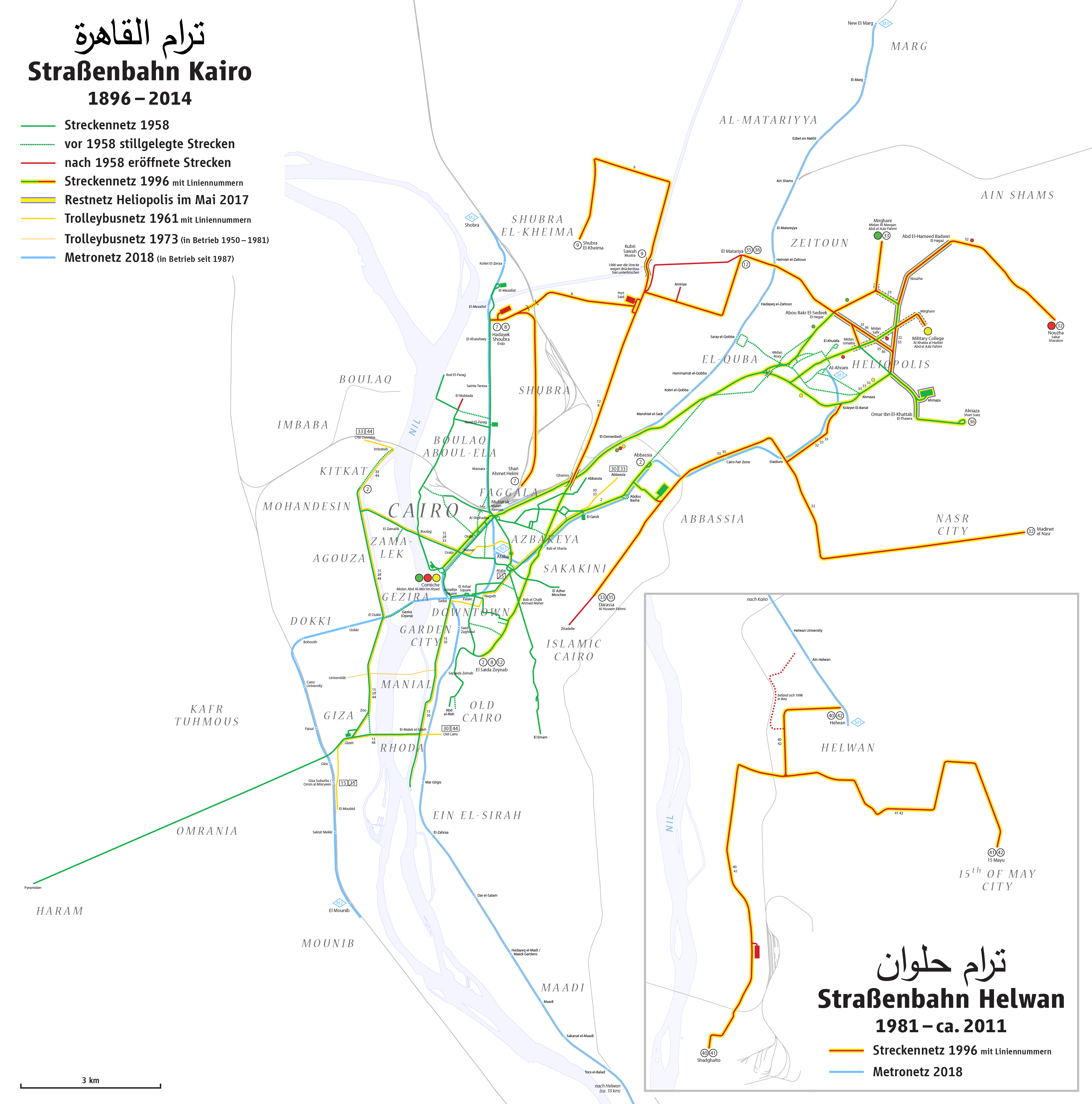
Map of the Cairo and Helwan tramway lines

However, Helwan's part of the system shut down completely in the aftermath of the 2011 Egyptian revolution, and in 2014–2015 the surviving tram service in Heliopolis was almost entirely discontinued. Only a short section of one line in Heliopolis, between Court Square and the Tivoli Dome, continued to be operated. By the end of 2019, service had ceased definitively, with tracks dismantled in order to widen the neighborhood's roads as well as to build bridges above the tracks.
