= Flag of Cape Town =

Flag used by the City of Cape Town municipality

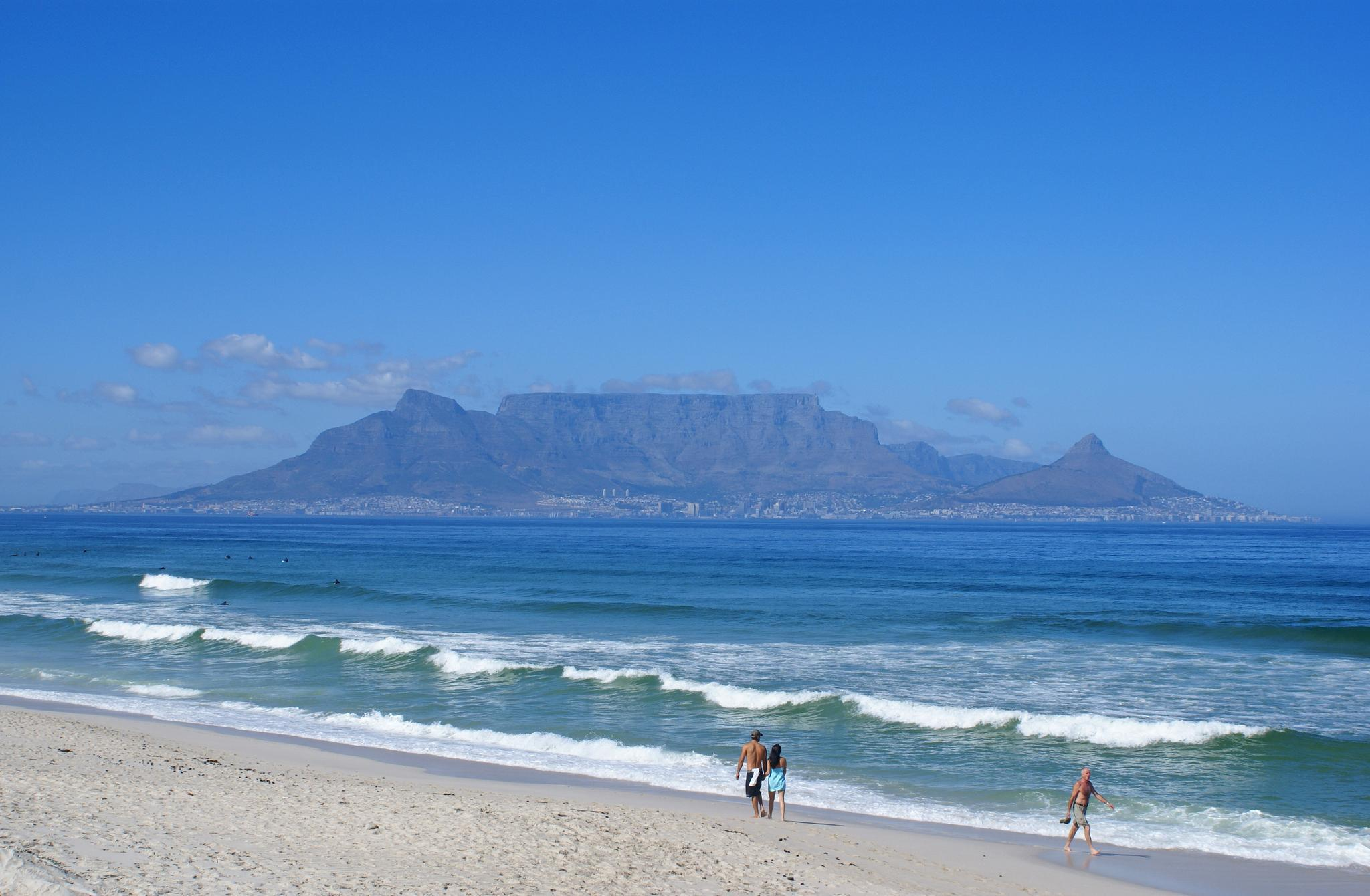
Table Mountain had been used as the basis of the City of Cape Town's various logos since 1996.

The flag of Cape Town is the flag used by the City of Cape Town municipality. It is not an officially registered flag, but consists of the city's logo used in flag form, and since 1996 it has changed each time the city's logo has changed.

The city's current logo was adopted in 2014 and is used on the city's flag. It consists of a rosette of four concentric rings, each made up of six silhouettes of Table Mountain.

From about 2003 until 2004, the logo consisted of a white outline of Table Mountain on a rainbow brush stroke background.

From 1996 until around 2003, the flag featured a silhouette of Table Mountain. It was created by a graphic designer and was not registered with the South African Bureau of Heraldry. The design consisted of a stylised image of Table Mountain (and neighbouring peaks Devil's Peak and Lion's Head) in white on a background of blue in the top left section and green in the top right section. Below the Table Mountain image is a yellow "paint brush" horizontal stripe under which is a red section at the bottom of the flag.

Before 1996, the flag consisted of the coat of arms of Cape Town on a blue field.

== Gallery ==
1997–2003

2003–2004

2014–present
