= Baphumelele Children's Home =

Home for orphaned and other vulnerable children in South Africa

Coordinates: 34°1′45″S 18°39′15″E

Baphumelele Children's Home was founded in 2001 as a refuge and place of safety for orphaned and other vulnerable children from the Cape Flats. The home is one of the first in the township of Khayelitsha, one of the largest in South Africa.

The founder of Baphumelele, Rosie Mashale, is a trained primary school teacher. She has been selected as a Mama Afrika by Clover. She has also been selected as a finalist in the Cape Times V&A Waterfront Woman of Worth Awards.

== History ==
Located in the crime ridden township of Khayelitsha, inhabited by around one million people and located 30 km southeast of downtown Cape Town, Baphumelele grew out of one of the most destitute shack settlements in South Africa.

In 1989 Rosalie Mashale moved from the Eastern Cape to Khayelitsha. She was extremely disturbed to see young children going through garbage dumps and looking for food without any supervision while their parents were away at work. One day, when an abandoned baby was left on her doorstep, Rosie took him in and tried to find him a new home. Soon, her reputation in the community grew as someone who had too much heart to turn a needy child away. As more and more children were dropped at her doorstep, she took this as a sign from God that forming a Children's Home was to be her work on Earth. Through hard work, determination and the help of the community, Baphumelele has rapidly grown into a Children's Home, a daycare centre for over 230 children, a Respite Centre of adults with HIV/AIDS and TB, a children's Respite Centre, outreach projects helping child headed homes and people needing home-based care, as well as a new residential project called the Fountain of Hope for youth transitioning from children's homes.

The Baphumelele community provides food, healthcare, education and a refuge from the surrounding violence to orphaned and vulnerable children from all over Cape Town. Employing more than 150 permanent staff, it has part-time medical team including doctor and two nurses, and provides services to over 250 preschool-aged children.

== Fountain of Hope ==
The Fountain of Hope program is intended for young people aged 18–21 who have been raised in residential care, or who have recently been orphaned or are in a vulnerable situation. The program provides a platform for the youth to learn the necessary skills to contribute to society economically and socially and to allow those still in high school to finish their education.

Located on around a hectare of farmland on Schaapkraal Road in the Philippi Horticultural area, on the Cape Flats, the farm can accommodate up to 18 youth, both males and females. The small-scale operational farm acts as a training ground for the youth, as well as providing employment to the local community and providing a small return through the sale of the produce. The program lasts for 12 months.
