= Tabletalk (Cape Town) =

- Type: Weekly newspaper
- Owner: Independent Newspapers Cape
- Editor: Yolande du Preez
- Founded: 1987
- Headquarters: Cape Town, South Africa
- Circulation: 67 673 (2026)
- Website: Independent Newspapers Cape - Tabletalk

Tabletalk (formerly Table Talk and Table Talk & Mail, founded 1987, is a weekly local newspaper in the West Coast region of Cape Town, South Africa. It is published once a week by Cape Community Newspapers, a division of Independent Newspapers Cape. The newspaper is distributed free to West Coast suburbs including Milnerton, Table View, Bloubergstrand, West Beach, Parklands, Sunset Beach and Big Bay.

== History ==
Tabletalk was founded by Milnerton resident Heather Brenner under the name Table Talk in February 1987. She had no previous experience in journalism. In June 1988, it was bought by Unicorn Publishing, who merged it with the Milnerton Mail under the title of Table Talk & Mail. In 1991, Unicorn Publishing was purchased by the Argus Group, which was itself purchased by Independent Newspapers in 1996. In the mid-1990s, the paper's title was reverted to its original title under the spelling Tabletalk. Brenner was the paper's sole journalist until her retirement in 2005.
