= Planet Hollywood bombing =

1998 bomb attack in Cape Town, South Africa

- Location: 33.9065°S 18.4194°E; V&A Waterfront, Cape Town, South Africa
- Date: 25 August 1998; 28 years ago
- Weapon: pipe bomb
- Deaths: 2
- Injuries: 26
- Perpetrator: People Against Gangsterism and Drugs (PAGAD)

The Planet Hollywood bombing was an Islamic terrorist bomb attack that took place at the Planet Hollywood restaurant at the V&A Waterfront in Cape Town, South Africa. On the night of 25 August 1998 a bomb detonated beneath the footrest of the bar at the restaurant. One victim died in the blast whilst a second victim died later in hospital. A number of victims lost limbs in the blast and were permanently maimed including a 12-year-old British tourist. The United States government sent FBI agents to assist in the investigation of the blast.

The attack was committed by the vigilante group Muslims Against Global Oppression later known as People Against Gangsterism and Drugs (PAGAD). PAGAD admitted they committed the attack stating that it was done in retaliation for American air-raids in Sudan and Afghanistan.
