= Trolleybuses in Cape Town =

Public transport network in Cape Town, South Africa

Cape Town trolleybus system
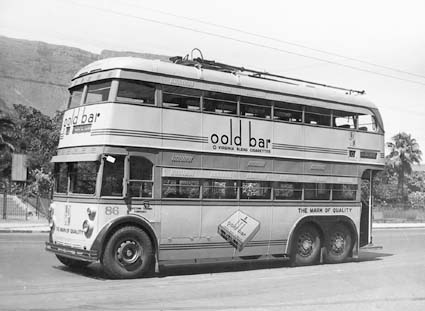
- Sunbeam trolleybus no. 86 in Cape Town, 1940.

Operation
- Locale: Cape Town, South Africa
- Open: 21 December 1935
- Close: 28 February 1964
- Status: Closed
- Operator: City Tramways Co Ltd

The Cape Town trolleybus system was part of the public transport network in Cape Town, South Africa, for nearly 30 years in the mid-twentieth century. The trolleybuses on the system were always referred to by English-speaking locals as "Trackless trams", and even the systems's stops were marked "Trackless Tram Stop".

== See also ==
- History of Cape Town
- List of trolleybus systems
