= List of windmills in South Africa =

A list of windmills in South Africa.

Extant windmills in South Africa.
1 location of Cape Town - see individual map. 2 De Molen, Edenvale.
Windmills in Cape Town.
1 Nieuwe Molen. 2 Onze Molen. 3 Mostert's Mill. 4 Oude Molen

== Locations ==
=== Western Cape ===
Location	Name of mill and coordinates	Type	Built	Notes	Photograph
Maitland, Cape Town	De Nieuwe Molen; 33°55′57″S 18°28′55″E	Tower	1782	Windmill World	
Mowbray, Cape Town	Mostert's Mill; 33°57′08″S 18°27′58″E	Tower	c. 1796	Windmill World	
Durbanville	Onze Molen; 33°49′56″S 18°38′20″E	Tower	c. 1801	Windmill World	
Pinelands, Cape Town	Oude Molen; 33°56′24″S 18°29′23″E		1717	Windmill World	
Woodstock, Cape Town	Pyott's Mill	Tower			
Durbanville	Angus Mill	Smock	1895		Demolished
Mowbray, Cape Town	Onderneming Mill	Tower	1849		Demolished
Mowbray, Cape Town	Clapperton's Mill	Tower	1770	1903	Demolished
Mowbray, Cape Town	Valkenburg Mill	Tower	1803	1827	Demolished
Salt River, Cape Town	The Hope Mill	Tower	1844	1863	Demolished
Salt River, Cape Town	Salt River Mill	Tower	1844	1863	Demolished
Salt River, Cape Town	Broekman Mill (Welvergenoegd)	Tower	1844	1863	Demolished
Salt River, Cape Town	Twistwyk Dur Mill	Tower			Demolished
Salt River, Cape Town	Groot Zoor Mill (Dwars in die Weg)	Tower			Demolished
Paarl	Agter Paarl Mill	Tower	1884		Demolished
Bredasdorp	Bredasdorp Mill	Tower			Demolished
Saldanha	Brinks Mill	Post	1848		Demolished
Malmesbury	Dassenberg Mill	Tower	1843		Demolished
Clanwilliam	Ebenezer Mill (Olifants River)	Post	1845	Missionary Station	Demolished
Humansdorp	Humansdorp Mill	Tower			Demolished
Mossel Bay	Mossel Bay Mill	Tower			Demolished

=== Other locations ===
Location	Name of mill and coordinates	Type	Built	Notes	Photograph
Alexandria	Whitney Mill	Smock	1856	1942 Restored	now demolished
Bathurst	Bathurst Mill		1830		
Bathurst	(2nd mill)		1830	1855	
Bathurst	(3rd mill)		1840	1855	
Bathurst	(4th mill)		1855	1855	
Bonnie Doon, Somerset West	Bonnie Doon Windpump	tower	1974		
Bredasdorp		Smock	1849	1908, demolished by 1912	
Clumber			1860	1870	
Clumber	(2nd mill)		1860	1870	
Cradock	Frederick Korsten's Mill	tower	1812	1860	
Edenvale	De Molen; 26°08′48″S 28°09′17″E	Smock	¾ scale replica of Zeldenrust, Westerwijtwerd, Groningen, Netherlands.	Windmill World	
Grahamstown	Heath's Mill	Post mill	1817	1843	
Grahamstown	Richardson's Mill		1830	1876	
Grahamstown	(3rd mill)		1850	1855	
Grahamstown	(4th mill)		1850	1855	
Grahamstown	(5th mill)		1855	1855	
Hartebeespoort	Jasmyn Mill				
Kaffir Drift			1830	1835	
Port Frances			1830	1835	
Salem			1845	1855	
Sidbury			1845	1855	
Southwell			1860	1870	
Southwell	(2nd mill)		1860	1870	
Trappes Valley			1835	1835	
Winterberg			1840	1845	
Winterberg	(2nd mill)		1845	1845	

== Notes ==
Known building dates are in bold text. Non-bold text denotes first known date. Dates in "Notes" column is last known date the mill was in existence unless otherwise stated. One of the Salt River windmills was standing in 1844, and one of them was standing c. 1896.
