= Sarah Oates =

Violinist, Associate leader

- Born: Sarah Jane Oates; 26 June 1976 (age 50); Johannesburg, South Africa
- Education: Fairmont High, Hugo Lambrechts Music Centre, Purcell School of Music, Royal Northern College of Music, Manhattan School of Music
- Occupations: Violinist, concertmaster
- Years active: 1990–present
- Website: http://sarahoates.eu/

Sarah Jane Oates is violinist and associate leader at the Philharmonia Orchestra in London, United Kingdom

== Background ==
Oates was born in Johannesburg, South Africa on 26 June 1976. Her family then moved to Durbanville, Western Cape, South Africa. At the age of nine she started with lessons at the Hugo Lambrechts Music Centre in Parow, South Africa. Louis van der Watt was her teacher.

== Education ==
Oates matriculated at Fairmont High. She went to London, UK to study at Purcell School of Music after she received a bursary in 1992. Yossi Zivoni was the teacher. After that she went to the Royal Northern College of Music in Manchester, UK. She moved to the United States and studied under Pinchas Zukerman at the Manhattan School of Music. She was later taught by Alexander Kerr

== Performances ==
Oates performed with various groups. At the Santa Fe chamber music festival her performing career started. This was in New Mexico. She has performed violin concertos with:

- The London Philharmonia Chamber Ensemble
- Cape Town Philharmonic Orchestra
- Holland Symfonia
- Natal Philharmonic
- The Royal Flemish Philharmonic
- RNCM Symphony Orchestra
- 2015 — Performed in the opening concert of the new Philharmonia Chamber Music Series in the Royal Festival Hall, London

== Leading positions ==
- 2008 to 2013 -Concertmaster of the Holland Symfonia Orchestra in Amsterdam
- 2013 to current -The second concertmaster of the Philharmonia Orchestra, London

== Other ==
Oates is a member of the Devich Piano Trio. The trio is:

- Hanna Devich, Hungaria, Piano
- Jasper Havelaar, Netherlands, Cello
- Oates as a violinist

She is also a part writer of Music books.
