= Tamaryn Schultz =

South african gymnast

Personal information
- Nationality: South African
- Born: Tamaryn Schultz; April 23, 1985
- Education: Fairmont High School, Durbanville

Tamaryn Schultz (born 23 April 1985) is a South African gymnast.

== Childhood ==
She was born on 23 April 1985 and grew up in Durbanville, Western Cape, South Africa. She matriculated at Fairmont High School, Durbanville.

== Gymnastic performance ==
She performed in various competitions in different countries.

- 25 June 2000, she won the South African National Championship (held in Centurion, South Africa) with a score of 35, winning three of the four gymnastics disciplines (vault, bars, beam and floor) in the junior category.
- 14 September 2001, in her first year as a senior she placed second to the 2000 champion Joyce, in the South African National Championship (held in Pretoria, South Africa).
- 5 November 2001, she placed second in the "Internationaler Leverkusen Cup" (held in Leverkusen, Germany) with a score of 32.775, just beaten by Nijssen of The Netherlands.
- In the 6th African Gymnastics Championships in 2002, held in Algeria, she placed first overall with 33.112 points.
- 20 November 2002, she represented South Africa in The World Artistic Championship in Debrecen, Hungary, and obtained the following places: Floor - 36th, Bars - 40th, Beams - 41st.
