= Fairmont High School, Durbanville =

Fairmont High School
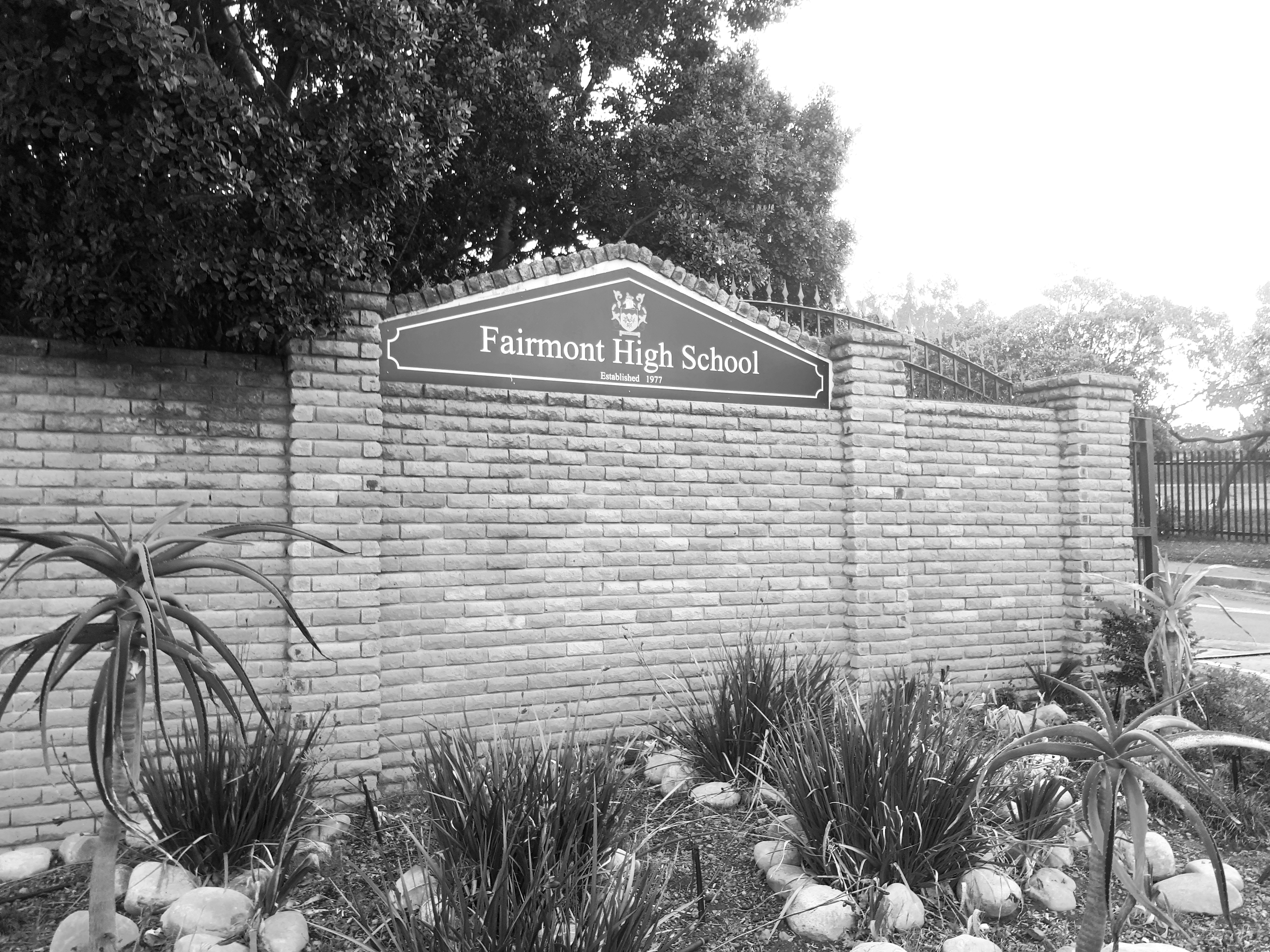
- Fairmont today

Location
- Medway Crescent; Durbanville, Western Cape, 7550; South Africa
- 33.8537°S 18.6407°E

Information
- School type: Public
- Motto: Stand Fast
- Religious affiliation: Christian
- Established: 1977; 49 years ago
- School district: District 4
- Principal: Francois Jansen Van Rensburg (acting)
- Teaching staff: 80
- Grades: 8–12
- Gender: Co-Ed
- Age: 14 to 18
- Enrollment: 1,450
- Average class size: 25
- Houses: Dale, Innes, Muir
- Colours: Red; Green; Yellow
- Nickname: Monties
- Rival: Hoërskool Durbanville; The Settlers High School
- Accreditation: Western Cape Education Department
- Feeder schools: Gene Louw, Eversdal, Kenridge, Durbanville
- Alumni: Sarah Oates, Tamaryn Schultz
- Website: www.fairmont.co.za

Fairmont High School is a public English medium co-educational high school situated in the town of Durbanville in the Western Cape province of South Africa.

== Background ==
The school was established in January 1977 and initially known as Eversdal English Medium School. The school was officially opened on 5 September 1978 by P.S. Meyer – Director of Education. Clive Wigg was the first principal and remained headmaster until 2002, when he retired. Liz Muller took over from him, but she died in 2006. She was replaced by Ron Dingley who served until 2016. Leon Erasmus then served as principal until his tragic passing due to cancer in 2025.

The three school houses take their names from Sir Langham Dale, Sir James Rose Innes and Sir Thomas Muir, each having held the position of Superintendent-General of Education in the Cape.

== School's performance ==
In 2009, Fairmont was named as one of the top ten performing schools in mathematics and science in South Africa.

== Alumni ==
- Sarah Oates. At Fairmont High in 1990, she was the youngest member of the National Youth Orchestra playing the violin. She went on to perform concertos with the Royal Flemish Philharmonic, the Natal Philharmonic, Holland Symfonia, RNCM Symphony and Orchestra, the Cape Town Philharmonic.
- Tamaryn Schultz. She was at the school in 2000. She represented South Africa in gymnastics.
