= Alexandra Hospital (Cape Town) =

Mental health care hospital in South Africa

- Western Cape Department of Health
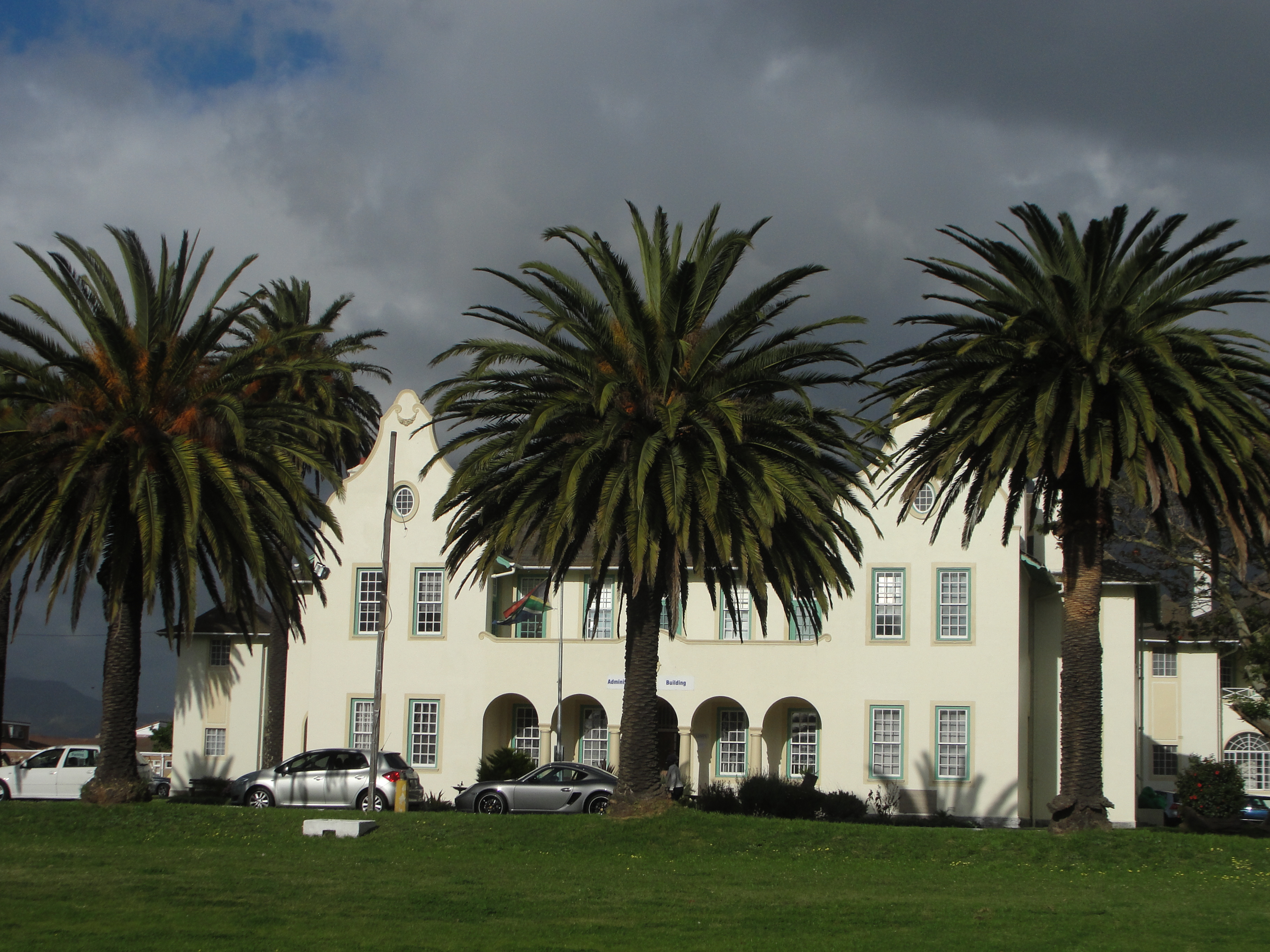
- Administration Building of Maitland Hospital

- Shown in Cape Town

Geography
- Location: Maitland, Cape Town, Western Cape, South Africa
- Coordinates: 33.931968°S 18.483704°E type:landmark_region:

Organisation
- Care system: Department of Health
- Type: Mental health

History
- Founded: 1906

Links
- Website: www.westerncape.gov.za/facility/alexandra-hospital
- Lists: Hospitals in South Africa

The Alexandra Hospital is a specialist mental health care hospital in Cape Town, South Africa. It provides care for complex mental health issues and intellectual disability.

The grounds of the hospital also include the historic windmill, De Nieuwe Molen.
