= Dutch Reformed Church, Durbanville =

Church in Durbanville, South Africa

Coordinates: 33°50′12″S 18°38′48″E

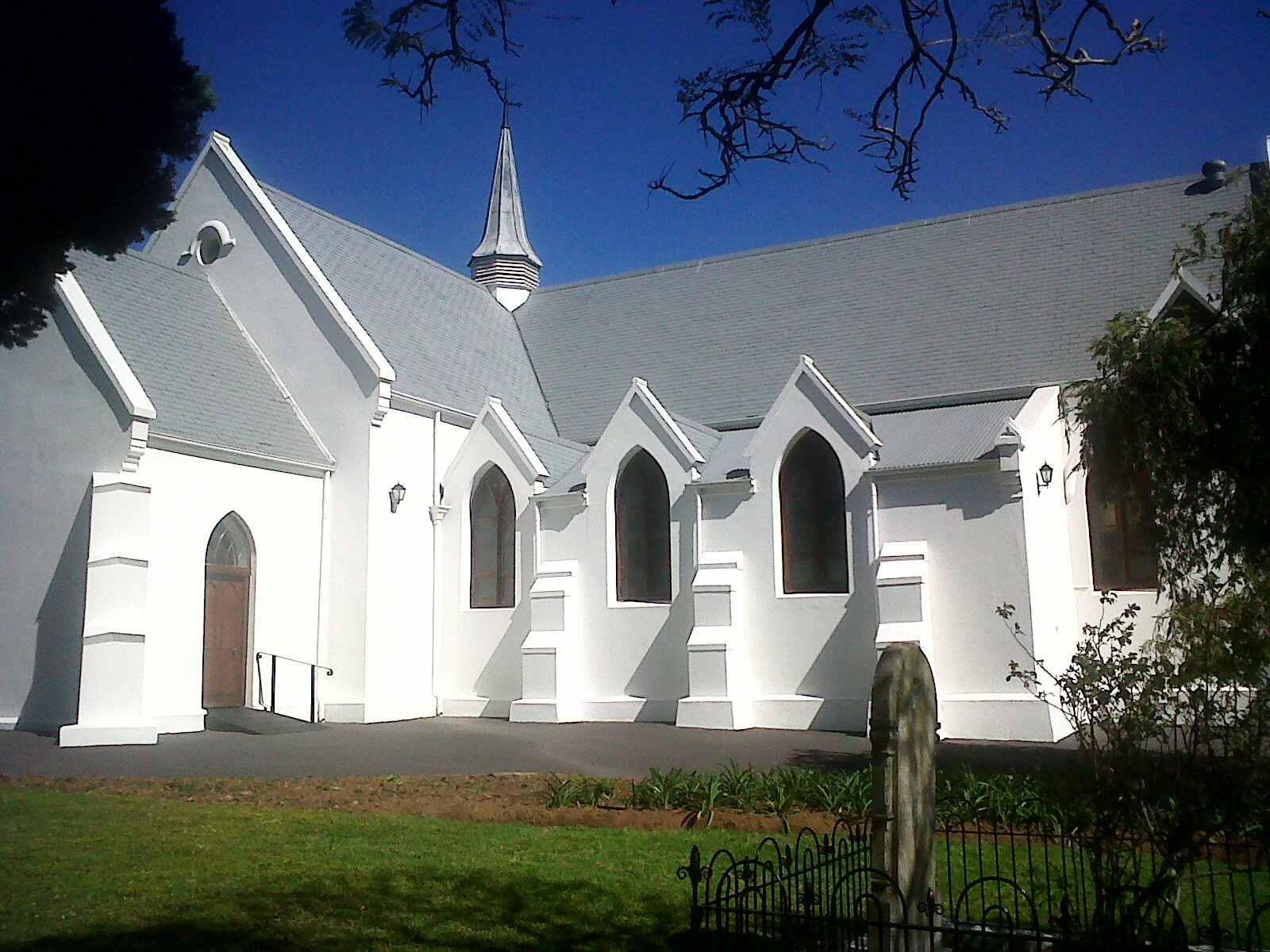

The Dutch Reformed Church in Durbanville is a church building of the Dutch Reformed Church in Durbanville, South Africa, built in 1825 in the Cape Dutch style. The village was then still called Pompoenkraal. A separate bell tower has been built near the church with a bell visible from the outside. The church was enlarged in 1891. The building was restored and rededicated in 1957. The community of Durbanville has grown rapidly, especially in the 20th century.

== Ministers ==
- Johannes Jacobus Beck, 1834–1886
- Daniel Bosman, 1904–1928
- Petrus Jacobus van der Merwe, 1926–1941
- Stephanus Salomon Weyers, 1942–1948
- Hendrik Vrede van Huyssteen, 1942–1944
- Josua Joubert de Villiers, 1944–1967
- Elias Jacobus Matthee, 1948–1956
- Johannes Mattheus Delport, 1963–1969
- Fredrick Johannes Conradie, 1969–1973
