= Zanne Stapelberg =

South African musician

Personal details
- Born: Zanne Stapelberg; 12 August 1977 Bellville, Western Cape, South Africa
- Spouse: Johannes Frederick de Lange
- Education: Durbanville High School, Stellenbosch University
- Known for: Opera singer

Zanne Stapelberg (12 August 1977) is a South African musician.

== Biography ==
Zanne Stapelberg was born in Bellville, in 1977, and grew up in the town of Durbanville. She matriculated on Durbanville High School.

=== Education ===
Stapelberg began her operatic training at the Conservatoire of Stellenbosch University (with Magdalena Oosthuizen) and graduated in 1998 with a degree in Music and English Literature. The university also awarded her with various academic achievement and singing bursaries. In 1999 she obtained her Higher Licentiate in Musical Performance Cum Laude.

=== Professional life ===
In 2000, Stapelberg became a member of the Cape Town Opera Studio. In 2001 she received the Best Young Opera Singer Award from the Cape Town Friends of the Opera.

Operatic roles include Angelica in Suor Angelica, Mimì in Puccini's La bohème, Nella in Gianni Schicchi, Ilia in Mozart's, Idomeneo, Marguerite in Gounod's, Faust, Handel's Alcina, and Pamina in Mozart's Die Zauberflöte.

Her oratorio repertoire includes Handel's Messiah, Vivaldi's Gloria, Haydn's Die Schöpfung, Mozart's Dixit Dominus and Requiem, Brahms' Ein Deutsches Requiem, Dvořák's Requiem, Carla in William Kentridge's Confessions of Zeno, composed by Kevin Volans, as well as the Aqua Opera at the Victoria & Alfred Waterfront in 2003 and 2004.

Other stage performances include Marthinus Basson's staging of Stravinsky's Pulcinella.

Stapelberg has collaborated with South African composer Hendrik Hofmeyr, on his Byzantium for soprano and orchestra, The Death of Cleopatra and various of his song cycles. One of them, Die Stil Avontuur, comprising settings of works by South African poet, Elisabeth Eybers, was composed specifically for Stapelberg's voice.

She received the Kanna Award for Best Classical Production in 2014 at the Klein Karoo National Arts Festival, together with the Odeion String Quartet.

Apart from her operatic and concert performances, Stapelberg is also involved in various creative stage projects with her company Long Tall Women Productions; in 2006 she launched her opera-cabaret, Zanne.

=== Discography ===
- Soul of Fire (2012)
- Zanne Stapelberg Opera Gala (2013)
