= Amore Bekker =

South African radio personality and writer

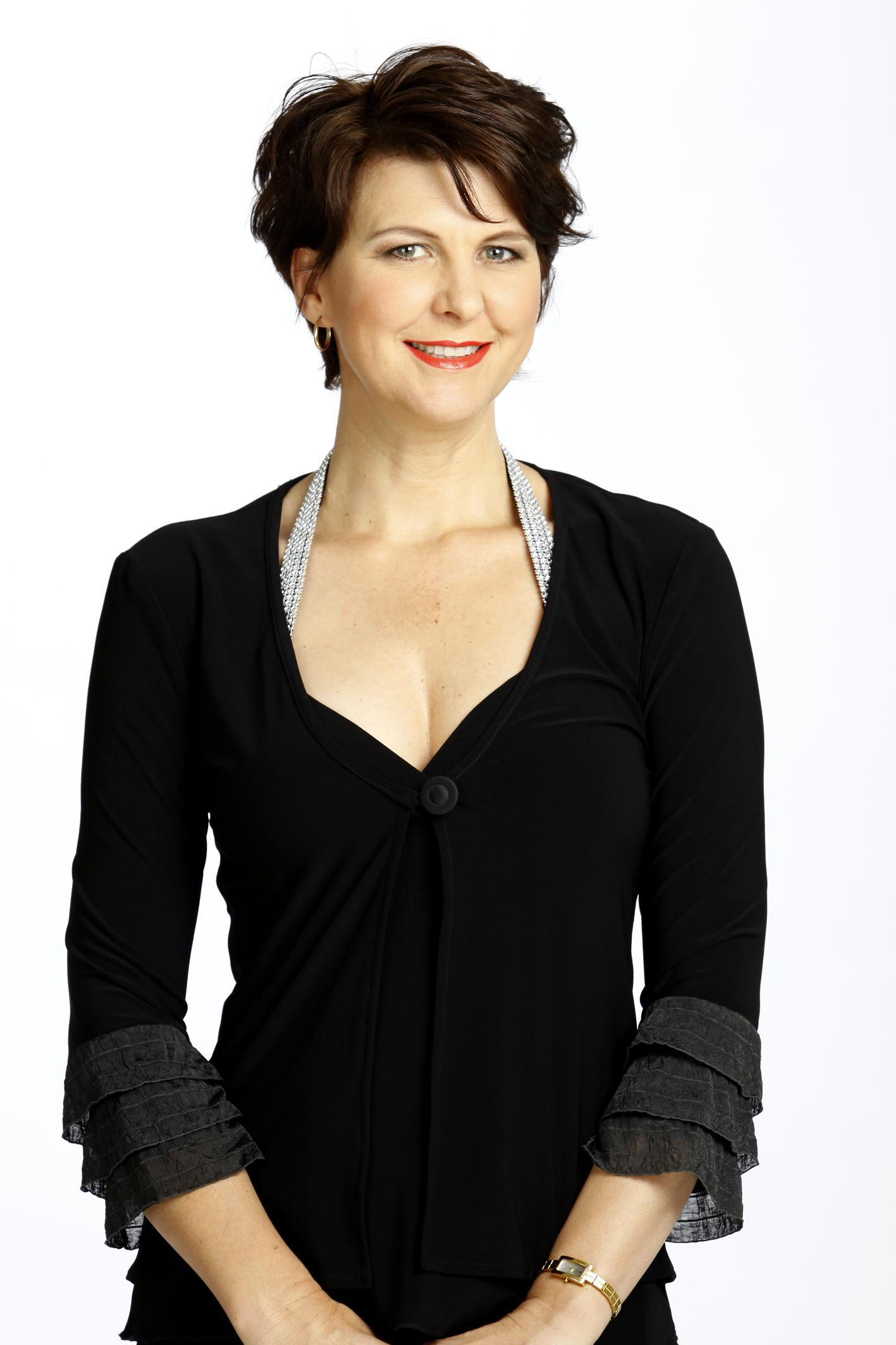
- Born: Hetta Amor Bekker; 11 February 1965 (age 61); Burgersdorp, Cape Province, South Africa
- Education: Durbanville High School, Potchefstroom University for Christian Higher Education
- Occupations: Radio personality, author and columnist.
- Years active: 1989–present

Hetta Amor “Amore” Bekker (born 11 February 1965) is a South African radio personality, author, MC and columnist. She was the host of Tjailatyd, an Afrikaans radio show broadcast by Radio Sonder Grense (RSG), the Afrikaans language Radio Service of the SABC. As an author, Bekker published her first cookbook (Tjailaresepte) in June 2010. As of July 2010 she also writes a column for the Afrikaans-language women's magazine Finesse.

== Early life ==
Bekker was born on 11 February 1965, in Burgersdorp, the daughter of Iwan Carl Horak and Amor Hester Dreyer. The middle child of three, Bekker grew up in Durbanville, Western Cape, a middle-class residential town of the greater City of Cape Town metropolitan area. Bekker attended Kenridge Primary School in Bellville, Western Cape and Durbanville High School before completing a Bachelor's degree in Drama at the Potchefstroom University for Christian Higher Education in 1986.

Prior to taking her first job as radio presenter, she worked as a sheep shearer for three months in the Southland town of Otautau, New Zealand, in early 1989.

== Radio career ==
In the later part of 1989, Amore started working as a DJ for Algoa FM, and later moved on to Good Hope FM, 94.5 Kfm and Radio Rippel. She took a job with the SABC in 2003 as the host of the Saturday morning breakfast show, Brêkfis met Bekker. She was later replaced by Derrick Gardner and became the host of Tjailatyd, the afternoon drive show, after which she became the presenter of the Monday to Friday morning show, alhoebekker.

== Awards ==
- 2007 ATKV-mediaveertjie (media-feather) in the category best Afrikaans radio presenter (for Tjailatyd).
- 2009 ATKV-mediaveertjie (media-feather) in the category best Afrikaans radio presenter (for Tjailatyd).
- 2009 ATKV-mediaveertjie (media-feather) in the category best Afrikaans radio interview for her interview with Emeritus Archbishop Desmond Tutu.
- 2011 ATKV-mediaveertjie (media-feather) in the category best insert in a radio program for her "Bottels vir Beaufort" project.

== Kruie kraai koning ==
Translated from the Afrikaans: "Herbs rule." The phrase plays on the old Afrikaans saying that herbs are natures cure for every and any ailment.

Antoinette Pienaar (well known Afrikaans actress and singer) and Oom (uncle) Johannes Willemse (a Griqua shaman in his late nineties) are regulars on Bekker's afternoon drive show (Tjailatyd) and answer listeners' questions on a weekly basis from location in the heart of the Great Karoo of South Africa.

Pienaar and Willemse were introduced to the greater Afrikaans community by Bekker while she was still presenting Brêkvis met Bekker and gave them a regular slot on the then Saturday morning breakfast show.

In Bekker's own words: "Antoinette Pienaar came into my life during the 1990s. Her Karoo personality captivated me and I felt…the people must hear this woman! They hit the RSG air waves in 2003 and has gone from strength to strength ever since."

Pienaar received great acclaim in the Afrikaans community thanks to the efforts of Bekker and RSG with this program. Pienaar's book, Kruidjie roer my / The Griqua's Apprentice, on folk remedies from the Griqua and Afrikaner (Boer) communities was published with the help of RSG.

== Tjaila Resepte (2010) ==
Translated from the Afrikaans: "Going home recipes".

Tjaila Resepte is Bekker's first book; a compilation of recipes phoned in by listeners of her afternoon drive show. A book centered around the theme of easy modern Afrikaans cooking and old family favorites. It starts with a section on puddings/deserts, "because life is unsure" – a quote she "borrowed" from the writer Ernestine Ulmer. According to Bekker her number one purpose in life is to eat like a royal and enjoy good companionship every day. The book is dedicated to her deceased life partner Dr. Robbie Nutt and was published with the help of RSG.

== Personal life ==
Rian van Heerden had an interview with her in 2007 on the Rian show, in which she revealed that she was involved with a Greek business man many years ago and that she almost emigrated to Greece. When asked why she did not, she said: "Because I felt it in my water" – a characteristic phrase used by Bekker when discussing spiritual decisions or beliefs. This deep belief in God can also be seen in her reaction to Dr. Robert (Robbie) Nutt's death on 13 December 2009 (he was born on 30 September 1963) which was widely publicized in the Afrikaans media. In May 2010, Sarie had an exclusive interview with her regarding his death.

She is studying towards a degree in psychology at the University of South Africa (UNISA) in her spare time.
