= Mireille Wenger =

South African politician (born 1980)

Mireille Wenger MPP

Western Cape Provincial Minister of Health and Wellness
- Incumbent
- Assumed office 13 June 2024
- Premier: Alan Winde
- Preceded by: Nomafrench Mbombo

Western Cape Provincial Minister of Finance and Economic Opportunities
- In office 16 May 2022 – 13 June 2024
- Premier: Alan Winde
- Preceded by: David Maynier
- Succeeded by: Deidré Baartman

Chief Whip of the Majority Party
- In office 22 May 2019 – 16 May 2022
- Premier: Alan Winde
- Preceded by: Mark Wiley
- Succeeded by: Lorraine Botha

Member of the Western Cape Provincial Parliament
- Incumbent
- Assumed office 21 May 2014

Personal details
- Born: Mireille Mary Wenger; 1 June 1980 (age 46)
- Party: Democratic Alliance
- Spouse: Craig Kesson
- Children: 1
- Education: University of Cape Town (MPhil); Stellenbosch University (MA)
- Profession: Politician

Mireille Mary Wenger (born 1 June 1980) is a South African politician who is serving as the Western Cape Provincial Minister of Health and Wellness since June 2024. A member of the Democratic Alliance (DA), she has been a Member of the Western Cape Provincial Parliament since May 2014. She previously served as the DA's Chief Whip from 2019 to 2022 and Provincial Minister of Finance and Economic Opportunities from 2022 to 2024.

== Qualifications ==
Wenger holds a Master of Arts in International Studies from Stellenbosch University and a Master of Philosophy (MPhil) in Criminology, Law and Society from the University of Cape Town. She obtained a diploma in Political Science and Sociology from Sciences Po in France.

== Political career ==
In 2014, she was elected to the Western Cape Provincial Parliament as a member of the Democratic Alliance. She took office as an MPP on 21 May 2014. Wenger was elected chairperson of the community safety committee.

After her re-election in 2019, she was appointed the chief whip of the DA caucus and consequently Chief Whip of the Majority Party. She assumed office on 22 May 2019. On 17 April 2022, Wenger was elected as the Chairperson of the Provincial Parliament's Ad-Hoc Committee on COVID-19.

On 22 April 2022, Premier Alan Winde announced that Wenger would be joining the provincial cabinet on 16 May 2022 as the Provincial Minister of Finance and Economic Opportunities as the incumbent Provincial Minister David Maynier would be moving to the Education portfolio to replace Debbie Schäfer, who announced her departure from the provincial government. The Provincial Parliament's Ad-Hoc Committee on COVID-19 disbanded on 10 May 2022. DA member Lorraine Botha replaced Wenger as Chief Whip of the Majority Party. Wenger was sworn into office on 16 May 2022.

Wenger was re-elected to the provincial parliament in the 2024 provincial election, which were won by the DA. After the election Wenger remained in cabinet, taking a new role as Minister of Health and Wellness.

== Personal life ==
Wenger is married to Craig Kesson. They have one child.
