= Johnny Trytsman =

South African rugby union player

- Born: John William Trytsman; 29 July 1971 (age 55) Bellville, Western Cape
- Height: 2.03 m (6 ft 8 in)
- Weight: 102 kg (225 lb)
- School: Durbanville High School
- University: Stellenbosch University

Rugby union career
- Position(s): Lock, Flank
Provincial / State sides
| Years | Team | Apps | (Points) |
| 1992–1994, 98–99 | Western Province | | |
| 1996–97 | Boland | 48 | |
Super Rugby
| Years | Team | Apps | (Points) |
| 1998–99 | Stormers | | |
International career
| Years | Team | Apps | (Points) |
| 1998 | South Africa | | |

John William Trytsman (born 29 July 1971) is a South African former rugby union player.

== Playing career ==
Trytsman matriculated at Durbanville High School and studied at the University of Stellenbosch, representing the Maties on the rugby field. He made his senior provincial debut for Western Province in 1992 and in 1996 moved to Boland. In 1998, he returned to Western Province and later that year was selected to tour with the Springboks to Britain and Ireland. Trytsman did not play in any test matches but played in four tour matches for the Springboks.

== See also ==
- List of South Africa national rugby union players – Springbok no. 680
