= Onze Molen =

Windmill in Cape Town, South Africa

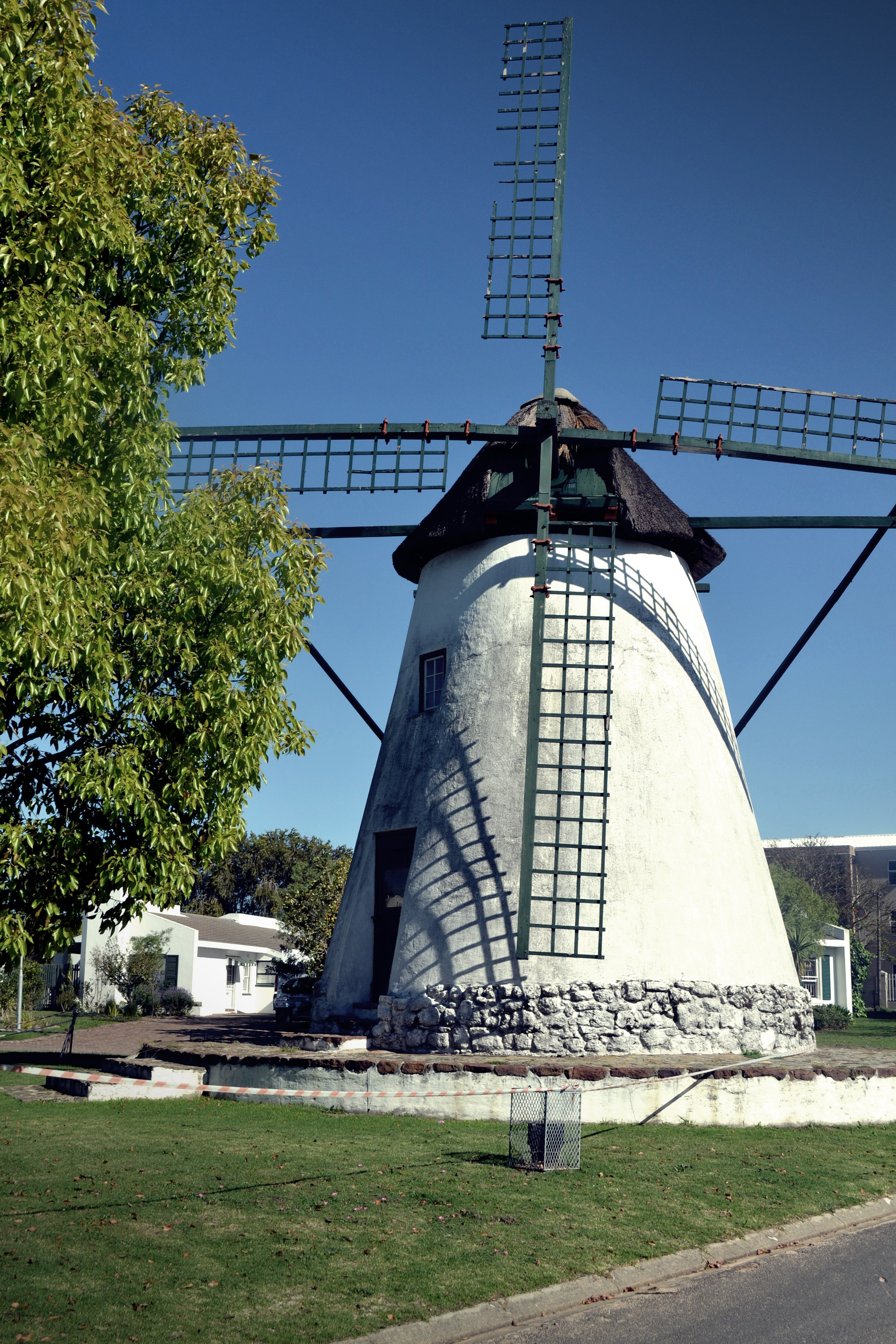

Origin
- Mill location: Durbanville, South Africa
- Coordinates: 33°56′24″S 18°29′23″E
- Year built: 1840

Information
- Type: Ground sailor

Onze Molen is a mill in Durbanville, South Africa. The mill was built between 1837 and 1842 at the Johannesfontein farm.

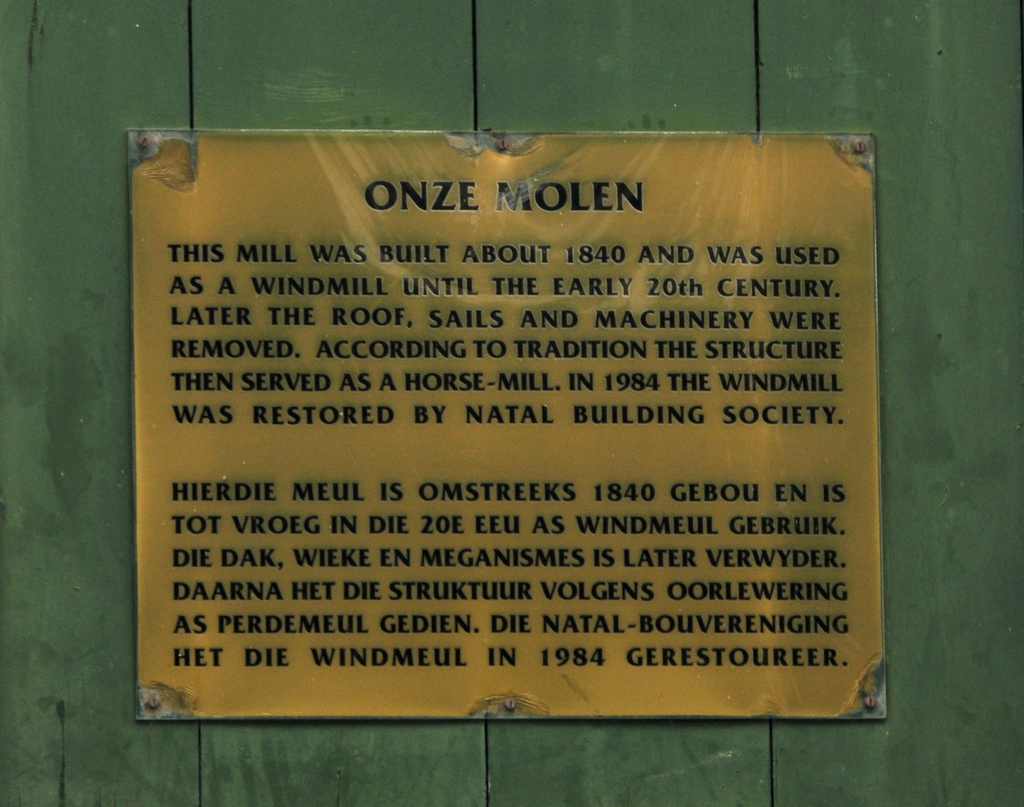
Plaque

In 1984 the mill was restored by the Natal Bouvereniging. A year earlier, the mill was added to the monument list. An article in the newspaper Die Burger of 4 May 1996 criticised the restoration as historically incorrect. A certain James Walton states that the restorers were after a copy of Mostert's Mill than on a restoration of the original. In 1999, a plan to get the mill working again was rejected. Locally, the mill is also known as Die Ou Meul. The Afrikaans word for mill is meul. Nevertheless, the building is called Onze Molen in official documents, after the original Dutch spelling.
