= Lorraine Botha =

South African politician (1965–2022)

Member of the Western Cape Provincial Parliament
- In office 21 May 2014 – 31 August 2022

Personal details
- Born: 2 July 1965
- Died: 31 August 2022 (aged 57)
- Party: Democratic Alliance
- Spouse: Johan Botha (died 2021)
- Profession: Politician

Lorraine Juliette Botha (2 July 1965 – 31 August 2022) was a South African politician. A member of the Democratic Alliance, she was a Member of the Western Cape Provincial Parliament from 2014 up to her death. Botha served as the chief whip of the DA caucus from May 2022 until her death in August 2022. She was the chairperson of the Standing Committee on Education from 2019 until 2022.

== Western Cape Provincial Parliament ==
Botha was a member of the Democratic Alliance. In May 2014, she was elected to the Western Cape Provincial Parliament. She was then elected chairperson of the department of the premier committee.

In 2016, she was elected chairperson of the standing committee on health and social development. Following her re-election in May 2019, Botha became chairperson of the standing committee on education.

On 12 May 2022, Botha was appointed the new chief whip of the DA caucus in the provincial parliament. She replaced Mireille Wenger, who was appointed to the Provincial Cabinet.

== Death ==
Botha suffered a heart attack and died after collapsing suddenly on Wednesday, 31 August 2022, while at work, according to the DA's provincial leader Tertuis Simmers. Her husband, Johan, died in January 2021.
