= Deidré Baartman =

South African politician (born 1991)

Deidré Baartman MPP
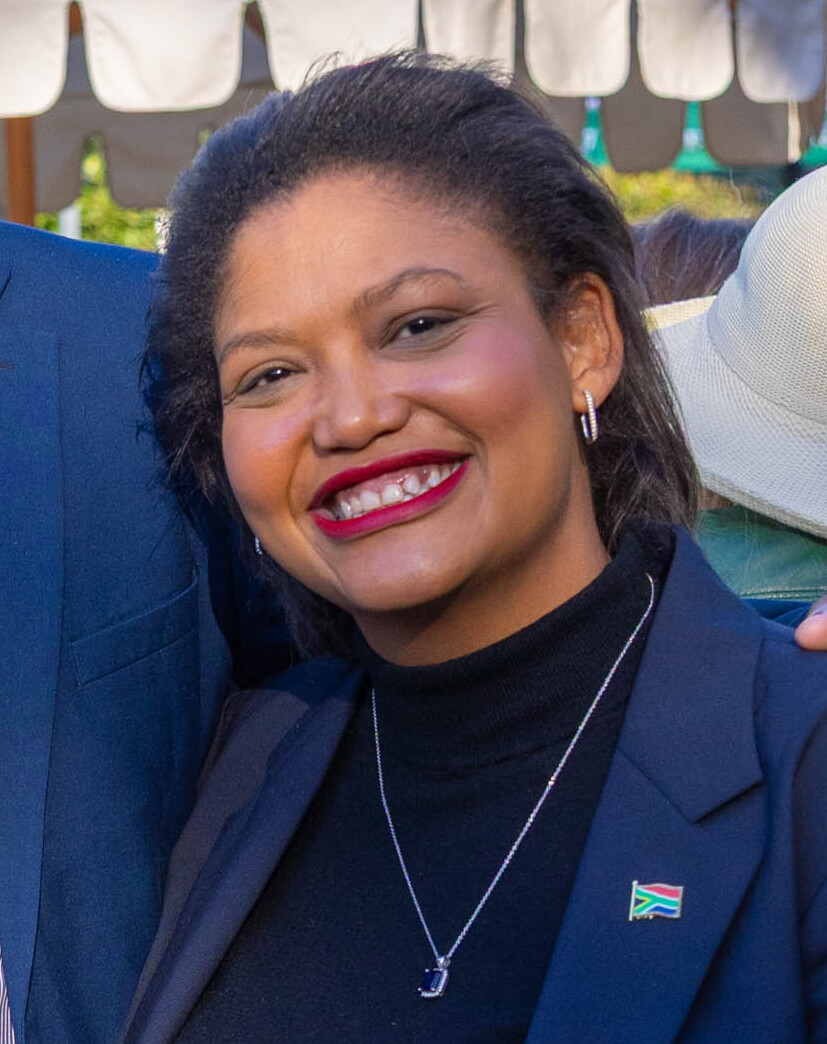
- Baartman in 2025

Western Cape Provincial Minister of Finance
- Incumbent
- Assumed office 13 June 2024
- Premier: Alan Winde
- Preceded by: Mireille Wenger

Member of the Western Cape Provincial Parliament
- Incumbent
- Assumed office 22 May 2019

Personal details
- Born: 7 February 1991 (age 35)
- Party: Democratic Alliance
- Occupation: Politician

Deidré Maudelene Baartman (born 7 February 1991) is a South African politician who is serving as the Western Cape's Provincial Minister of Finance since June 2024. A member of the Democratic Alliance (DA), she has been a member of the Western Cape Provincial Parliament since May 2019. She previously served as the Deputy Chief Whip of the Western Cape Provincial Parliament and the Chairperson of both the Budget Committee and the Standing Committee on Finance, Economic Opportunities and Tourism.

== Life and career ==
Baartman obtained her LLB and LLM (Public Procurement Law) from the University of Stellenbosch. She was admitted as an advocate of the Western Cape High Court in 2017. Prior to being elected, she worked as a political assistant to the Democratic Alliance's National Assembly Chief Whip, John Steenhuisen.

Baartman took office as a Member of the Western Cape Provincial Parliament in May 2019. She was elected Chairperson of both the Standing Committee on Finance, Economic Opportunities and Tourism and the Budget Committee. In 2021, she was appointed Deputy Chief Whip of the Western Cape Provincial Parliament. Baartman was re-elected for a second term in the Provincial Parliament in the 2024 provincial election. On 13 June 2024, at the age of 33, she was appointed as the Provincial Minister of Finance by premier Alan Winde. She is the youngest Minister appointed in Western Cape history.
