= Groot Phesantekraal View =

Shopping centre in Durbanville, South Africa

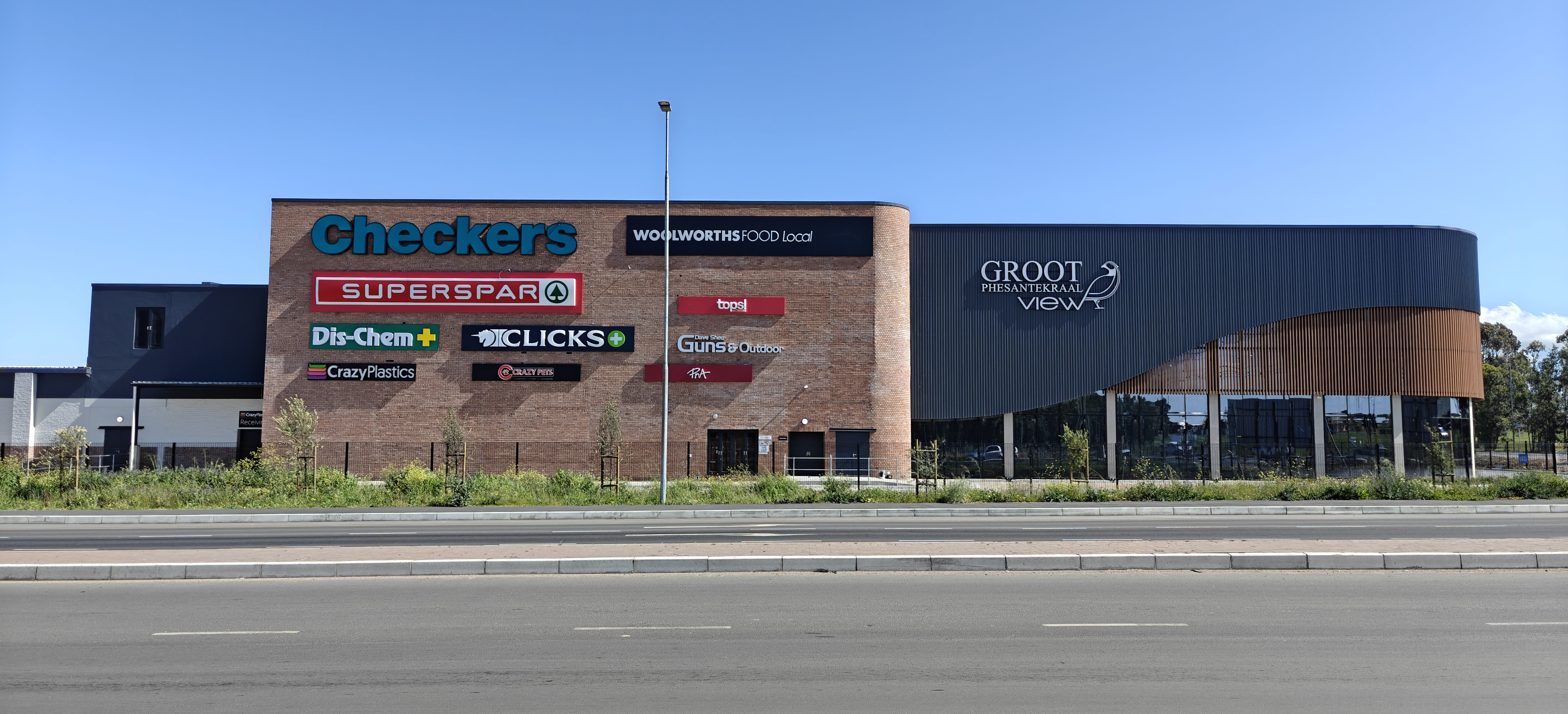
- Side of the shopping centre
- Interactive map of the Groot Phesantekraal View area

General information
- Type: Community shopping center
- Architectural style: Contemporary
- Location: Corner of Klipheuwel and Okavango Roads, Durbanville, City of Cape Town, South Africa
- Coordinates: 33.8002386°S 18.6867926°E
- Current tenants: Woolworths, Checkers, MRP, Spar, among others
- Opening: 24 July 2025; 12 months ago
- Cost: ~ R1 billion

Technical details
- Floor count: 2
- Floor area: 30,000 m^{2} (320,000 sq ft)

Design and construction
- Structural engineer: Spire
- Main contractor: Abland (Property developer)

Other information
- Number of stores: 40+

Website
- www.grootphesantekraalview.co.za

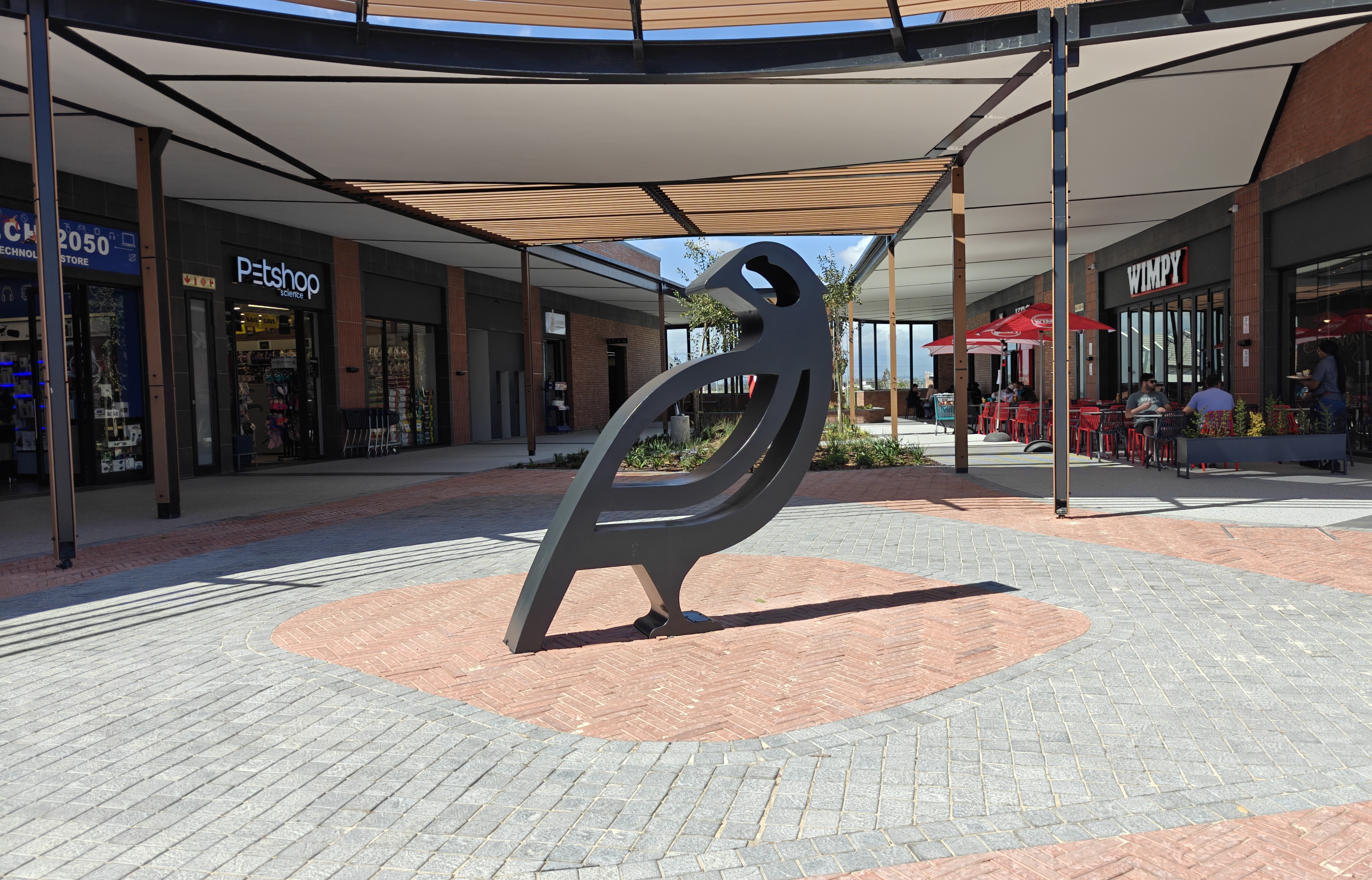
Pheasant art installation in one of the center's courtyards

Groot Phesantekraal View is a shopping centre located in the town of Durbanville, in the City of Cape Town metro, South Africa. It is part of the Groot Phesantekraal Precinct, a mixed-use development on old farmland in the north of the town.

Opened in July 2025, the centre features over 40 stores, spread across 30,000 square meters of retail space.

== History ==
Phesantekraal opened in July 2025. The mall, situated at the gateway to the Cape Winelands region, is named in accordance with the Groot Phesantekraal farmland on which it is built. The working farm, operated by the Brink family, was opened in 1698. The mall's logo features a pheasant.

Once operational, the centre was expected to draw in customers from surrounding regions, not just consumers residing in the Cape Winelands. The development was also expected to increase local property demand, and contribute towards the establishment of Durbanville as an economic hub within the Western Cape.

The development cost of the centre was approximately R1 billion.

== Features ==
Groot Phesantekraal View was designed with inspiration from the centre’s surrounding natural beauty and historic farmlands.

The shopping centre has 30,000 square meters of retail space, and is classed as a community shopping centre - the largest category of such retail buildings in South Africa.

The centre is home to over 40 stores. Categories of retail and services offered at Phesantekraal include groceries, restaurants, personal care, pet supplies, hair stylists, fitness, postage, stationery, clothing, and homeware.

Anchor tenants include Woolworths, Checkers, MRP, and Spar.

Groot Phesantekraal View Shopping Centre
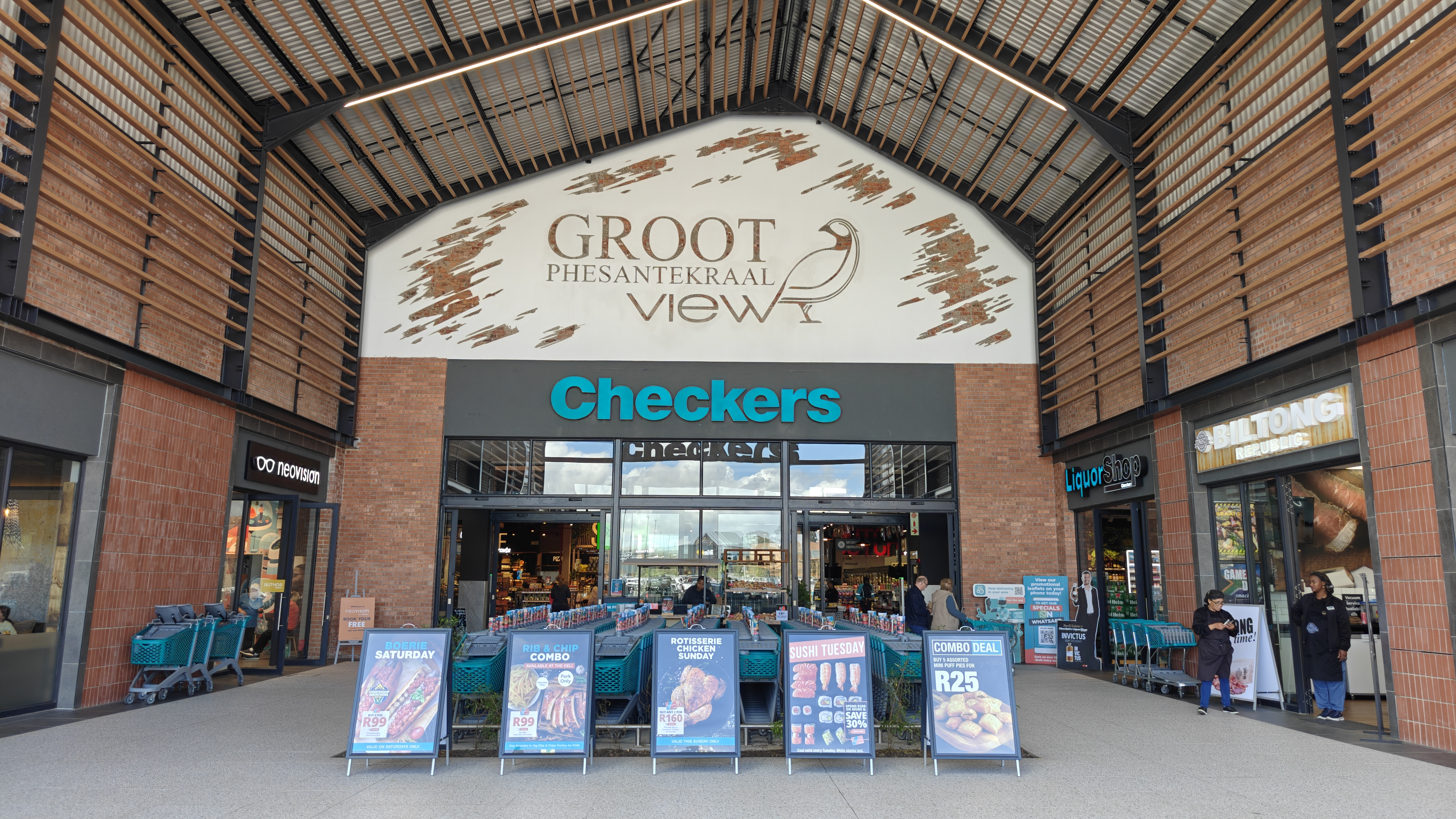
Checkers entrance

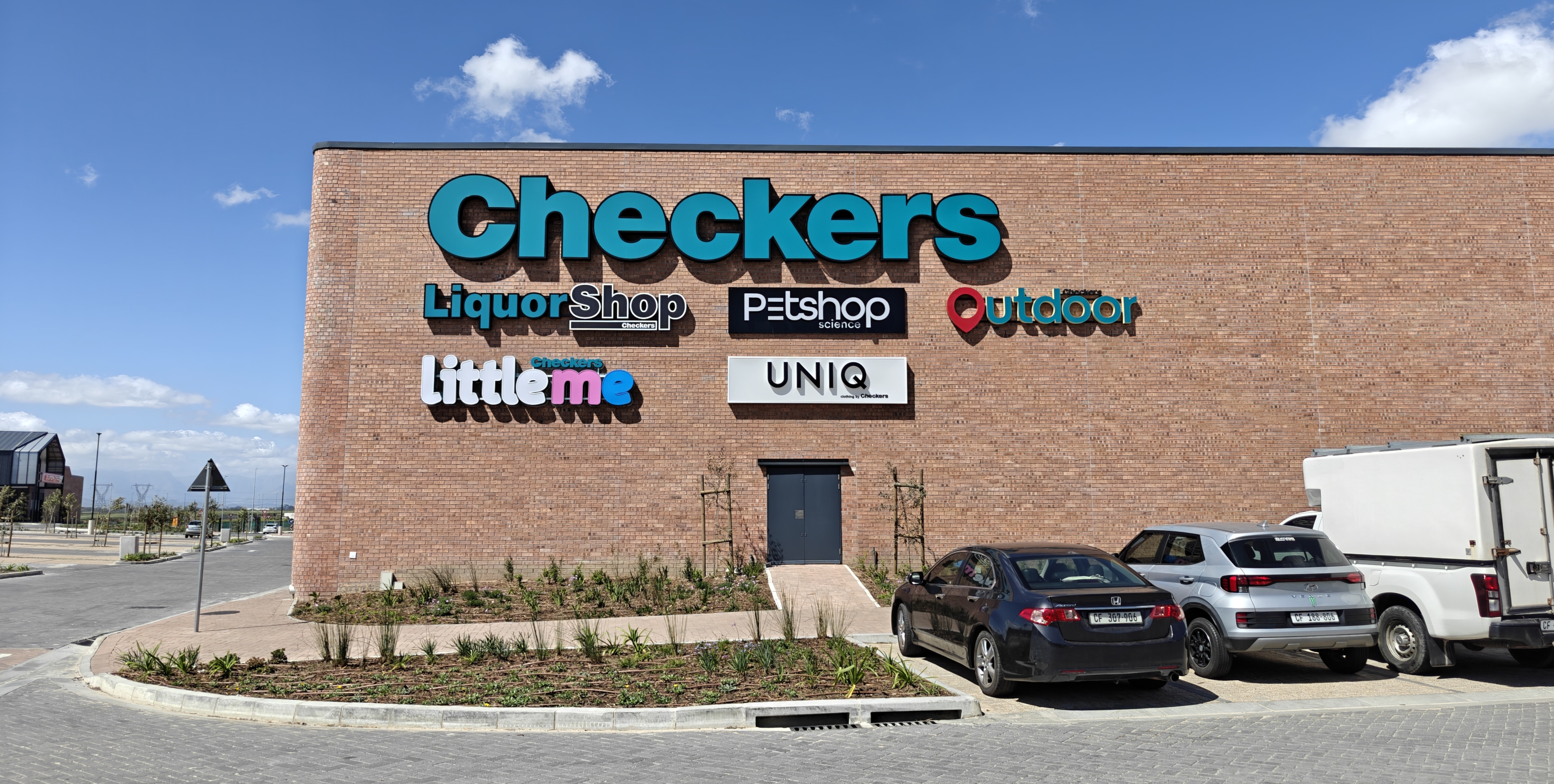
Signage for various Checkers store brands

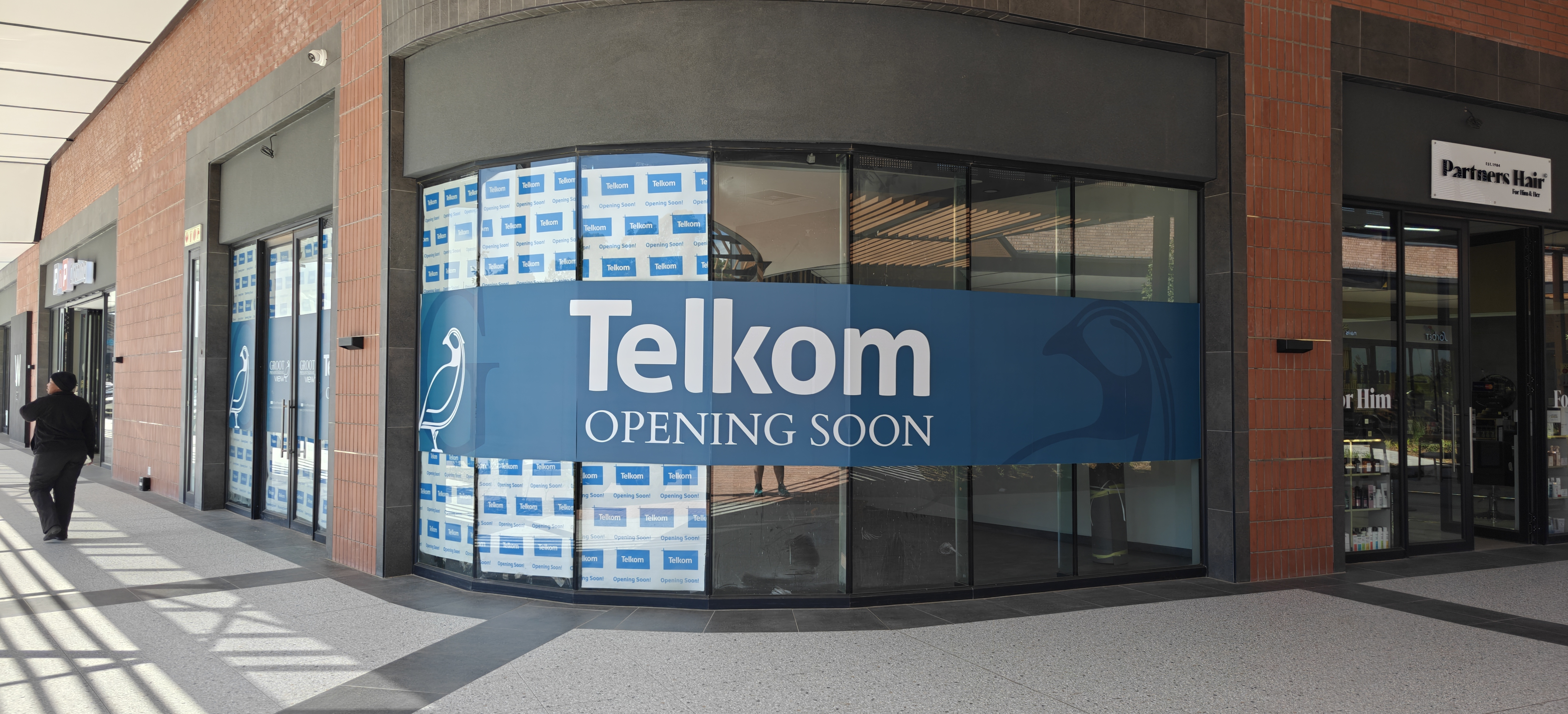
Future Telkom store

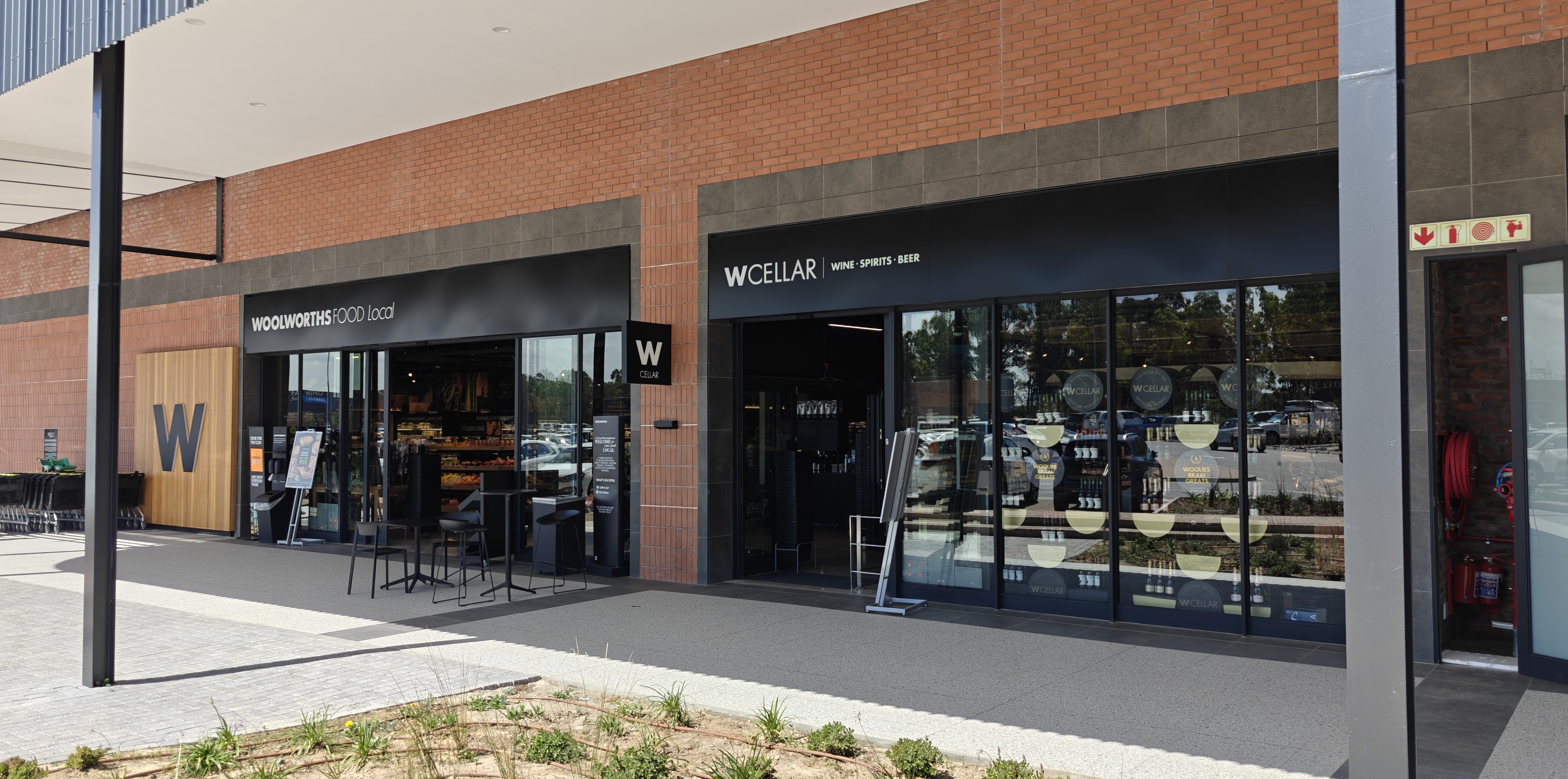
Woolworths (South Africa) Food and WCellar stores

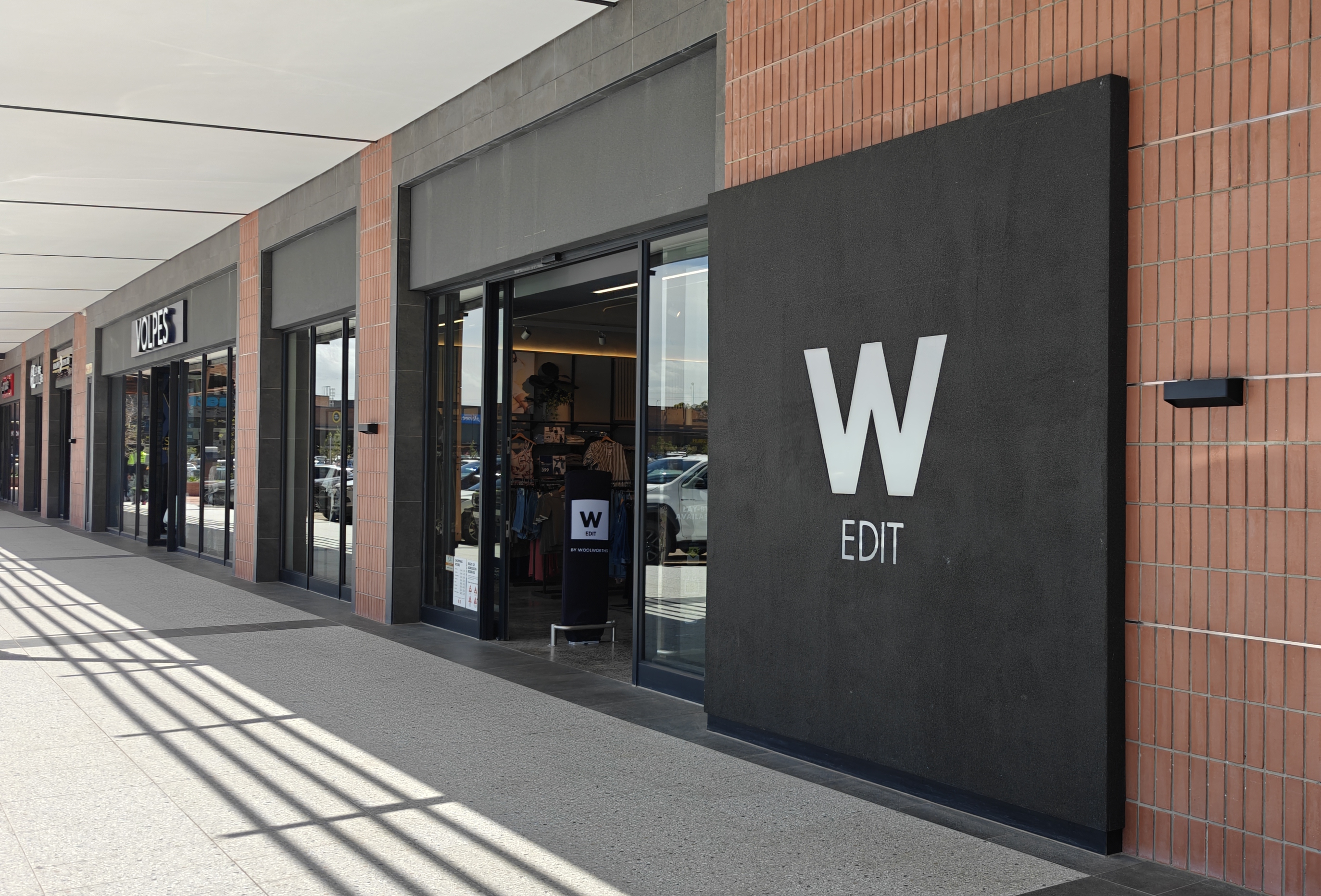
Woolworths Edit store

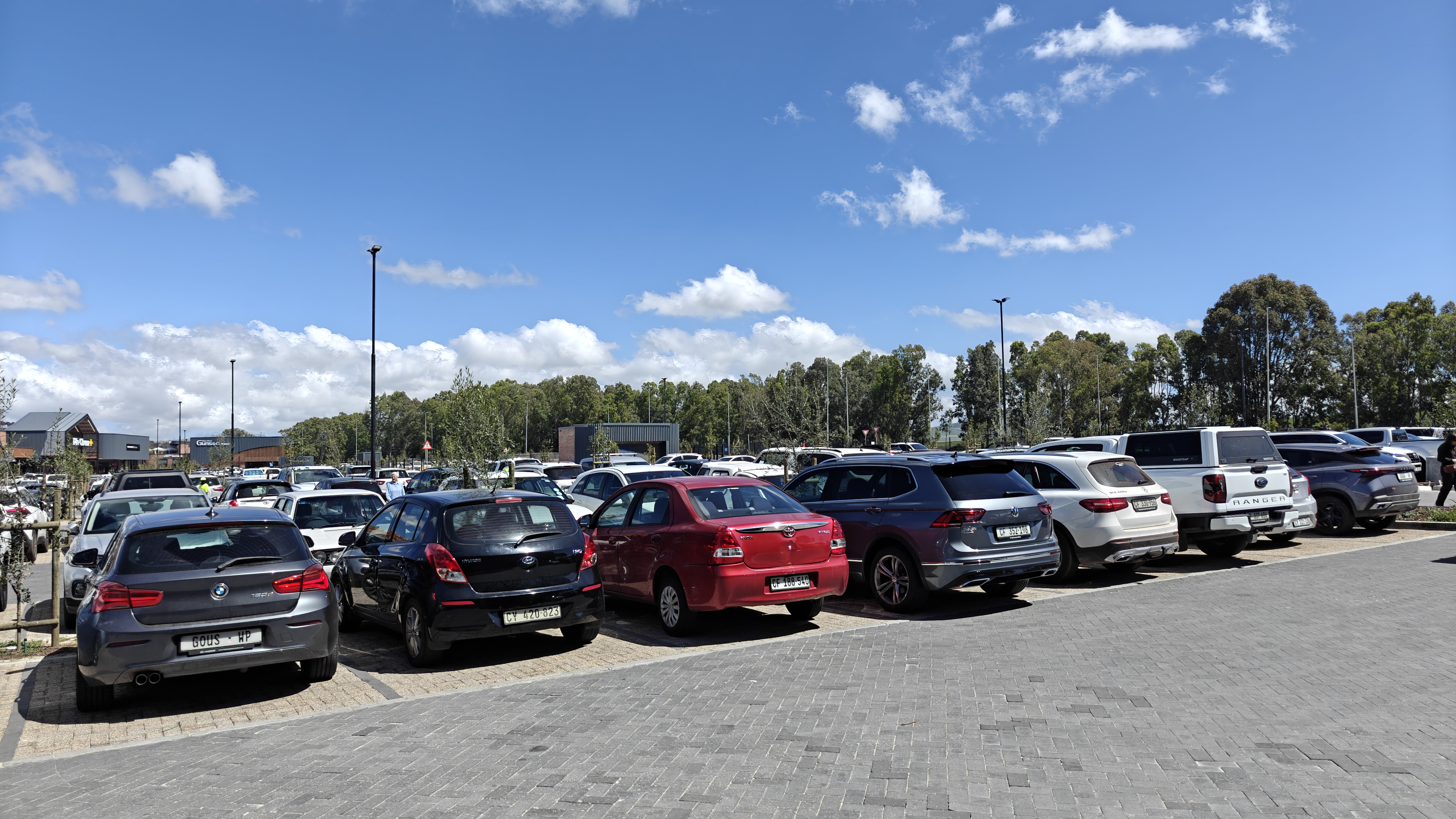
Surface level parking in front of the centre
