= Mostert's Mill =

Historic windmill in Cape Town, South Africa

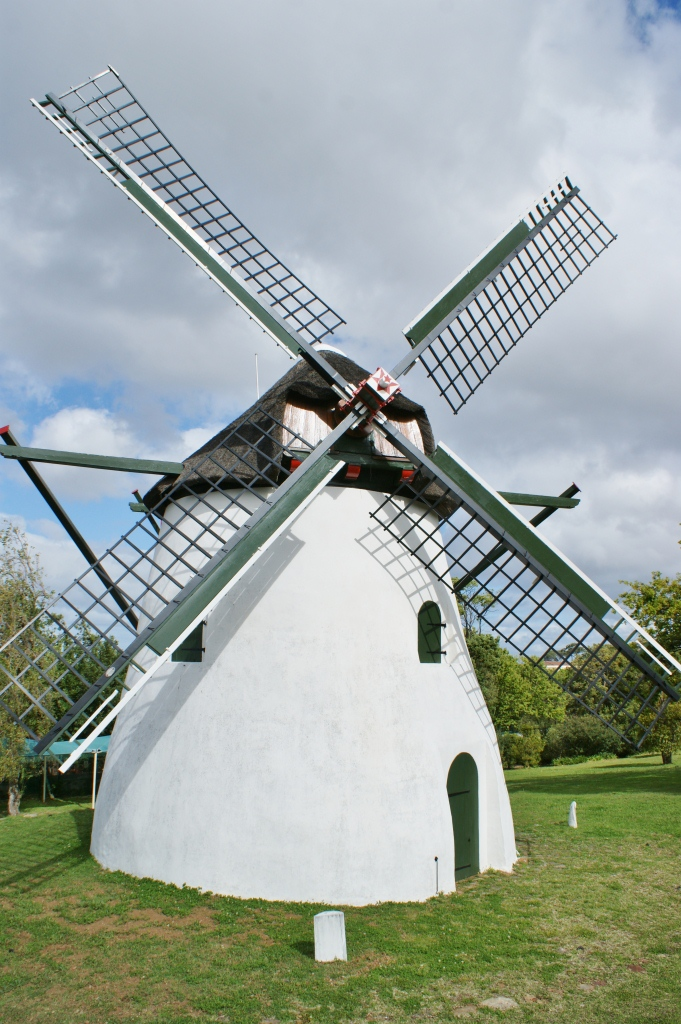
- Mostert's Mill, September 2012
- Interactive map of Mostert's Mill

Origin
- Mill name: Mostert's Mill
- Coordinates: 33°57′08″S 18°27′58″E
- Operator: Friends of Mostert's Mill
- Year built: 1796

Information
- Purpose: Corn mill
- Type: Tower mill
- Storeys: Three
- No. of sails: Four
- Type of sails: Common sails
- Windshaft: Wood, with cast iron poll end
- Winding: Tailpole

Mostert's Mill (Afrikaans: Mostert se Meul) is a historic windmill in Mowbray, Cape Town, South Africa. It was built in 1796 and is the oldest surviving complete windmill in South Africa. It was almost completely destroyed by a wildfire on 18 April 2021 but was fully restored by April 2024 and is once more operational and used to grind wheat into whole meal, using the power of the wind. The oldest windmill in South Africa is the De Nieuwe Molen mill in Cape Town, built in 1782.

== History ==
The mill was built around 1796 as a private mill on the farm 'Welgelegen', owned by Gysbert van Renen and was named after his son-in-law, Sybrand Mostert, after Van Renen's death. It was the first privately owned mill in Cape Town, Cape Colony. Prior to the British occupation of the Cape in the Battle of Muizenberg in 1795, only mills controlled by the Dutch East India Company were allowed. Mostert's Mill had ceased working by 1873 but was owned by the Mostert family until 1889, when it was sold to a Mr Wilks, who sold it in 1891 to Cecil Rhodes. The mill became derelict but a restoration was undertaken by the Dutch millwright Christiaan Bremer. The restored mill was opened on 1 February 1936 by Dr Lorentz, the Minister Plenipotentiary and Envoy Extraordinary to the Netherlands. The ceremony was attended by the Prime Minister, General Hertzog, and flour was ground for the guests.

The mill was worked on occasion but it again became derelict during the Second World War. In 1986, the windshaft broke and the sails crashed to the ground. The Vernacular Architecture Society of South Africa started a campaign to preserve the mill, leading to the formation of the Friends of Mostert's Mill in 1993. A further restoration in 1995 by Dunning-Bremer (who restored the mill in 1935) returned the mill to working order again at a cost of R245,000.

On 18 April 2021, the mill was gutted in a fire that had started on Table Mountain and destroyed several buildings, including one of the libraries of the University of Cape Town. The fire also destroyed four thatched houses behind the mill. At the time of the fire, Mostert's Mill was South Africa's oldest working mill.

By March 2023, it was reported that the mill had been almost completely restored following the fire of April 2021. The restoration had been undertaken by the Friends of Mostert's Mill, a non-profit organisation.

== Description ==
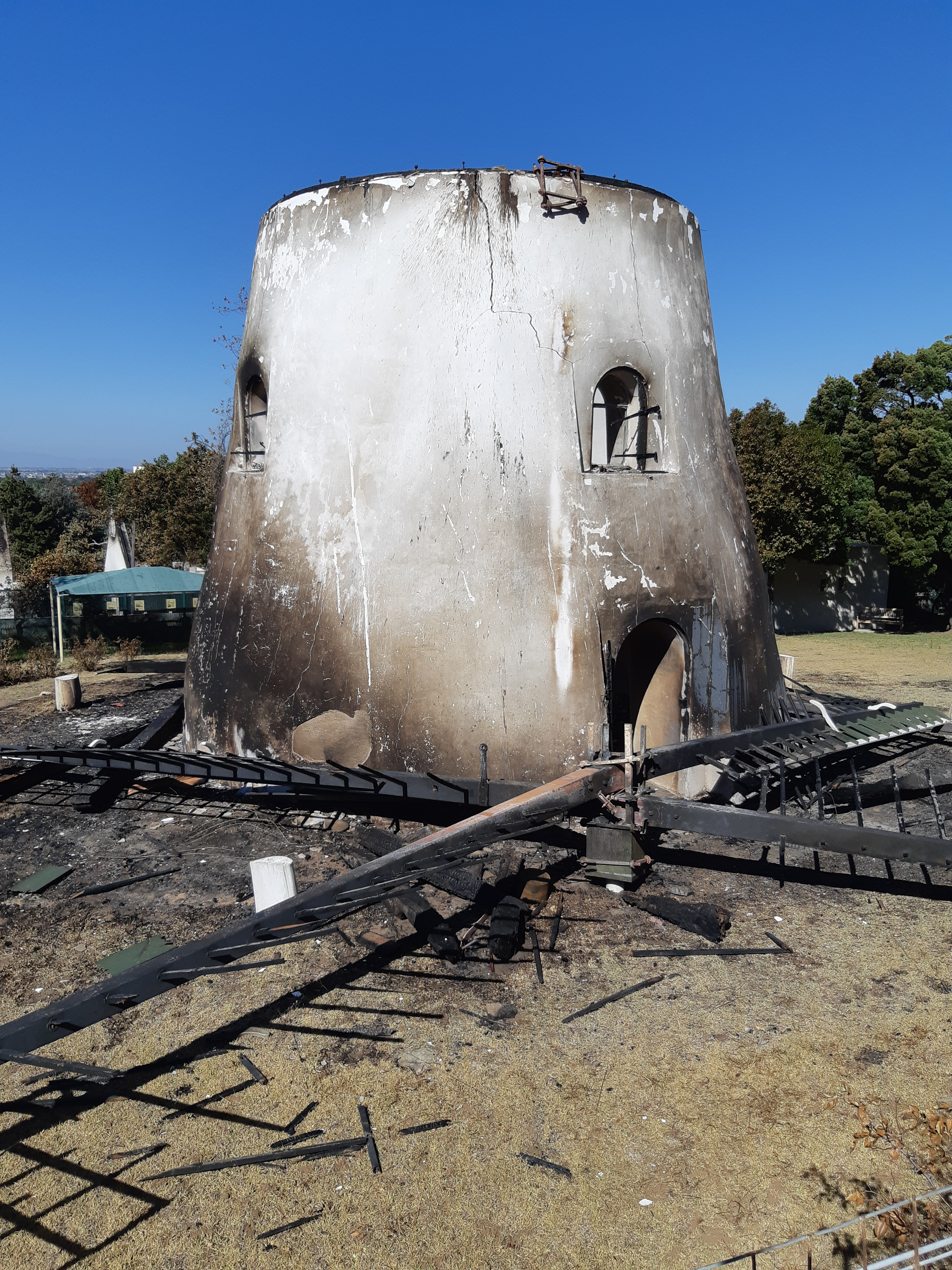
Burnt-out ruin of Mostert's Mill following the 2021 Table Mountain Fire

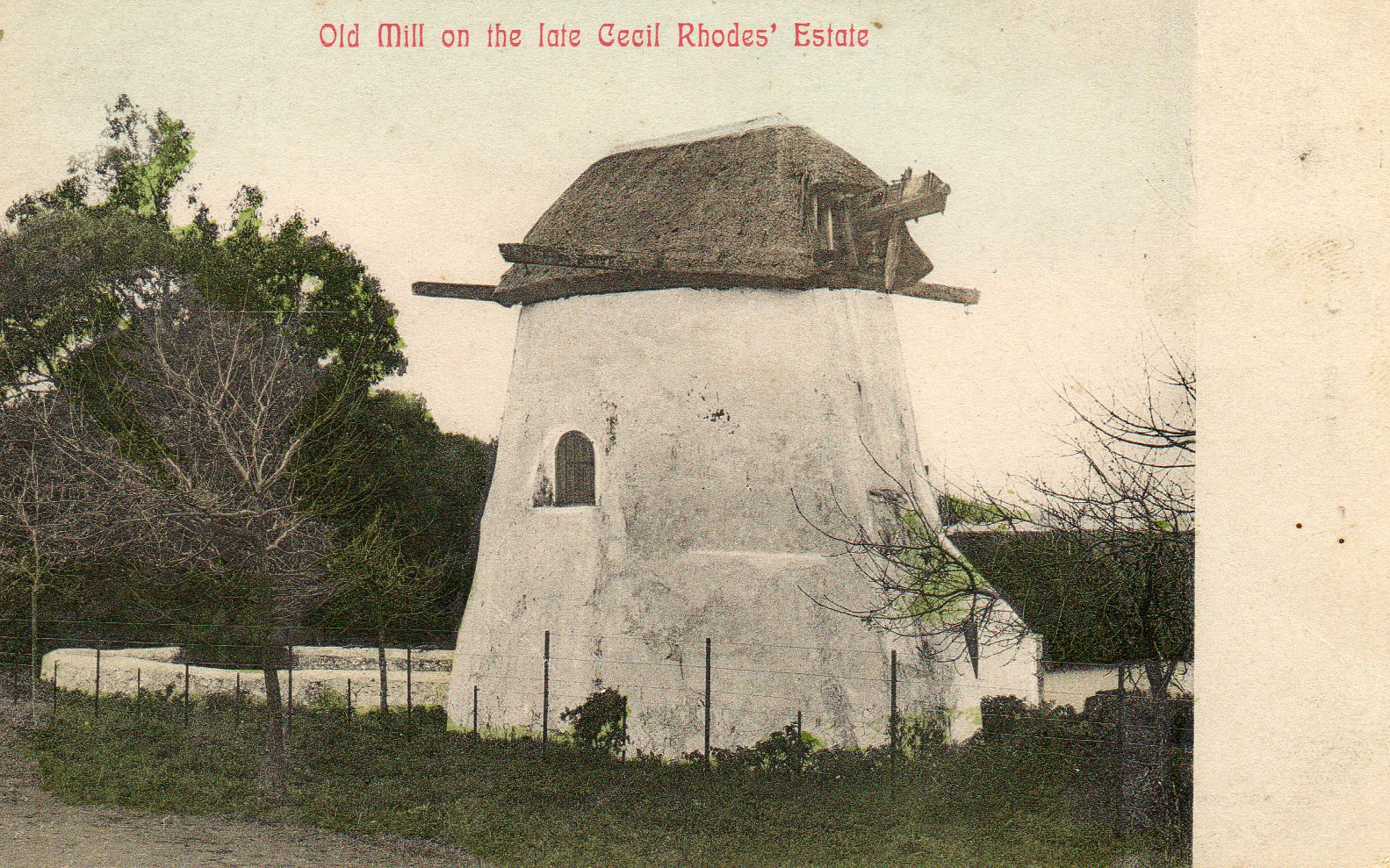
Mostert's Mill in the 1900s, showing the original wooden poll end on the windshaft

Mostert's Mill is a three-storey tower mill. The tower is 7.94 metres (26 ft 1 in) in diameter externally at ground level and 6.68 metres (21 ft 11 in) high. It was constructed of random stone for the first 2.28 metres (7 ft 6 in) and then unbaked bricks above. The walls are 1.15 metres (3 ft 9 in) thick at ground level, giving the mill an internal diameter of 5.64 metres (18 ft 6 in).

Before the 2021 fire, the cap was of a truncated cone shape and covered by thatch. The mill had four common sails and was winded by a tailpole. The four, modern, common sails followed the Dutch tradition, as there was no surviving sail to copy when Bremer restored the mill in 1935. Those fitted at the 1935 restoration were 6.00 metres (19 ft 8 in) long and 1.75 metres (5 ft 9 in) wide, fitted with a windboard on the leading edge. Such a feature was not to be found on other South African windmills. The sails, which had a span of 14.45 metres (47 ft 5 in), were carried on a teak windshaft. This was fitted with a cast iron poll end in 1935, because the terminus of the wooden shaft had rotted. Contemporary South African windmills all had wooden windshafts, apart from one of the Salt River windmills, which had an iron cross. A replacement windshaft made of iroko was fitted in 1995. The windshaft carried a clasp arm brake wheel, which had a diameter of 770 millimetres (2 ft 6 in) and had 47 cogs. It drove the single pair of millstones, via a lantern pinion stone nut, which had 16 staves. The millstones comprised the original runner stone and a non-original bedstone. The latter was a Cullen stone installed in 1935 and came from a windmill at Leens, Groningen, Netherlands.

== Location and access ==
Mostert's Mill is situated on the M3 close to the University of Cape Town on the slopes of Devil's Peak where it was a prominent landmark. The Friends of Mostert's Mill operated the mill and it was open to the public on one Saturday a month between 10:00 and 14:30.

== Sources ==
- Walton, James (1974). Water-mills windmills and horse mills of South Africa. Cape Town and Johannesburg: C Struik. ISBN 0-86977-040-3.
