= Antoinette Pienaar =

South African actress, singer, and author

- Born: Antoinette Pienaar; 1961 (age 64–65); Carnarvon, Northern Cape, Republic of South Africa
- Education: University of Cape Town; University of Stellenbosch
- Occupations: Actress, author and singer.
- Years active: 1986–present

Antoinette Pienaar (born 1961) is a South African actress, singer, and author.

== Early life ==
One of five sisters, Antoinette Pienaar was born in Beaufort West, grew up in Carnavon and studied drama at the University of Stellenbosch and the University of Cape Town.

== Career ==
She started her acting career in Shakespearean productions and later turned to singing, writing and storytelling, performing her gentle satires at the National Arts Festivals of Grahamstown, Oudshoorn and other Southern African theaters. As storyteller she is best known for her stories of historical African heroines such as Krotoa of the Cape. Since 2001 she has been apprentice to Oom Johannes Willemse (a Griqua Shaman) in the deep recesses of the Karoo. She is also featured in "Van Nature", a regular insert on the Afrikaans breakfast show Dagbreek.

== Kruie kraai koning ==
Translated from the Afrikaans: "Herbs rule." The phrase plays on the old Afrikaans saying that herbs are natures cure for every and any ailment.

Since 2003, Pienaar and Oom (uncle) Johannes Willemse (a Griqua Shaman) in his late 90s are regulars on Amore Bekkers' afternoon drive show (Tjailatyd) on the National Afrikaans Radio Station (Radio Sonder Grense, (RSG)) and answers listeners questions on a weekly basis from location in the heart of the Great Karoo of South Africa. Pienaar received great acclaim in the Afrikaans community thanks to the efforts of Amore Bekker and RSG with this program.

Pienaar's book: "Kruidjie roer my" / "The Griqua's Apprentice" on folk remedies from the Griqua and Afrikaner (Boer) communities was published with the help of RSG.

In her own words, the publication of The Griqua's Apprentice is "the first step in preserving the Karoo herb heritage for South Africa and the world".

== Personal life ==
After contracting cerebral malaria on a trip to Mali in West Africa in 2001 she was severely weakened and decided to stay on Theefontein (the farm of her second cousin Jacques Pienaar). She claims that the Karoo and its herbs healed her. Pienaar never married.
