= Durbanville High School =

High school in Durbanville, South Africa

Hoërskool Durbanville
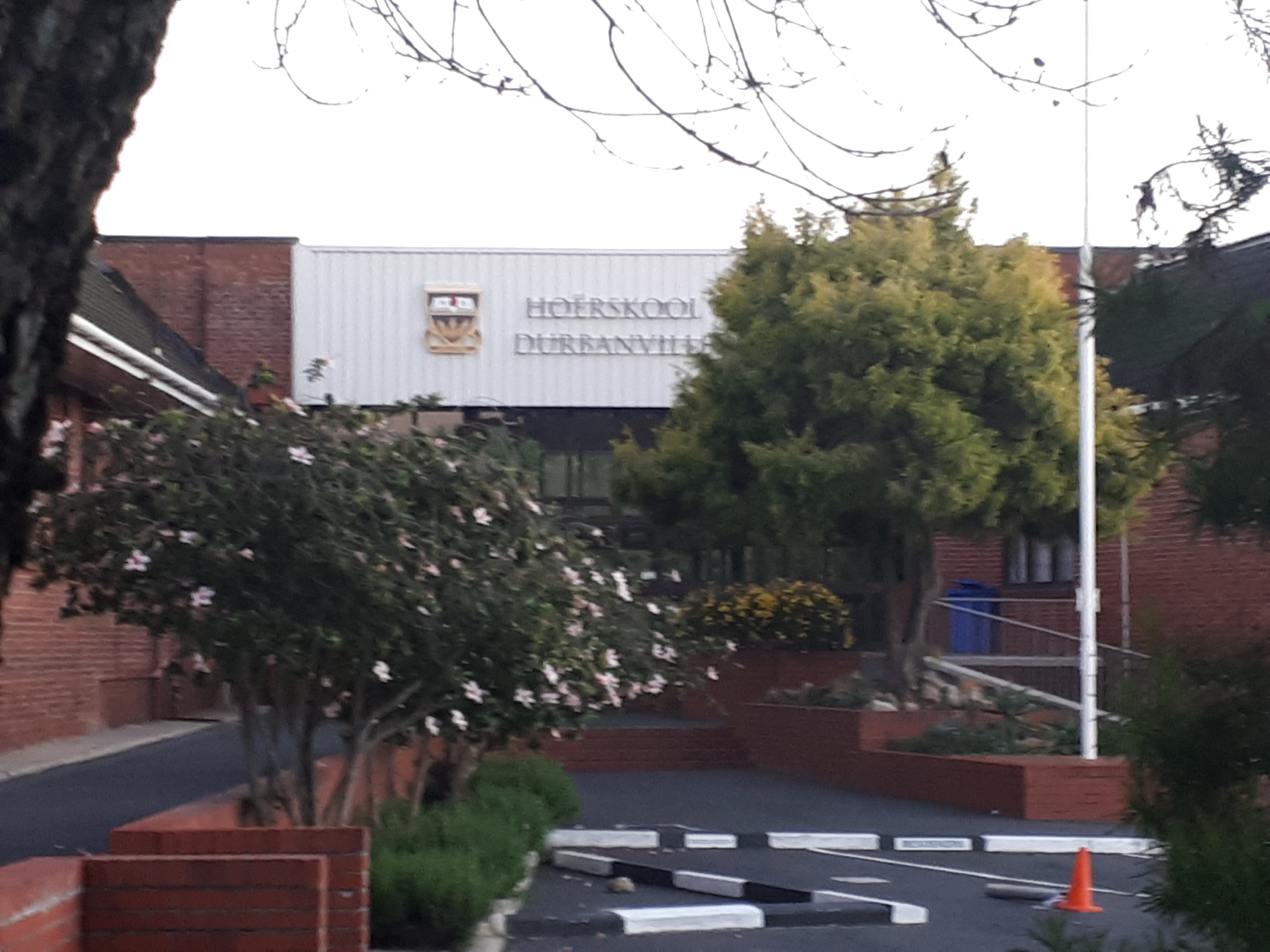
- Hoërskool Durbanville 2018

Location
- Langenhoven Street, Durbanville; Western Cape; South Africa
- Coordinates: 33.830579°S 18.643065°E

Information
- School type: Public & Boarding
- Motto: Labor Ornat.(Latin) Translated it means : Work Beautified
- Religious affiliation: Christianity
- Established: 1827; 199 years ago
- School district: District 4
- School number: 021 976 3188
- Principal: Mr C. Venter
- Staff: 73 full-time
- Grades: 8–12
- Gender: Boys & Girls
- Age: 14 to 18
- Schedule: 07:30 - 14:00
- Hours in school day: 6 hours, 30 minutes
- Campus: Urban Campus
- Campus type: Suburban
- Colour: 🟥🟨🟦
- Slogan: Labor Ornat
- Mascot: Honey badger (named Durbo)
- Rival: Stellenberg High School
- Accreditation: Western Cape Education Department
- School fees: R42 500 (tuition); R45 800 (boarding)
- Feeder schools: Durbanville Primary School; Gene Louw Primary School; Kenridge Primary School; Eversdal Primary School; Welgemoed Primary School
- Alumni: Amore Bekker, Jack Parow, Zanne Stapelberg, Johnny Trytsman, Demi Lee Moore
- Website: http://www.durbanvillehs.co.za/

Hoërskool Durbanville is a public Afrikaans medium co-educational high school situated in the town of Durbanville in the Western Cape province of South Africa. It is a public school. It is the oldest High School in the Northern Suburbs of Cape Town, and the only other school older in the Greater Cape Town metropolitan area is Simons Town School in the southern suburbs.

== Founding ==
The school was established in 1827, as a school catering for children from SubA (Grade 1) to Standard 10 (Grade 12). In 1955 the primary section of the school (SubA to Standard 5) split off to become a school separate from the High school on a separate premises, called Durbanville Primary.

== Head Masters ==
The first head master was Mellet, H.F. He stayed on until 1838. He was followed in quick succession by: Frylinck, J., Ackerman, C.J., de Beer, P.J., Hodgson, G. The headmasters to follow after these were: Roth, J.P.W. (1852-1859), Auret, E.B. (1859-1861), Hoek, J.(1861-1865), d’Arcy, G.A.(1865-1872), Dreyer, H.M.(1872-1875), Poccock, A.A.(1875-1884), Craig, T.(1884-1886), Bain, A.(1886-1887). In 1887 C.J. Haefele was appointed head master and he stayed on until 1921. He was related to the Haefele family from Wupperthal. In 1921 Hugo, D.P. was appointed, followed in 1939 by Ehlers, P.J., 1941 by Grobbelaar, J.J.S., 1943 by de Jager, A.K., 1950 by Stimie, C.M., 1969 by van Niekerk, A.A.J., 1974 by Firmani, O., 1985 by Bezuidenhout, J.W.L. and in 1997 by G Germishuys. The current head master is C Venter who started in 2020.

== Language medium and gender ==
The language medium is Afrikaans. It hosts both sexes.

== Hostel ==
The school has hostel facilities for boys and girls. The hostel opened in 1942.

== Motto ==
Labor Ornat. This is Latin for Work Beautified

== Alumni ==
- Amore Bekker – Radio presenter
- Jack Parow – Rapper.
- Angus Cleophas – Western Province Rugby player. He is a backline player
- Zanne Stapelberg – Opera singer.
- Johnny Trytsman – South African Rugby Player
- Jayden Nell - South African Rugby Player
