= Hugo Lambrechts Music Centre =

Centre for the study of classical music for school-going pupils

Coordinates: 33°54′27″S 18°35′21″E

- Type: Public
- Established: 1986
- Director: Dr Arisa Voges
- Students: 480
- Location: Cape Town, South Africa
- Website: www.hugolambrechts.co.za

Hugo Lambrechts Music Centre is a dedicated centre for the study of classical music for school-going pupils. Established in 1986, it is housed in one of the oldest school buildings in the northern suburbs of Cape Town.

== Facilities ==
The old school building consists of 25 music rooms, used for tuition, chamber music concerts, internal and external examinations, meetings and small functions. The Centre Auditorium, a recent addition to the school building, seats 450 people. The Auditorium is used for student exposure to public performance as well as a venue for visiting national and international artists, as detailed below.

== Tuition ==
Students receive training in their choice of symphonic instruments including strings, woodwind, brass and percussion, as well as piano, singing and music theory.

Centre hours are from 10h00 to 18h00, since tuition takes place mainly in the afternoon. Each student receives an individual practical lesson with his/her teacher every week as well as an orchestral lesson, where the student gains experience playing in an orchestra.

Centre examinations take place at the end of the 4th term, to assess the student's progress made throughout the year and they receive a report.

== Orchestras ==
There are 12 orchestras at Hugo Lambrechts Music Centre in which Centre and non-centre students participate. Students are given the opportunity to perform in concerts at the Centre which include: the annual Prestige Concert, Ensemble Concert, Orchestra's Concert, Open Day, Christmas Concert and Chamber Concerts take place every 2nd week.

== Development programmes ==
The Hugo Lambrechts Music Centre has 4 development programmes to teach students from previously disadvantaged communities how to play various instruments. These students are also involved in the Centre orchestras and perform at several concerts held at Hugo Lambrechts Music Centre.

== Associated Music Competitions ==
The Sanlam Music Competition is held annually in the Hugo Lambrechts Music Centre Auditorium.
