= Durbanville =

Town in the Western Cape, South Africa

- Town
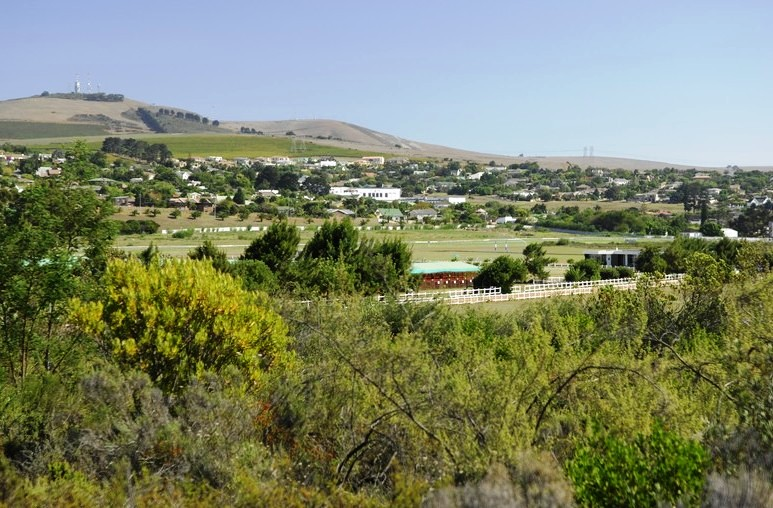
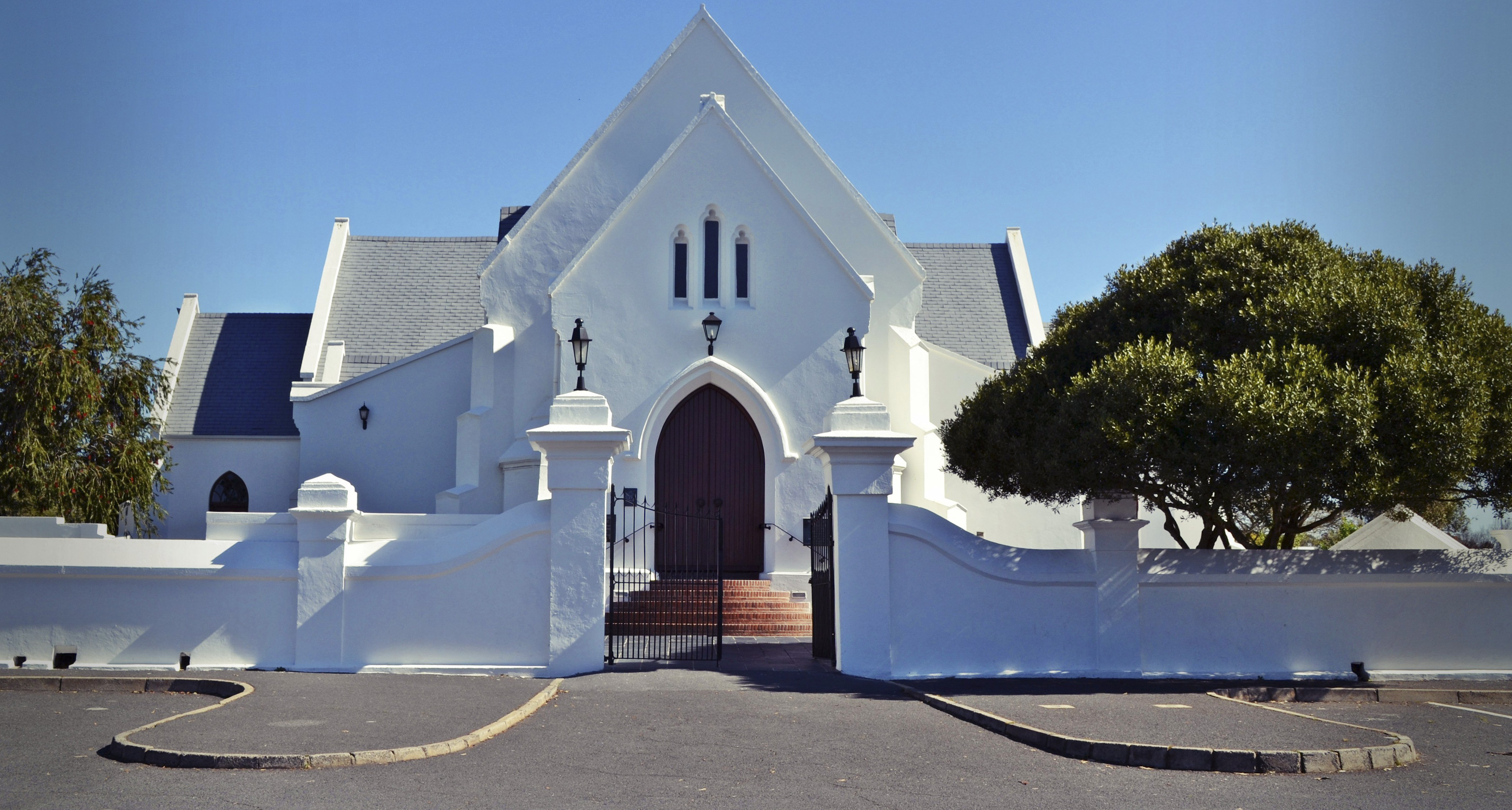
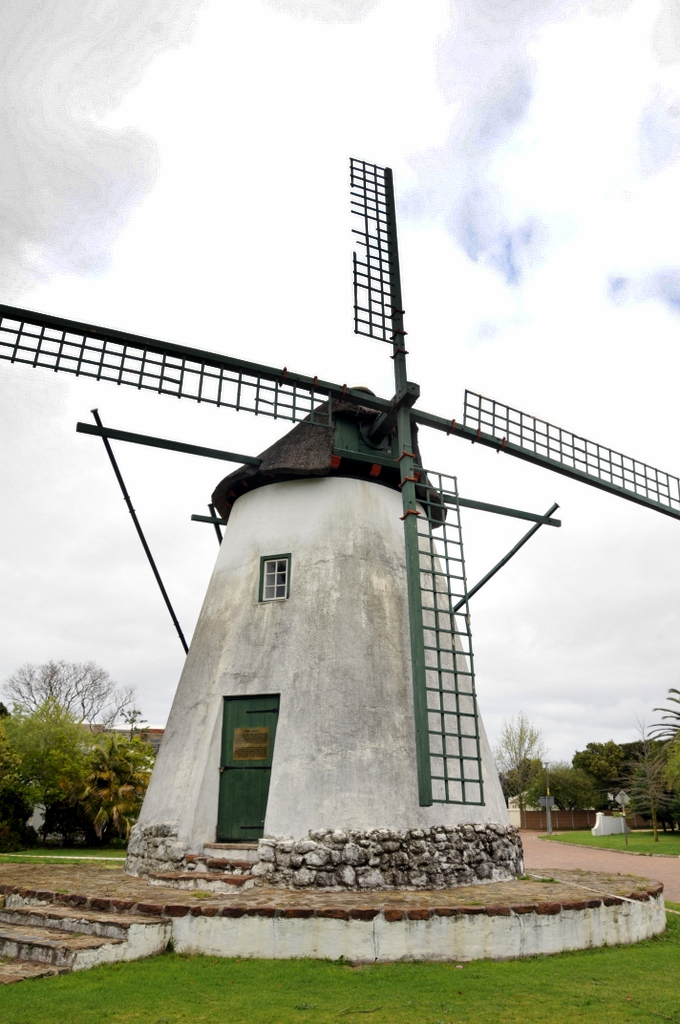
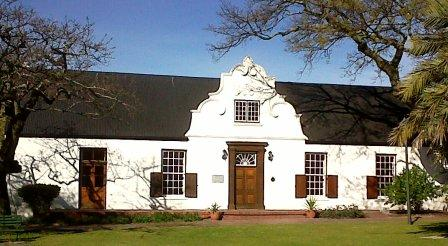
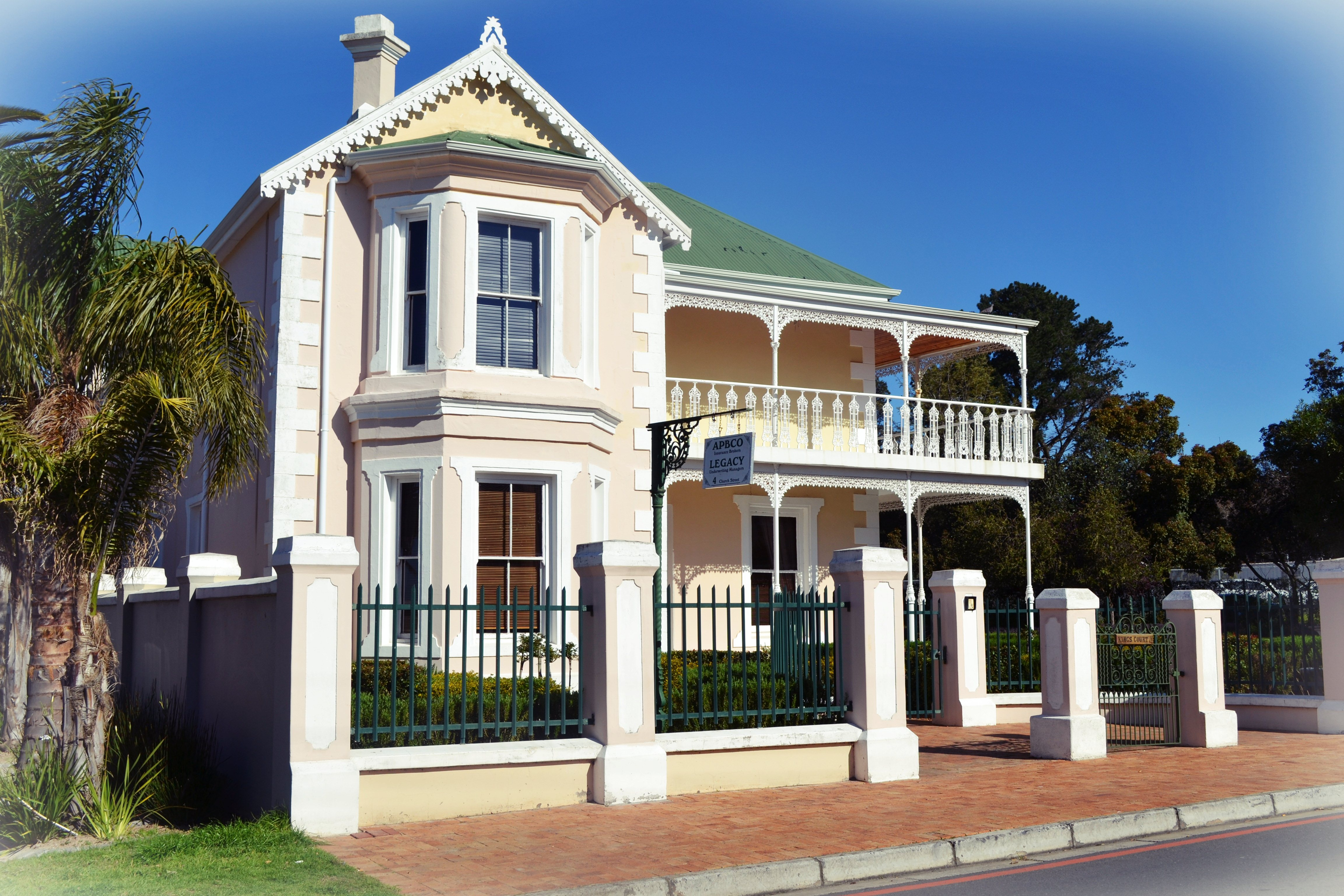
- From Top: View of Durbanville Nature Reserve; left: Dutch Reformed Church; right: Onze Molen Mill; left: Rust-en-Vrede Wine Farm; right: King's Court House.

- Location within Western Cape Location within South Africa
- Coordinates: 33°49′57″S 18°38′51″E
- Country: South Africa
- Province: Western Cape
- Municipality: City of Cape Town
- Established: 1825

Area
  - Total: 27.41 km^{2} (10.58 sq mi)

Population (2011)
  - Total: 54,286
  - Density: 1,981/km^{2} (5,130/sq mi)

Racial makeup (2011)
  - Black African: 5.5%
  - Coloured: 10.1%
  - Indian/Asian: 1.0%
  - White: 82.2%
  - Other: 1.2%

First languages (2011)
  - Afrikaans: 58.9%
  - English: 37.2%
  - Other: 3.8%
- Time zone: UTC+2 (SAST)
- Postal code (street): 7550
- PO box: 7551

Durbanville, previously called Pampoenkraal, is a town in the Western Cape province of South Africa, and part of the City of Cape Town metropolitan area. It is a semi-rural residential suburb on the north-eastern outskirts of the metropolis, surrounded by farms producing wine and wheat.

== History ==
Precolonial period (before 1652)

The first modern humans indigenous to the Cape area included the Khoina and the Khoisan tribes. The indigenous people lived in the Cape and its surrounding coastal areas dating as far back as 60 000 years ago. They migrated from the interior of the country, what is today the Northern Cape province, and from Botswana and Namibia to the Cape.

Dutch colonial period (1652–1795)

Durbanville's inception can be traced to a fresh water spring located in the town. The spring is currently situated behind the Durbanville Children's Home. The spring was designated by the VOC (Dutch East India Company, Dutch: Vereenigde Oostindische Compagnie) in the mid-1600s to be used as a water replenishment station for travelers on their way from Cape Town to the interior of southern Africa. In 1661 rhinoceros and ostrich were known to inhabit the area.

Durbanville was originally known as Pampoenkraal (from the Afrikaans words pampoen meaning pumpkin, and kraal meaning corral - an enclosure for livestock). This name was attributed to the town because of a pumpkin patch which grew alongside a dam located behind the current Town Hall. Due to the natural spring, Pampoenkraal became a preferred resting place for travellers before continuing on their journey into the interior.

During the late 1600s, the VOC allocated farms to free burghers situated around the town. Some of those farms are still in existence today, many of which are renowned for their wine production. These include Bloemendal, Meerendal, Diemersdal and Altydgedacht.

British colonial period (1795–1902)

The first portions of land were earmarked as residential properties and allocated in 1806, signifying the start and development of Durbanville.

In 1825 a group of local farmers requested permission from Lord Charles Somerset (governor of the Cape Colony at that time) to build their own church. The Dutch Reformed Church was commenced in 1825 and inaugurated a year later on 6 August 1826. A small village grew between the church and the outspan (overnight stop).

During 1836 the inhabitants of Pampoenkraal petitioned the Governor of the Cape Colony, Sir Benjamin d'Urban, for permission to rename the village D'Urban in his honour. Permission was duly granted and the new name persisted until 1886 when it was renamed to Durbanville in order to avoid confusion with Durban - a major port city in the east of South Africa.

Durbanville had its own court house, jail and magistrate from the 1870s and became a Magisterial District of Bellville. The court house complex still exists in altered form within the Rust-en-Vrede complex, originally erected in 1850. A village management board was established in 1897 and a municipality in 1901. The first mayor elected was John King.

The village grew rapidly after the turn of the 19th century and a local wagon industry developed. The King Brothers Wagon Works' used to be South Africa's biggest wagon works. At the turn of the century, it employed more than 200 men, which just about accounted for the entire village.

Post-Apartheid (1994-)

In 1996, Durbanville lost its municipal status and was dissolved into the Tygerberg Municipality along with Bellville, Parow and Goodwood as part of the transition in local government. As of 2000, Durbanville was amalgamated into the City of Cape Town Metropolitan Municipality and is effectively a large town within the confines of the City of Cape Town, with various smaller suburbs.

Although Durbanville is now part of the City of Cape Town, it is still a town in its own right, and contains various amenities which enables it to operate independently, which includes the Village Square centre with a newly upgraded Woolworths flagship store, opened in July 2025, and with the Groot Phesantekraal View shopping center that opened in 2025.

== Geography ==
Durbanville is situated in the northern suburbs of Cape Town, approximately 28 kilometres (17.4 mi) north-east of the city, bordered by Bellville to the south, Brackenfell to the south-east and Kraaifontein to the east. It lies at an altitude of between 100 m (328 ft) to 240 m (787 ft), in the vast rolling hills of Tygerberg and Koeberg.

=== Suburban Areas ===
Durbanville contains the following residential areas:

- Amanda Glen
- Aurora
- Avalon Estate
- Bergsig
- Brentwood Park
- Country Places
- D'urbanvale
- Durbanville Hills
- Durbell
- Durmonte
- Everglen
- Eversdal
- Eversdal Heights
- Goedemoed
- Graanendal
- Halali
- Kenridge
- Kenridge Heights
- Klein Nederburg
- Langeberg Village
- Langeberg Glen
- Langeberg Heights
- Morningstar
- Nerina
- Pinehurst
- Proteaville
- Rosedale
- Schoongezicht
- Sonstraal
- Sonstraal Heights
- Tara
- The Crest
- Valmary Park
- Vergesig
- Vierlanden
- Vygeboom
- Welgevonden Estate
- Wellway Park
- Wellway Park East

== Economy ==
=== Agriculture ===
==== Viticulture ====
The Durbanville Wine Valley is home to fifteen wine farms spread out along the scenic Tygerberg Hills, many of which offer wine tastings and fine dining. The valley is also dubbed as the "Sauvignon Blanc Country" owing to the amount of sauvignon blanc produced here which is favoured by winemakers for its cooler climate (by comparison to the Boland wine region) influenced by the winds of Table Bay and False Bay resulting in a different style of wine produced within the valley.

==== Dairy ====
Welgegund, situated just outside Durbanville along Malanshoogte Road, is a dairy farm owned by Fair Cape, which is one of the largest dairy producers in the Western Cape. Established in 1955 with just 64 cows on the farm, today Welgegund now has 5625 cows with each of them delivering 40 litres of milk daily.

=== Retail ===
==== Central Business District ====
The historical town centre, the Durbanville CBD remains the traditional commercial centre of the town with shops, bars, cafés, boutiques and restaurants along the main high street of Wellington Road and many more tucked away down the side streets.

==== Shopping centres ====
There are four major shopping centres serving Durbanville, three of which are located in Durbanville Central - De Ville Centre, Durbanville Town Centre, and The Village Square. The fourth is Groot Phesantekraal View, which opened in 2025.

Also found in the town are the following smaller shopping centres:

- Clara Anna Square
- Cobble Walk
- Graanendal Shopping Centre
- Ipic Shopping Centre Aurora
- Ipic Shopping Centre Kenridge
- Ipic Shopping Centre Sonstraal
- Midville Centre
- Pinehurst Centre

=== Mining and Industries ===
Durbanville is surrounded by a number of stoning quarries on the Tygerberg Hills with companies such as Afrimat, Portland and Ciolli Bros operating in the area.

The Greater Durbanville area has two areas of light industry, both situated just outside the town, with the Durbanville Industrial Park to the east, along the R302 and the Atlantic Hills/Atlas Gardens area to the west, near the N7. The Atlantic Hills Business Park, which is situated adjacent the established Atlas Gardens Business Park is currently one of the fastest-growing light industrial areas in the Greater Cape Town metropolitan area.

=== Major companies ===
Notable companies such as Stadio Holdings (an independent higher education provider in South Africa), Xneelo (South African web hosting company), and Puma South Africa have their head offices in Durbanville.

== Growth ==
In recent years, there has been a population boom in Durbanville with former farmland been given over to large gated estates such as Pinehurst, Graanendal and Clara Anna Fontein. This has gradually changed the image of the town to more of a high-income area and one of the most sought-after northern suburbs of Cape Town.

As a result of the growth, many roads in and around Durbanville have had to be extended in order to accommodate the boom including Jip de Jäger Road, Legato Road, Okavango Road and Brackenfell Boulevard.

The Durbanville CBD has also seen high levels of investment over the past few years, with the upgrading of De Ville Centre, Durbanville Town Centre and Midville Centre and the recent launch of The Village Square. This has resulted in small-scale gentrification in the CBD and hence an increase in coffee shops and street-side cafes and restaurants.

However, Durbanville still boasts large quantities of farmland and smallholdings along its borders, despite the recent developments, which has resulted in the town being able to retain its unique country atmospheres.

== Culture ==
=== Languages ===
Afrikaans and English are the main languages spoken in Durbanville. In the past Afrikaans predominated culturally, but this has changed with the rapid development of the town. However the majority (59%) of the town still speaks Afrikaans as a first language. The principal religion of the population is Christianity with a wide variety of churches in the community

=== Historical attractions ===
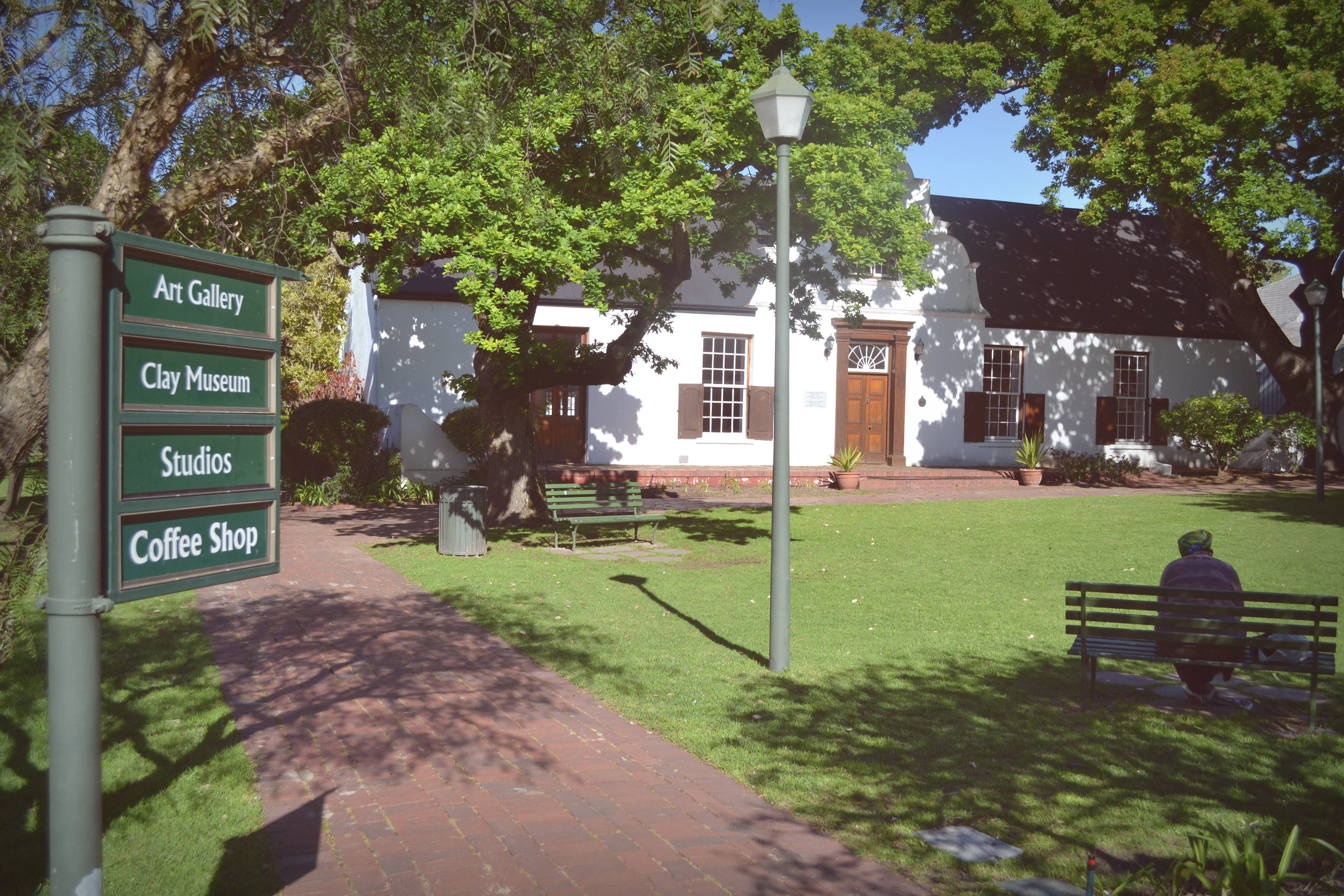
Rust-en-Vrede Art Gallery, Wellington Road

Owing to the rich history and heritage of the town, Durbanville boasts its fair share of historical features and attractions largely situated in the CBD and its immediate surroundings including:

- Rust-en-Vrede Art Gallery on Wellington Road (built in the 1840s and was originally used as a prison and police headquarters, then a magistrate's court)
- Onze Molen Windmill
- Durbanville Synagogue
- Durbanville Dutch Reformed Church
- Original Cape Dutch houses on historical streets such as Church Street, Gladstone Street, Main Street, Oxford Street, Queen Street and Scher Street

== Demographics ==
According to the 2011 Census, the population of Durbanville was 54,286. The following tables show various demographic data about Durbanville from that census.

Gender

Gender	Population	%
Female	28 615	52.71%
Male	25 671	47.29%

Racial Makeup

Group	Population	%
White	44 607	82.17%
Coloured	5 491	10.11%
Black African	2 995	5.52%
Indian/Asian	560	1.03%

Home Language

Language	Population	%
Afrikaans	31 346	58.94%
English	19 803	37.24%
Xhosa	491	0.92%
Other African languages	752	1.39%
Other languages	732	1.38%

== Education ==
The town has the following public high schools:

- Durbanville High School (an Afrikaans-medium school)
- Fairmont High School (an English-medium school)
- Stellenberg High School (a dual-medium school) - although it is located in Bellville, it falls under Durbanville's feeder area.

The area is home to numerous primary schools, including:

- Durbanville Preparatory
- Durbanville Primary
- Eversdal Primary
- Gene Louw Primary
- Kenridge Primary
- The Valley Primary

Durbanville also has a number of private schools, including:

- Curro Durbanville
- El Shaddai Christian School
- Meridian Pinehurst
- Reddam House Durbanville

== Healthcare ==
=== Private healthcare ===
Mediclinic Durbanville is the sole hospital serving the town of Durbanville. Owned by Mediclinic International, it is a private hospital operating 24-hour emergency services. The hospital is located in the heart of the town on Wellington Road.

=== Public healthcare ===
A short distance from Mediclinic Durbanville, the Durbanville Community Day Centre is a government-funded clinic operated by the Western Cape Department of Health and Wellness.

== Transport ==
=== Air ===
Cape Winelands Airport is located approximately 13 km NE of Durbanville. Located in the Western Cape winelands, Cape Winelands Airport (formerly Fisantekraal Airfield) is an ex–South African Airforce airfield now operating privately as a general flying airfield and used for aviation training. Of the four original runways, two remain operational while the other two are used for film production. It has been in private ownership since 2021.

Operators at the airfield are Cape Town Flight Training Centre and Aerosport Training. The Fighting on Fire organisation also has a summer base at Cape Winelands Airport. The ICAO designator is FAWN. Located on a 150ha site, Cape Winelands Airport has a number of aircraft hangars for the storage and maintenance of private aircraft and helicopters.

=== Bus and taxi transit ===
Durbanville is served by Golden Arrow Bus Services which operates daily commuter bus services across the Cape Metropole. Minibus taxis are also a major form of public transportation in Durbanville with the majority of minibus taxis terminating at the Durbanville Public Transport Interchange in the town centre.

=== Rail ===
Durbanville is one of the few areas in the Greater Cape Town metropolitan area that do not have a railway passing through, however the nearest railway stations are located within a 10 kilometre radius including Kraaifontein, Bellville, and Brackenfell railway stations.

=== Roads ===
The main route through Durbanville is the R302, which is formed by three roads (Durbanville Avenue, Main Street and Wellington Road). It connects the town with Klipheuwel and Malmesbury to the north-east and with Bellville to the south. The R312 (Lichtenburg Road) starts from the R302 in the north-east of the town, running towards Fisantekraal and Wellington.

The town is also connected to surrounding towns and villages by a number of metropolitan routes:

- Bellville via the M13 (Church Street; Race Course Road; Tygerberg Valley Road), M16 (Jip de Jager Drive), M31 (Tygerberg Valley Road) and the M124 (Eversdal Road)
- Milnerton via the M13
- Vissershok via the M48 (Vissershok Road)
- Philadelphia via the M58(Koeberg Road; Adderley Road)
- Brackenfell via the M73 (De Bron Road), the M100 (Brackenfell Boulevard) and the M137 (Okavango Road)
- Kraaifontein via the M15 (Langeberg Road) and the M137 (Okavango Road)

== Nature Reserves ==
The three nature reserves in Durbanville include the Durbanville Nature Reserve situated adjacent the racecourse along Race Course Road and the Uitkamp Wetland Nature Reserve situated in D'Urbanvale, north of Durbanville as well as Botterblom Nature Reserve situated in Vierlanden.

== Sports ==
=== Durbanville Golf Club ===
Affectionately known as the "Jewel of the North", the Durbanville Golf Club is a large 18-hole golf course that was opened in 1967 and is located south of the Durbanville CBD.

=== Durbanville Racecourse ===
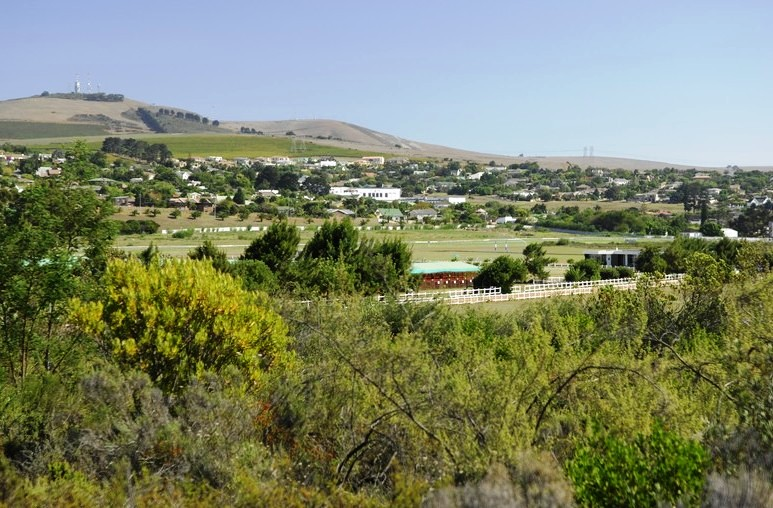
A view of the Hollywoodbets Durbanville Racecourse from the Durbanville Nature Reserve

One of the main attractions which draws visitors to Durbanville is the Hollywoodbets Durbanville Racecourse, established in 1922 and is one of the only two horse race courses in the Western Cape along with Kenilworth in the Southern Suburbs. Situated just south-west of the CBD, it has a left-handed oval course with a circumference of around 2200m and a home straight of roughly 600m.

In August 2022, Cape Racing announced Hollywoodbets as the naming rights sponsor for the Durbanville and Kenilworth racecourses, and as a result the Durbanville Racecourse is now known as the Hollywoodbets Durbanville Racecourse.

=== Cycling ===
Durbanville is host to 3 major annual cycling events in the Western Cape, which are as follows:

- Durbie Dash (usually in October) - 99er Cycle Tour (usually early February) - Tour de PPA (usually late February)

== Notable people ==
- Mark Shuttleworth — founder of Thawte; second self-funded space tourist
- Amore Bekker — radio personality, author, MC and columnist
- Jody Williams — winner of Idols season 4
- Annelisa Weiland — actress; played Hilda de Kock on popular South African soapie 7de Laan
- Duane Vermeulen — rugby union player for Western Province, Stormers and the Springboks
- Jack Parow — Afrikaans rapper
- Zanne Stapelberg — international operatic soprano

== Coat of arms ==
The Durbanville municipal council assumed a coat of arms, designed by Ivan Mitford-Barberton and H. Ellis Tomlinson, in April 1948, and registered them at the Bureau of Heraldry in February 1981.The National Archives and Records Service of South Africa (NARSSA)

The arms, derived from those of Sir Benjamin d'Urban, were : Or, on a chevron between in chief two six-pointed stars Sable and in base a bunch of grapes proper, three garbs Or. In layman's term, the shield is gold and depicts, from top to bottom, two black six-pointed stars, a blue chevron bearing three golden sheaves of wheat, and a bunch of grapes.

The crest was a red sphinx charged with three golden rings, and the motto Sit nomine digna.
