= De Nieuwe Molen =

Oldest and largest extant mill in South Africa

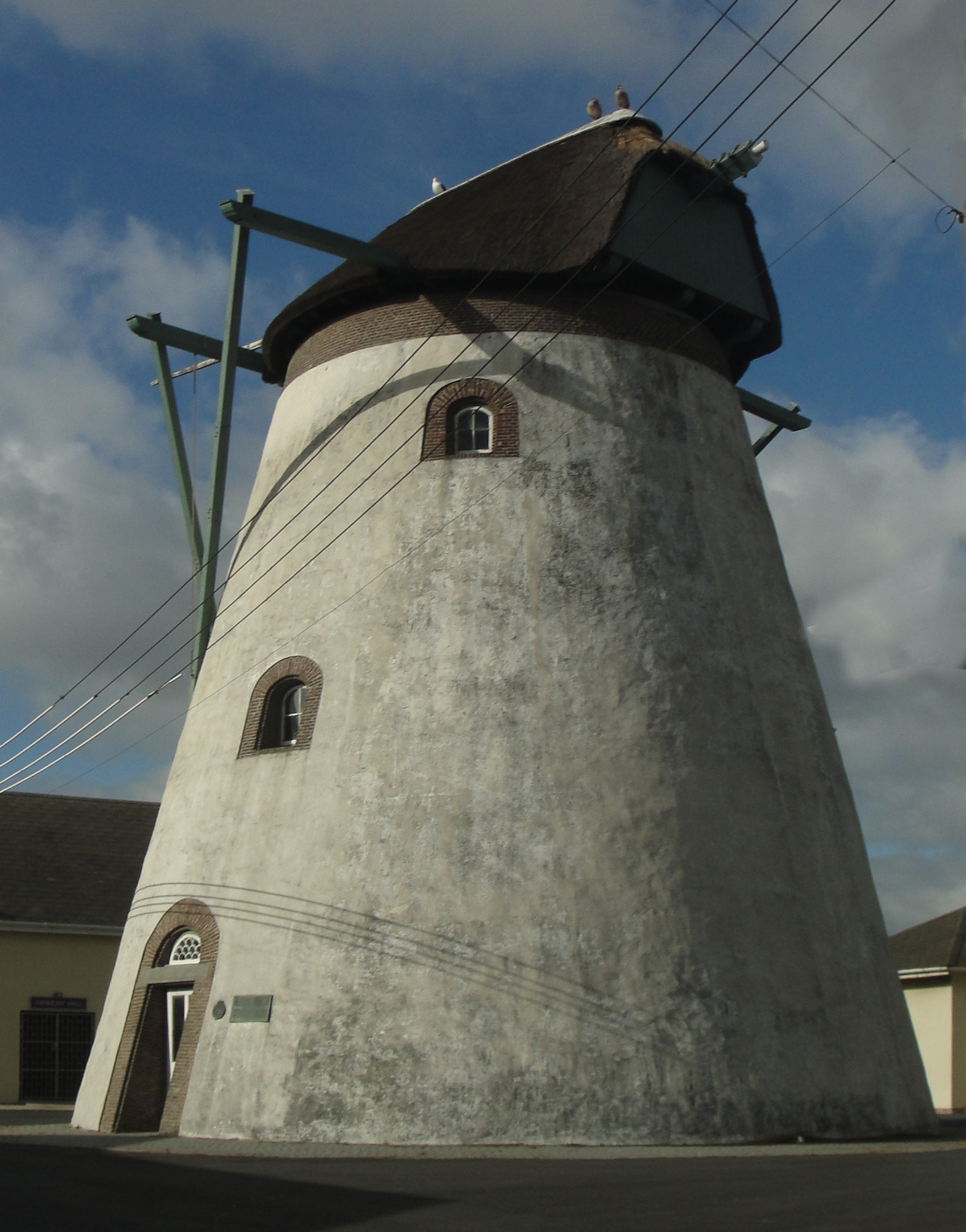
- De Nieuwe Molen in 2012

Origin
- Coordinates: 33°55′57.2052″S 18°28′56.4312″E
- Year built: 1782; 243 years ago

Information
- Type: Tower mill

De Nieuwe Molen is the oldest and the largest extant mill in South Africa and was built in 1782 near the Black River. The mill is situated in the Alexandra Hospital in Maitland, Cape Town and was declared a National Monument in 1978.

== History ==
In 1780, master mason Johan Gottfried Mocke was employed to build the new mill. It was built of imported Dutch baked bricks that were used by sailing ships as ballast material. The mill stood 42m high (including sails) with a diameter of about 10m at the base, and the blades had a flight of 23m. Around 1870, the sails of the windmill were torn off by a storm. The damage was not repaired and the mill became obsolete. The machinery and other woodwork were removed around the year 1920. In 1906, the Alexandra Institute for the disabled was opened near the mill and after 1928, the mill was included in the premises of this institution. The mill was renovated and used as a chapel. The most recent renovation of the mill was in 1996.

== See also ==
- Alexandra Hospital
