= Western Cape Department of Health =

Western Cape Department of Health and Wellness

Department overview
- Formed: 1994
- Jurisdiction: Government of the Western Cape
- Headquarters: Provincial Administration Building, 4 Dorp Street, Cape Town; 33°55′27″S 18°25′05″E
- Employees: 27,993
- Annual budget: R11,962,863,000
- Minister responsible: Mireille Wenger, Provincial Minister of Health
- Department executives: Dr E.H. Engelbrecht, Superintendent-General of Health; Dr Keith Cloete, Head of Department: Western Cape Health
- Website: www.westerncape.gov.za/eng/health

The Western Cape Department of Health and Wellness is a department of the Government of the Western Cape, responsible for providing public healthcare to the population of the Western Cape province of South Africa.

The political head of the department is the Provincial Minister of Health and Wellness; as of 2015 this is Mireille Wenger of the Democratic Alliance. The administrative head is the Superintendent-General of Health; as of 2010 this was Professor Craig Househam. In the 2010/11 financial year, the department had 27,993 employees and a budget of R11,962,863,000.

== Hospitals ==
In the Western Cape there are 428 public primary care facilities (clinics and community health centres), some operated by the Department of Health, while others are operated by the City of Cape Town and funded by transfer payments from the department.

Public secondary care services are provided by 32 district hospitals, six regional hospitals, and three central hospitals (which also provide tertiary care; see below).

Three central hospitals in Cape Town provide tertiary care; these are Groote Schuur Hospital, Tygerberg Hospital, and Red Cross War Memorial Children's Hospital. They take specialist referrals from other hospitals across the province, and in many cases from other provinces or even other African countries.

The department also runs various specialised facilities, including six tuberculosis hospitals, four psychiatric hospitals, and a rehabilitation centre.

== See also ==
- Department of Health (South Africa)
- Healthcare in South Africa
- List of hospitals in South Africa
