= Swartland Shale Renosterveld =

Vegetation type endemic to the Western Cape, South Africa

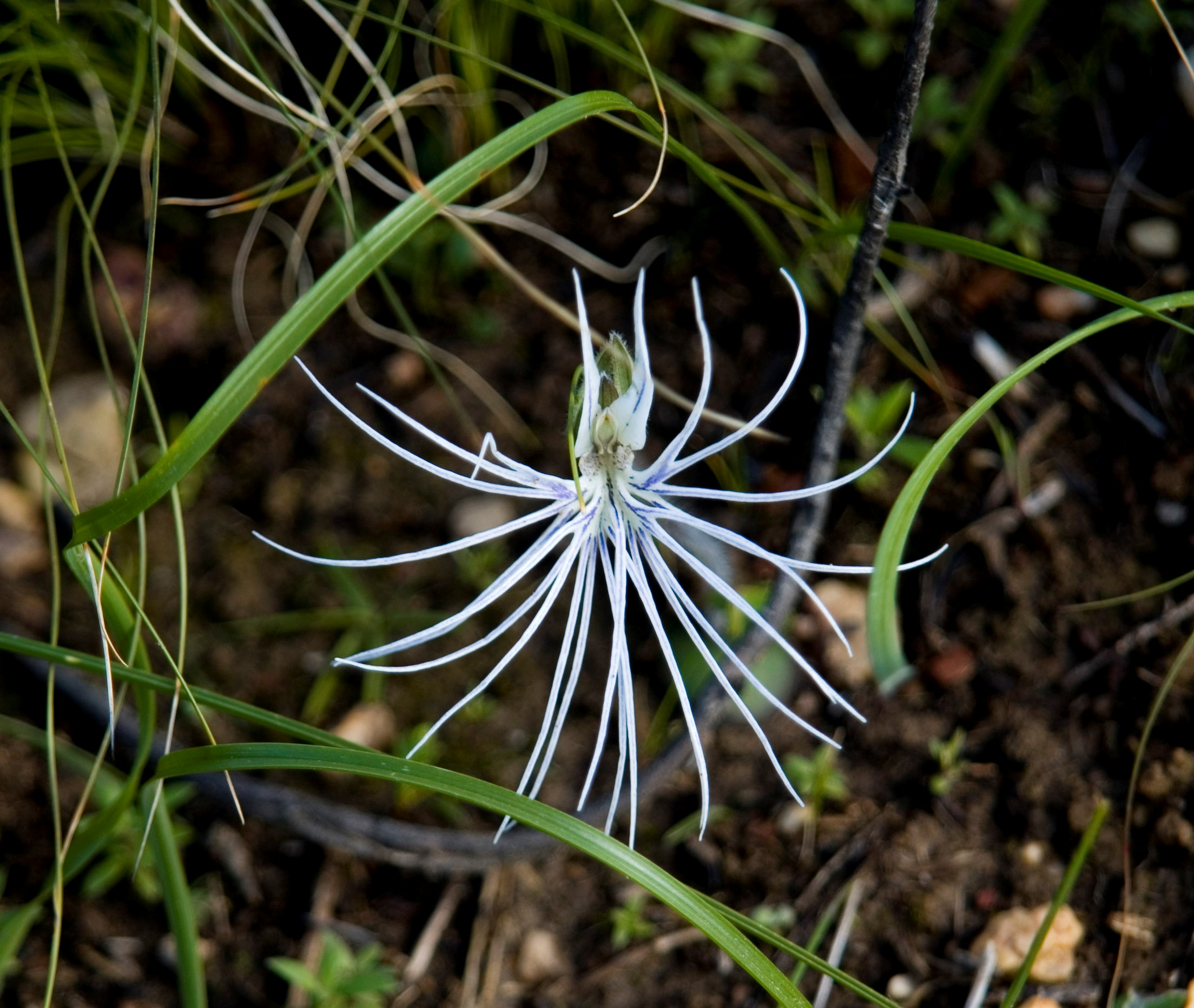
The Spider Orchid, a geophyte found in Swartland Shale Renosterveld vegetation

Swartland Shale Renosterveld (West Coast Renosterveld) is a critically endangered vegetation type of the Western Cape, South Africa.

== Distribution ==
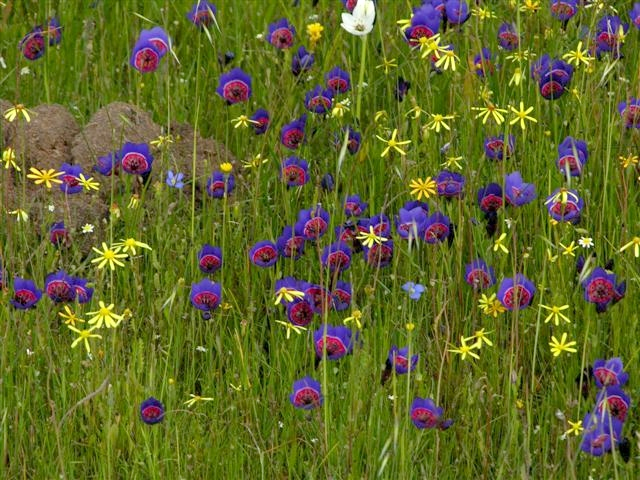
Geissorhiza radians flowers in Swartland Shale Renosterveld, South Africa.

This unique type of Renosterveld vegetation occurs over the Swartland and Boland areas, on the West Coast lowlands to the north of Cape Town. It extends from north of Piketberg, southwards as far as Somerset West. Around 10 percent of this area lies within the Cape Town metropol (where historically it was the most widespread form of Renosterveld, especially concentrated on the Tygerberg Hills in the northern suburbs) and, overall, over 90 percent of this vegetation has been destroyed for farming and other development. The remaining patches are threatened by invasive alien plants and further development, making this vegetation type critically endangered.

== Description ==
Undisturbed, it forms tall, open shrubland over undulating valleys and plains. It usually grows in clay soils that are derived from the Malmesbury Group Shales. Termite mounds create large, round hummocks called “heuweltjies”, that are a prominent feature of this vegetation type, appearing as pale spots on the landscape. Indigenous trees and older thicket often occur around these features. The Renosterbos is relatively common in this vegetation, but this may be due to recent overgrazing – the renosterbos is rather inedible and consequently livestock tend to avoid it.

== Threats and conservation ==
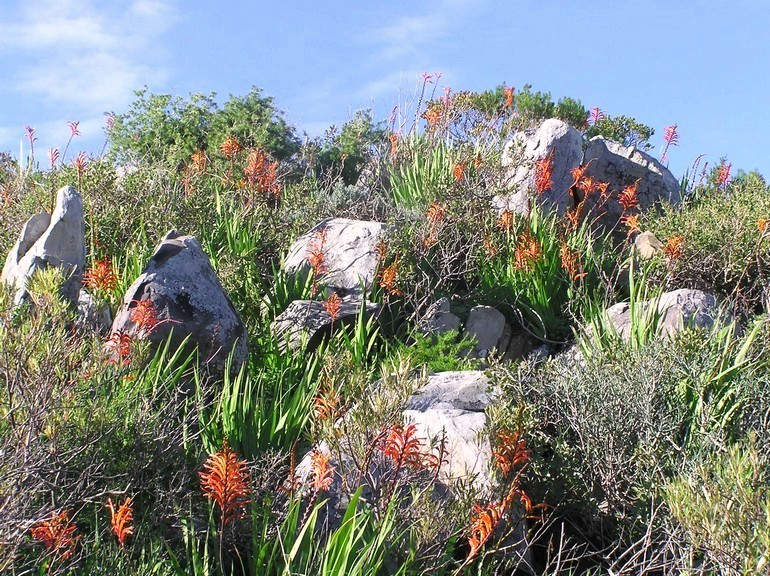
Swartland Shale Renosterveld at Tygerberg Nature Reserve, Cape Town

The vast majority of Swartland Shale Renosterveld has been lost (the target of saving 26% is now unattainable, as 90% is already completely transformed for farming). Remnants survive in tiny isolated patches within farmland, usually only on rougher, steeper ground that cannot be cultivated. Only a few pockets are actually protected, and most surviving areas are threatened by invasive alien plants such as Acacia saligna (“Port Jackson”), Acacia mearnsii and a variety of other invasive trees, grasses and herbs.

== List of some endemic plants ==
There are a great many plant species within this ecosystem which are totally endemic - existing in this vegetation type and nowhere else in the world. A partial list is included below.

List of some plant endemics
- Leucadendron verticillatum
- Aspalathus acanthophylla
- Aspalathus horizontalis
- Aspalathus pinguis subsp. longissima
- Aspalathus pinguis subsp. occidentalis
- Aspalathus puberula
- Aspalathus rectistyla
- Cliffortia acockii
- Lotononis complanata
- Serruria incrassata
- Erepsia ramosa
- Ruschia patens
- Ruschia pauciflora
- Indigofera triquetra
- Aristea lugens
- Babiana angustifolia
- Babiana latifolia
- Babiana odorata
- Babiana secunda
- Hesperantha pallescens
- Hesperantha spicata subsp. fistulosa
- Lachenalia liliflora
- Lachenalia mediana rogersii
- Lachenalia orthopetala
- Lapeirousia fastigiata
- Moraea gigandra
- Moraea tulbaghensis
- Oxalis fragilis
- Oxalis involuta
- Oxalis leptocalyx
- Oxalis levis
- Oxalis macra
- Oxalis perineson
- Oxalis strigosa
- Pelargonium viciifolium

== Gallery ==
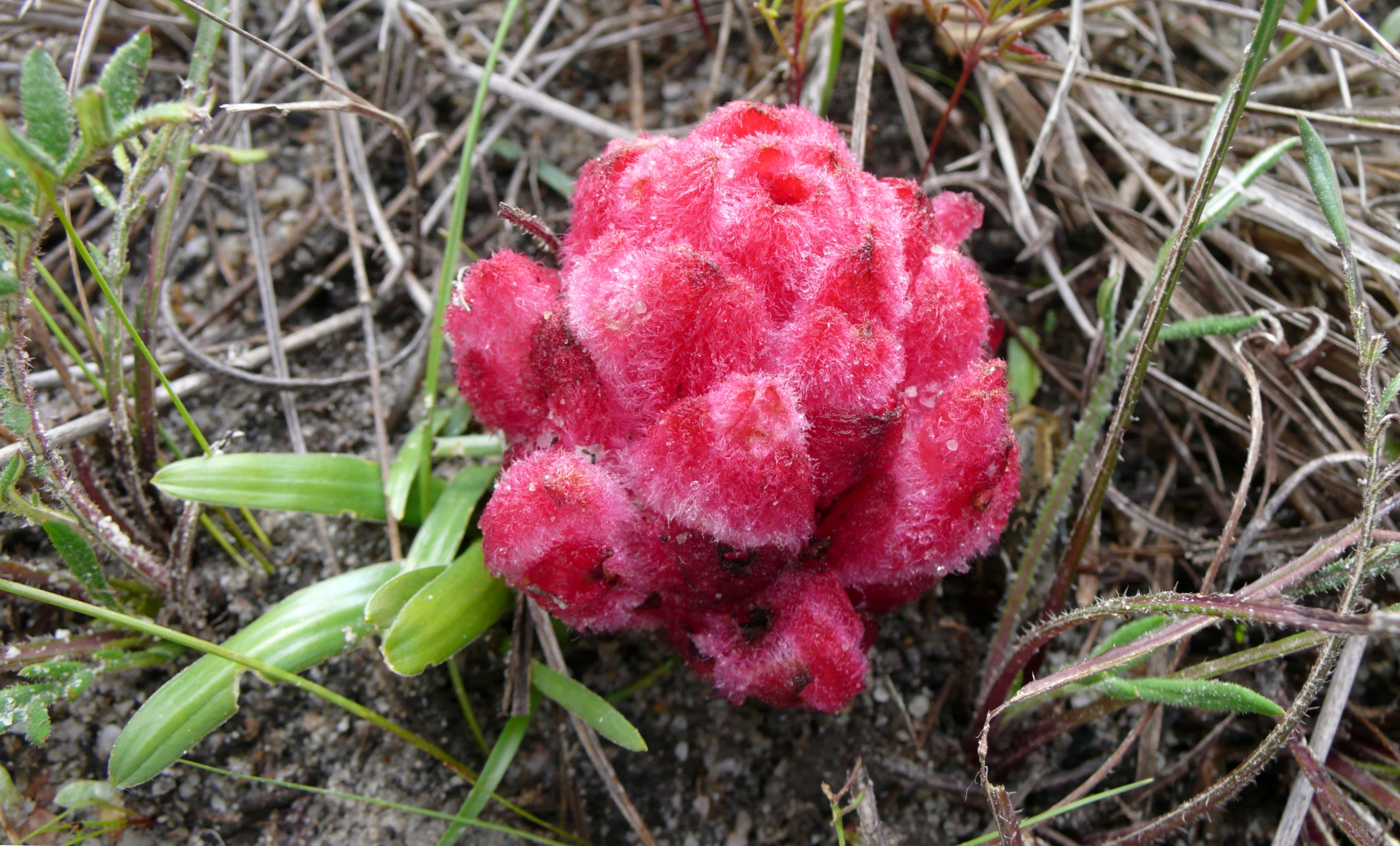
Hyobanche sanguinea, an indigenous Renosterveld flower

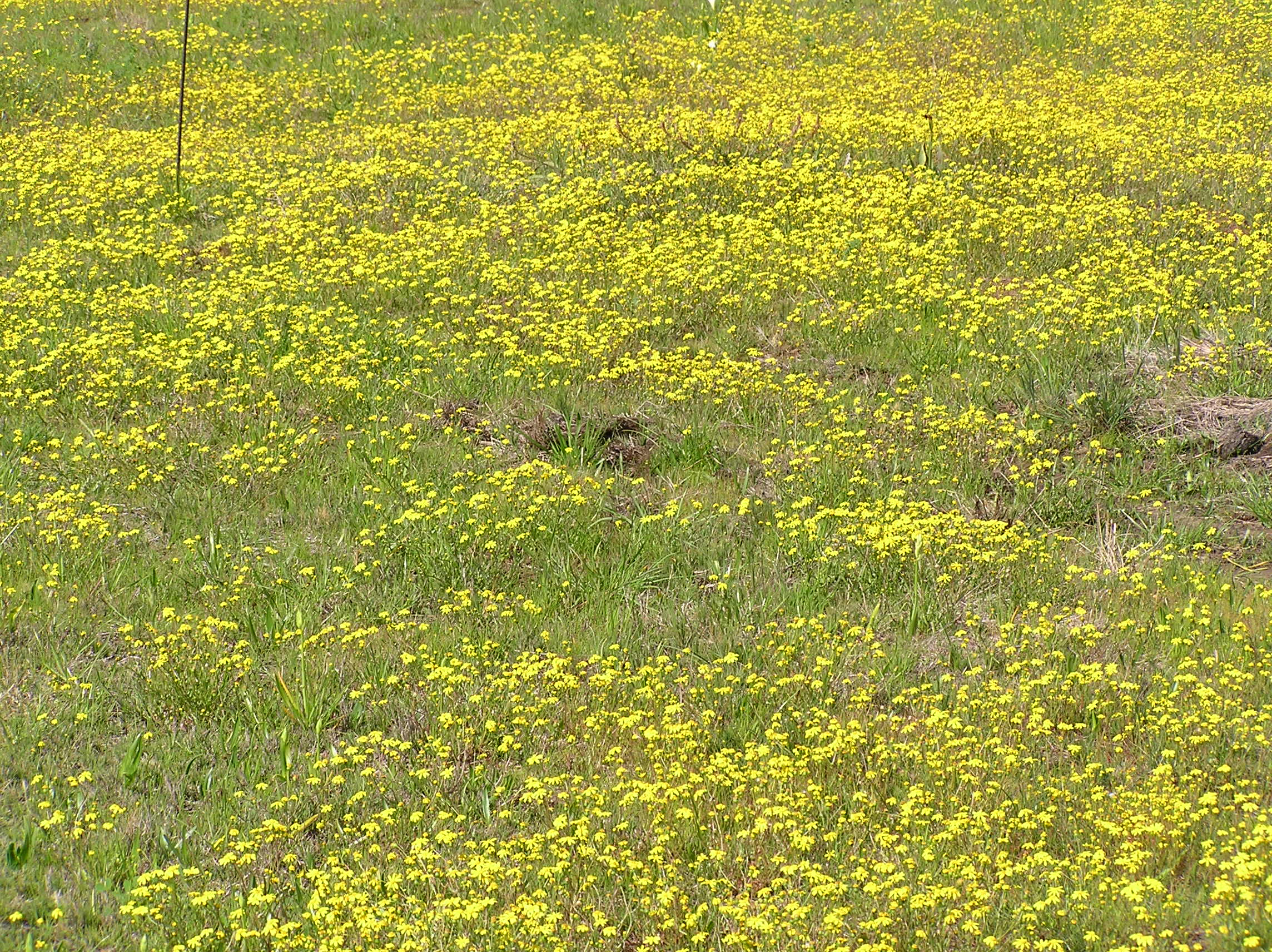
Swartland Shale Renosterveld in flower, at Tienie Versveld Reserve near the town of Darling.

== See also ==
- Biodiversity of Cape Town
- List of nature reserves in Cape Town
- Peninsula Shale Renosterveld
- Renosterveld
