= Cephalophyllum diversiphyllum =

Scientific classification
- Kingdom: Plantae
- Clade: Tracheophytes
- Clade: Angiosperms
- Clade: Eudicots
- Order: Caryophyllales
- Family: Aizoaceae
- Genus: Cephalophyllum
- Species: C. diversiphyllum

Binomial name
- Cephalophyllum diversiphyllum (Haw.) N.E.Br.

Species of succulent

Cephalophyllum diversiphyllum is a plant species in the family Aizoaceae, endemic to the Western Cape Province, South Africa.

== Description ==
A compact succulent groundcover, with dark green, acute, triquetrous (triangular in cross-section) leaves, and yellow or purple flowers. The plants tend to have a central tuft, with temporary stems that branch off away from it, each year.

It can be distinguished from its close relative Cephalophyllum purpureo-album by its triquetrous leaves. It can be distinguished from its close relative Cephalophyllum subulatoides by its growth habit.

== Distribution and habitat ==
This species is endemic to the southern parts of the Western Cape Province, South Africa. It can be found from the Bredasdorp area, eastwards past Swellendam, as far as Heidelberg and Riversdale.

Its ecological preference is relatively open or exposed areas in fynbos / renosterveld vegetation, usually growing in rocky humus overlaying limestone.
