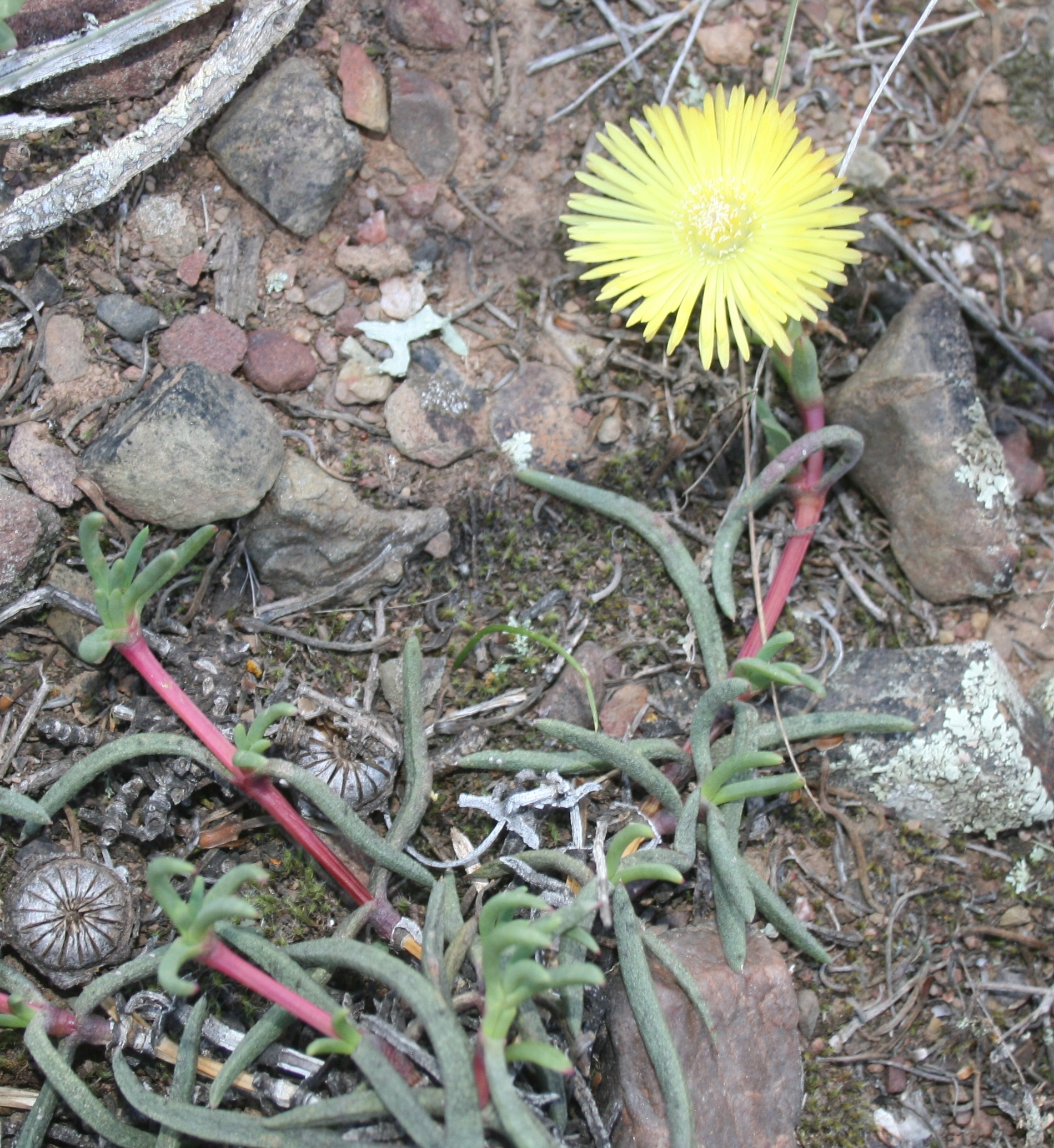
- The spreading stems and slender, cylindrical leaves of C.purpureo-album

Scientific classification
- Kingdom: Plantae
- Clade: Tracheophytes
- Clade: Angiosperms
- Clade: Eudicots
- Order: Caryophyllales
- Family: Aizoaceae
- Genus: Cephalophyllum
- Species: C. purpureo-album

Binomial name
- Cephalophyllum purpureo-album (Haw.) Schwantes

= Cephalophyllum purpureo-album =

Species of succulent

Cephalophyllum purpureo-album is a plant species in the family Aizoaceae, endemic to the Western Cape Province, South Africa.

== Description ==
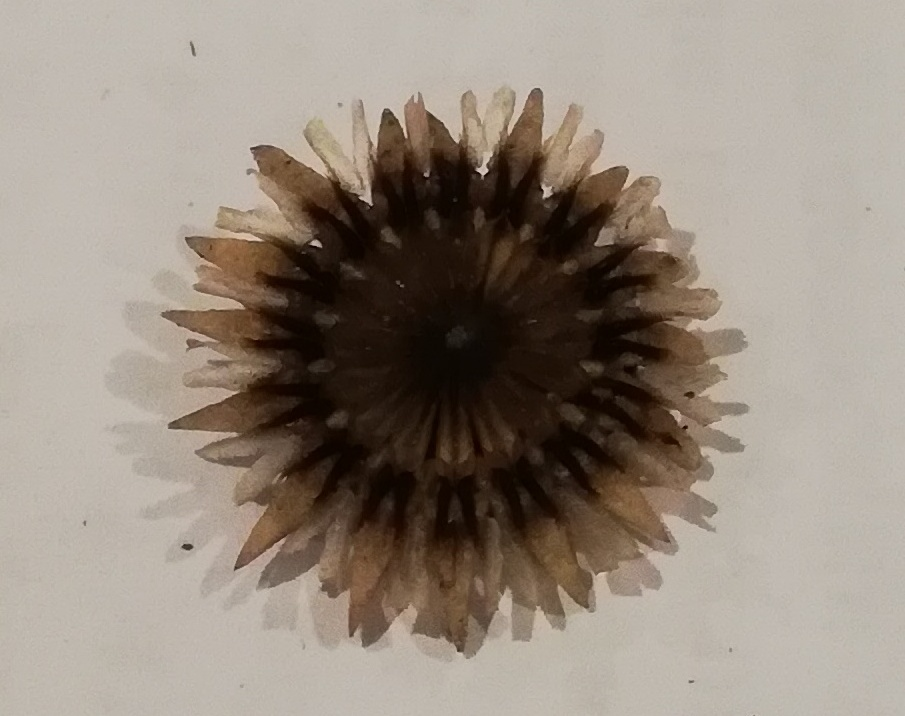
Cephalophyllum purpureo-album, fruit capsule

A compact succulent groundcover, with dark green, slender, slightly cylindrical leaves, and rich, yellow (rarely purple) flowers.

This species develops runners each year, as axes of its inflorescences.

It can be distinguished from its close relative Cephalophyllum diversiphyllum by its more slender, almost cylindrical leaves. In the western parts of its range, where the rainfall is higher, the leaves also tend to be longer and thicker.

== Distribution and habitat ==
This species is endemic to the southern karooid parts of the Western Cape Province, South Africa. It occurs from Worcester in the west, through the Robertson Karoo and western Little Karoo.

Its ecological preference is relatively open or exposed areas in succulent karoo / renosterveld vegetation, usually growing in gravelly sandy-loam, overlaying quartzites or sandstones. The rainfall in its range is between 200 and 400 mm per year.
