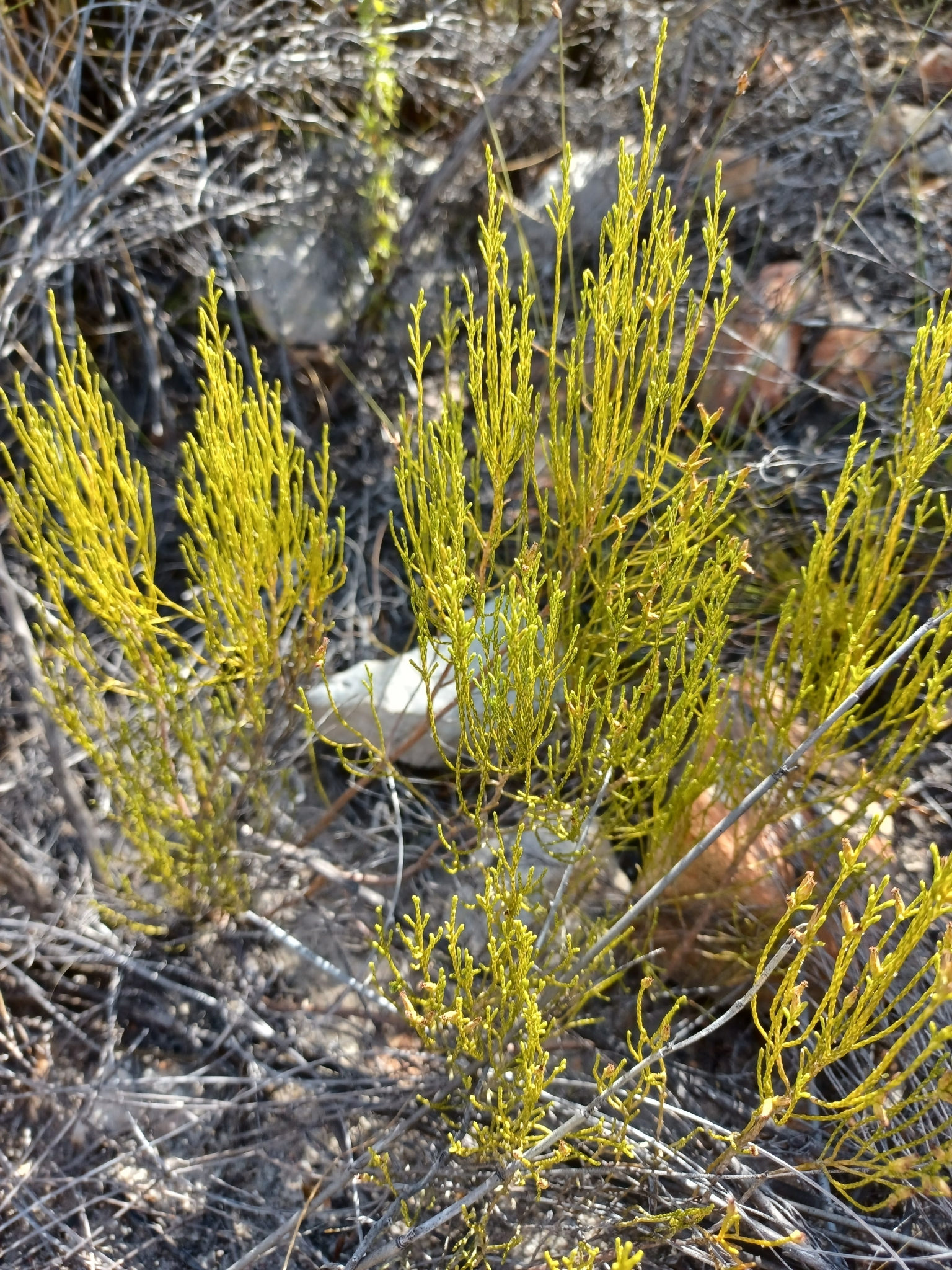

Scientific classification
- Kingdom: Plantae
- Clade: Embryophytes
- Clade: Tracheophytes
- Clade: Spermatophytes
- Clade: Angiosperms
- Clade: Eudicots
- Clade: Asterids
- Order: Asterales
- Family: Asteraceae
- Genus: Dicerothamnus
- Species: D. adpressus

Binomial name
- Dicerothamnus adpressus (Harv.) Koek.

Synonyms
- Elytropappus adpressus Harv.

= Dicerothamnus adpressus =

Species of flowering plant

Dicerothamnus adpressus, synonym Elytropappus adpressus, (commonly known as wyfierenosterbos) is a small shrub that is part of the Asteraceae family. The species is endemic to South Africa. It occurs in the Eastern Cape and the Western Cape, from Clanwilliam to the Cape Peninsula and eastwards to Joubertina. The plant is part of the fynbos.
