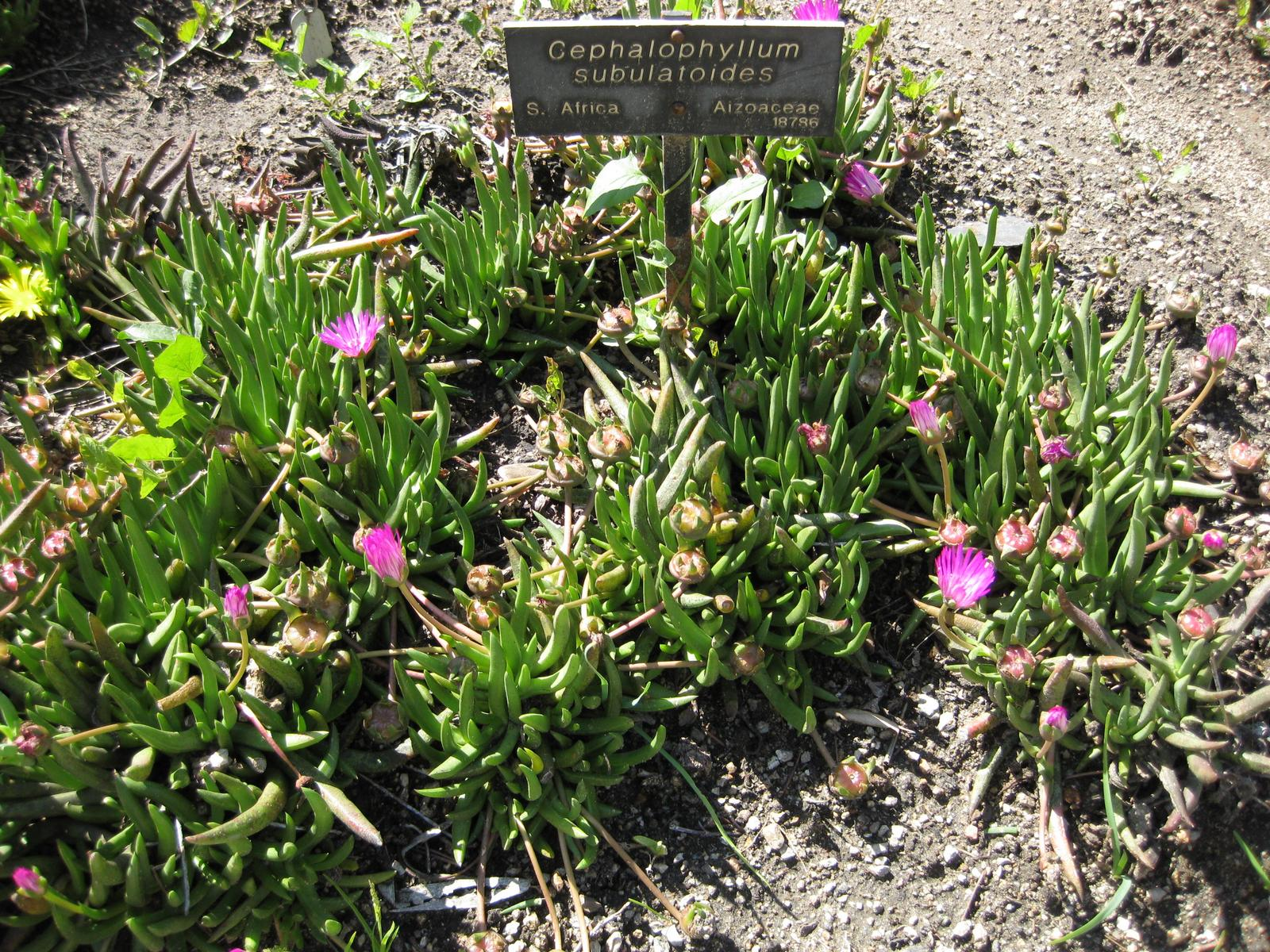

Scientific classification
- Kingdom: Plantae
- Clade: Tracheophytes
- Clade: Angiosperms
- Clade: Eudicots
- Order: Caryophyllales
- Family: Aizoaceae
- Genus: Cephalophyllum
- Species: C. subulatoides

Binomial name
- Cephalophyllum subulatoides (Haw.) N.E.Br.

= Cephalophyllum subulatoides =

Species of succulent

Cephalophyllum subulatoides is a plant species in the family Aizoaceae, endemic to the eastern parts of the Western Cape Province, South Africa.

== Description ==
A compact succulent groundcover, with dark green, acute, triquetrous (triangular in cross-section) leaves, pale-purple flowers, and round fruit capsules that have relatively few locules (c. 12).

The plants have distinctive short, robust rhizomes, and spread this way into the surrounding area.

== Distribution and habitat ==
This species is endemic to the eastern parts of the Western Cape Province, South Africa. Its range extends into the Little Karoo, as far west as the Robertson Karoo.

Its ecological preference is shrubby, mountainous fynbos and renosterveld vegetation, usually growing in humus soils.
