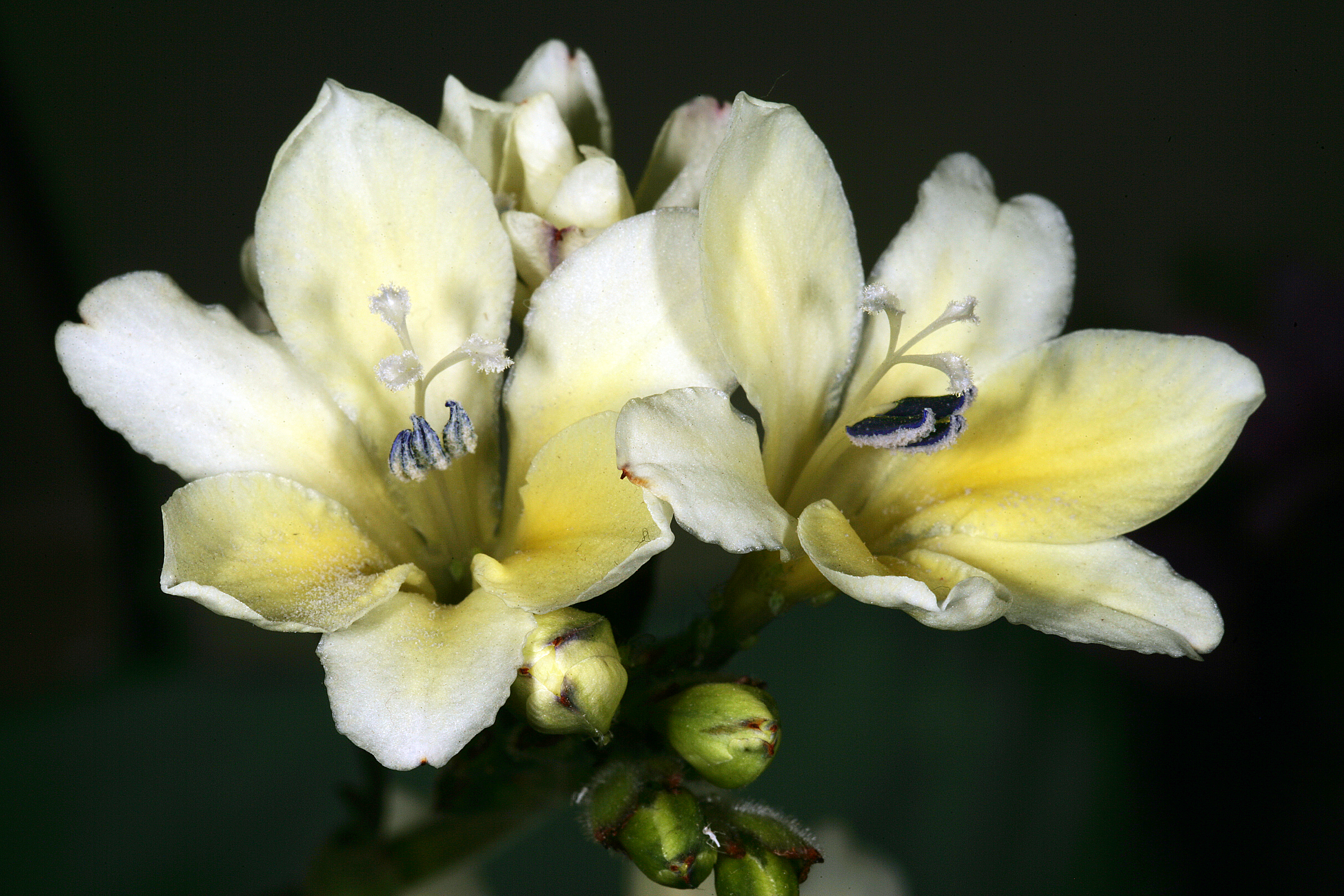

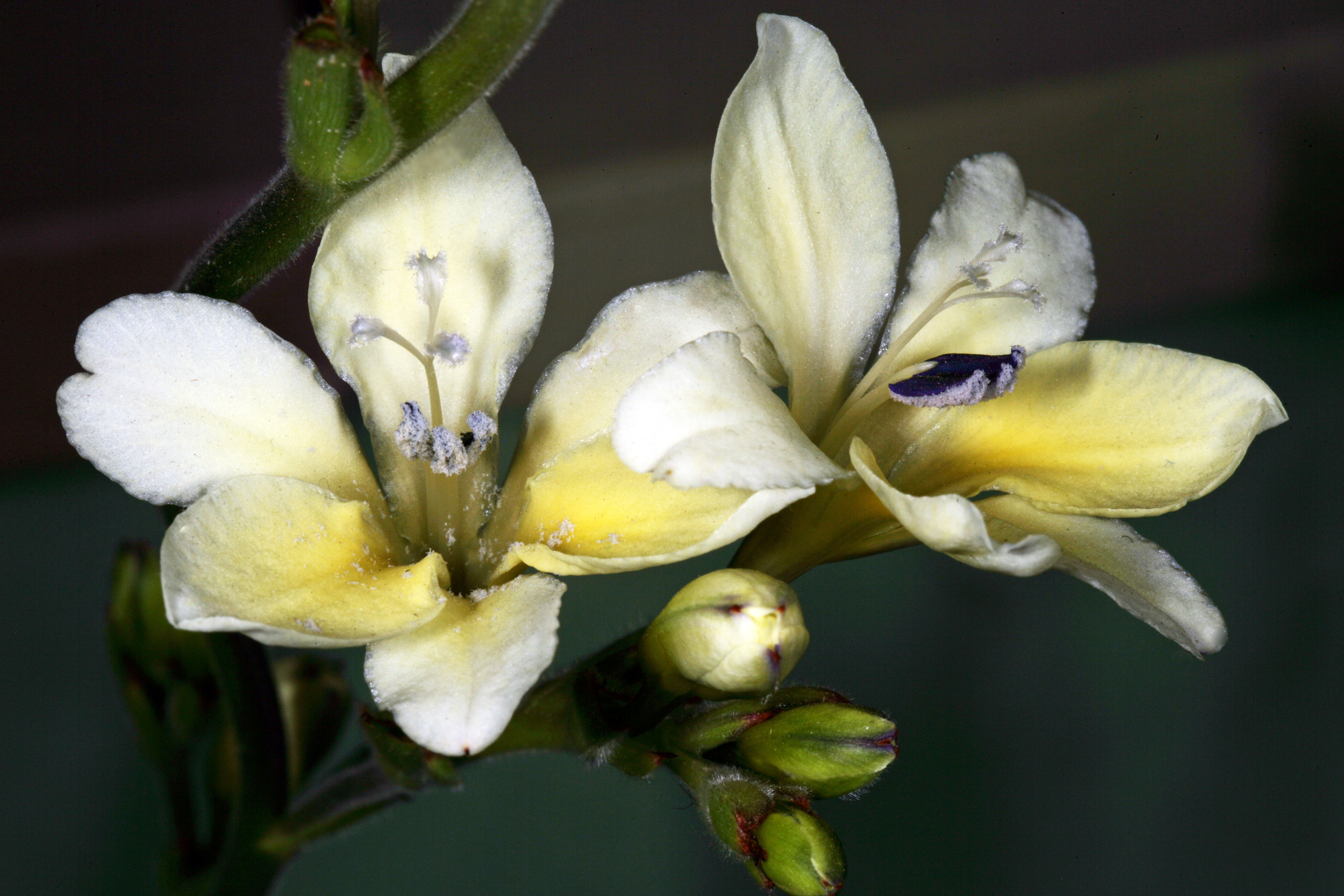

Scientific classification
- Kingdom: Plantae
- Clade: Tracheophytes
- Clade: Angiosperms
- Clade: Monocots
- Order: Asparagales
- Family: Iridaceae
- Genus: Babiana
- Species: B. odorata

Binomial name
- Babiana odorata L.Bolus, (1932)

= Babiana odorata =

Species of flowering plant

Babiana odorata is a perennial flowering plant and geophyte belonging to the genus Babiana and is part of the fynbos and renosterveld. The species is endemic to the Western Cape and occurs from Piketberg to Durbanville. The plant has a range of 3500 km² and has lost large parts of its habitat to grain cultivation and suburban development, especially at Malmesbury and Darling. Invasive plants are also a threat to the remaining subpopulations.
