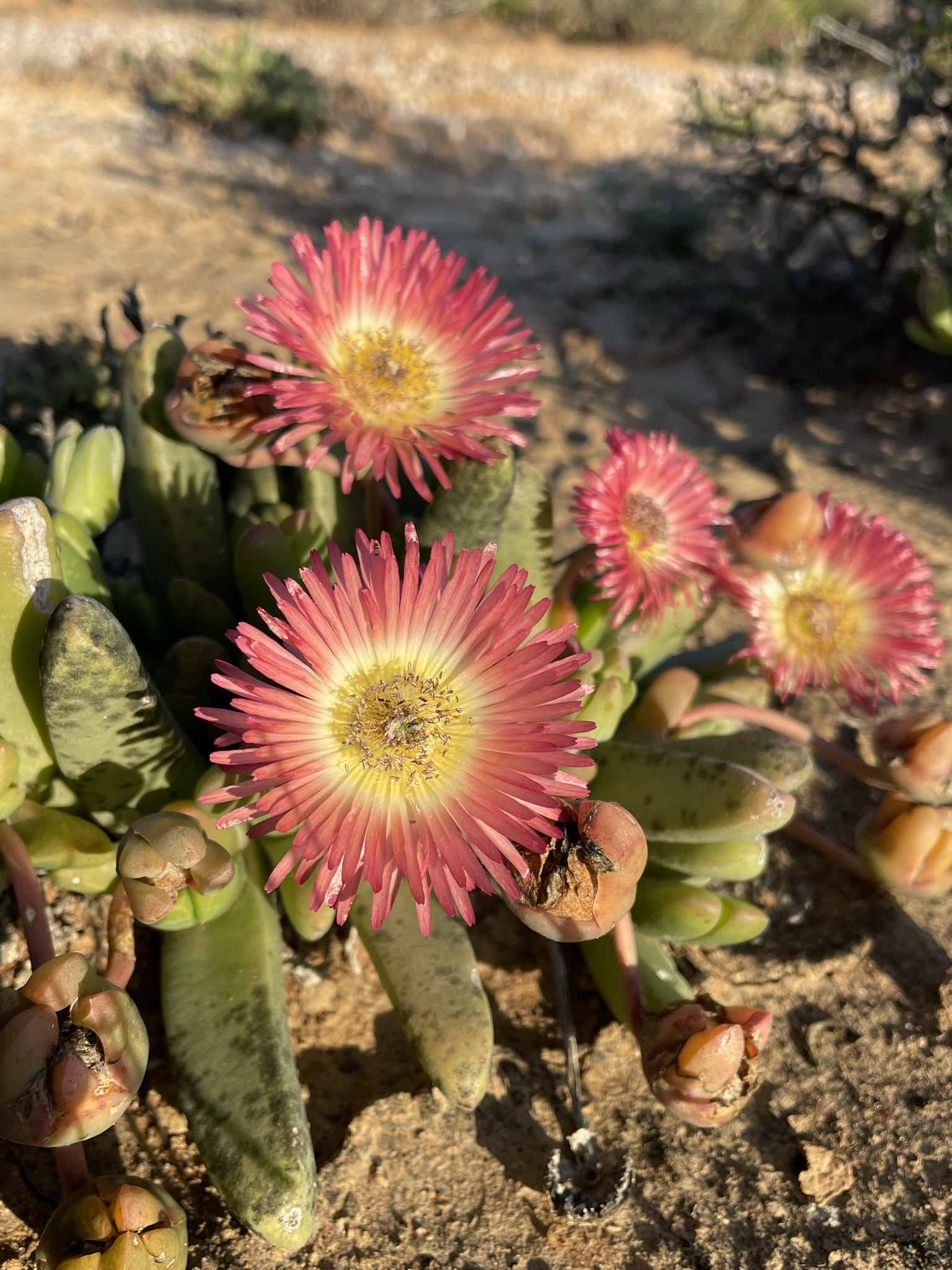

Conservation status
- Least Concern (SANBI Red List)

Scientific classification
- Kingdom: Plantae
- Clade: Tracheophytes
- Clade: Angiosperms
- Clade: Eudicots
- Order: Caryophyllales
- Family: Aizoaceae
- Genus: Cephalophyllum
- Species: C. spissum

Binomial name
- Cephalophyllum spissum H.E.K.Hartmann

= Cephalophyllum spissum =

Succulent endemic to the Cape Provinces

Cephalophyllum spissum is a species of succulent in the family Aizoaceae. It is endemic to the Western Cape.

== Conservation status ==
Cephalophyllum spissum is classified as Least Concern.
