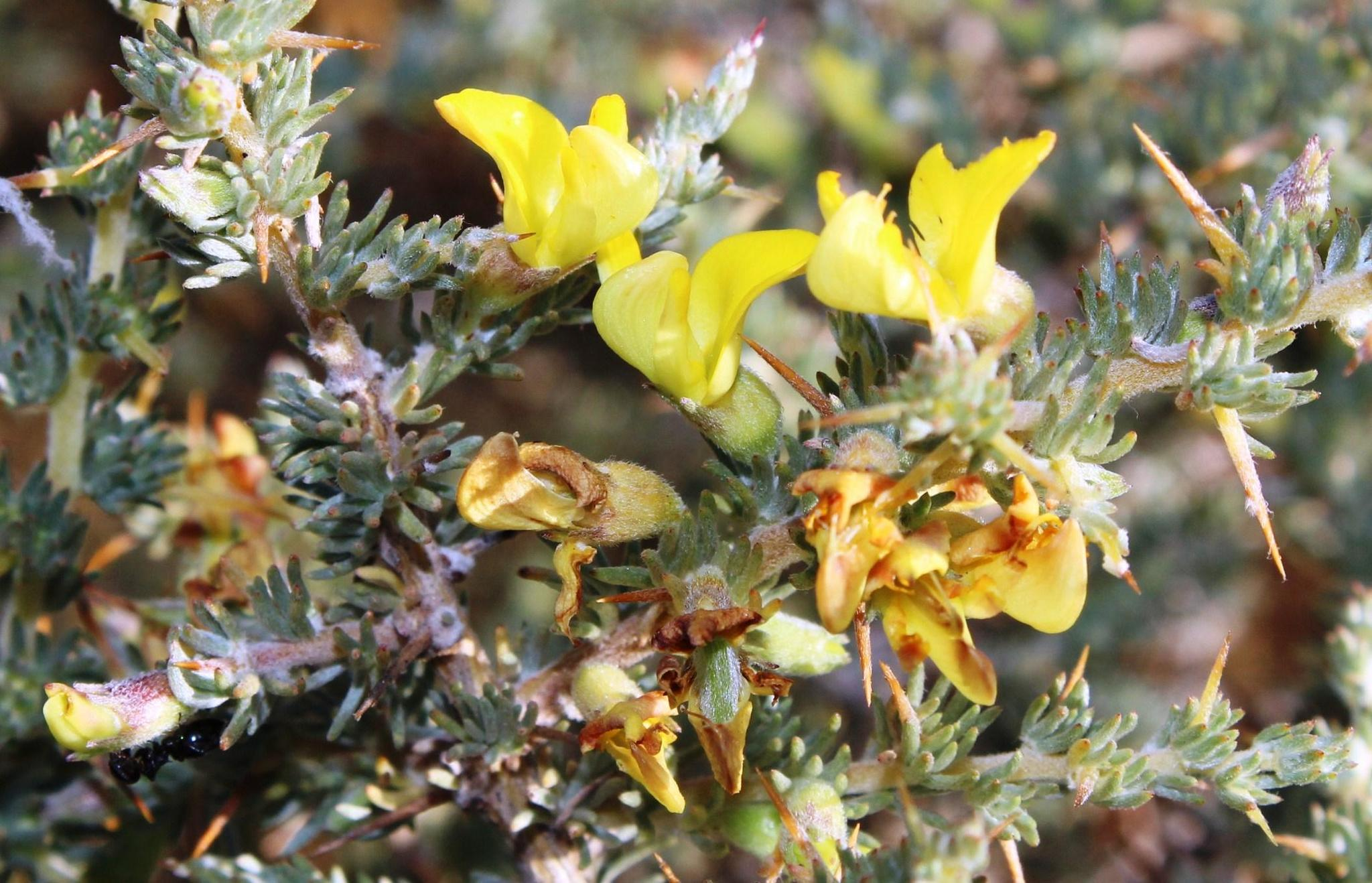

Scientific classification
- Kingdom: Plantae
- Clade: Tracheophytes
- Clade: Angiosperms
- Clade: Eudicots
- Clade: Rosids
- Order: Fabales
- Family: Fabaceae
- Subfamily: Faboideae
- Genus: Aspalathus
- Species: A. acanthophylla

Binomial name
- Aspalathus acanthophylla Eckl. & Zeyh.

Synonyms
- Achyronia chamissonis (Vogel) Kuntze; Aspalathus chamissonis Vogel

= Aspalathus acanthophylla =

Species of plant

Aspalathus acanthophylla, the leafthorn Capegorse, is a shrub belonging to the family Fabaceae. The species is endemic to the Western Cape and forms part of the renosterveld vegetation. It occurs from Hopefield to Tygerberg and has an area of occurrence of 1350 km² and there are nine subpopulations. The plant has already lost 70% of its habitat to crop cultivation in the past 70 years, especially at Malmesbury and Durbanville. Invasive plants and uncontrolled veld fires are a threat.
