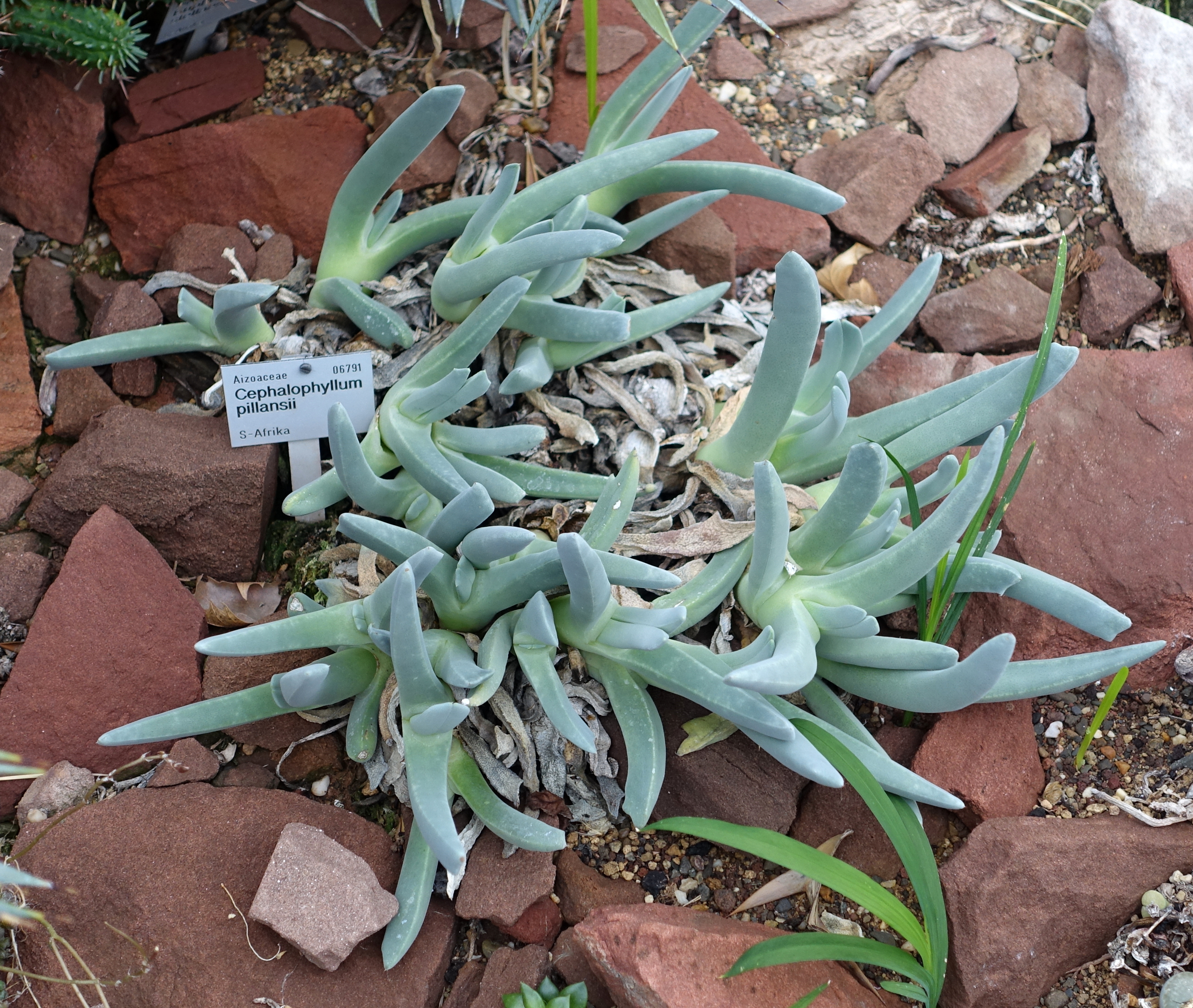

Scientific classification
- Kingdom: Plantae
- Clade: Tracheophytes
- Clade: Angiosperms
- Clade: Eudicots
- Order: Caryophyllales
- Family: Aizoaceae
- Genus: Cephalophyllum
- Species: C. pillansii

Binomial name
- Cephalophyllum pillansii L.Bolus

= Cephalophyllum pillansii =

Species of succulent

Cephalophyllum pillansii is a plant species in the family Aizoaceae, endemic to the western Namaqualand veld in Namibia and South Africa. It has gray-green, succulent leaves, with yellow flowers.
