= Tygerberg Nature Reserve =

Nature reserve in Cape Town, South Africa

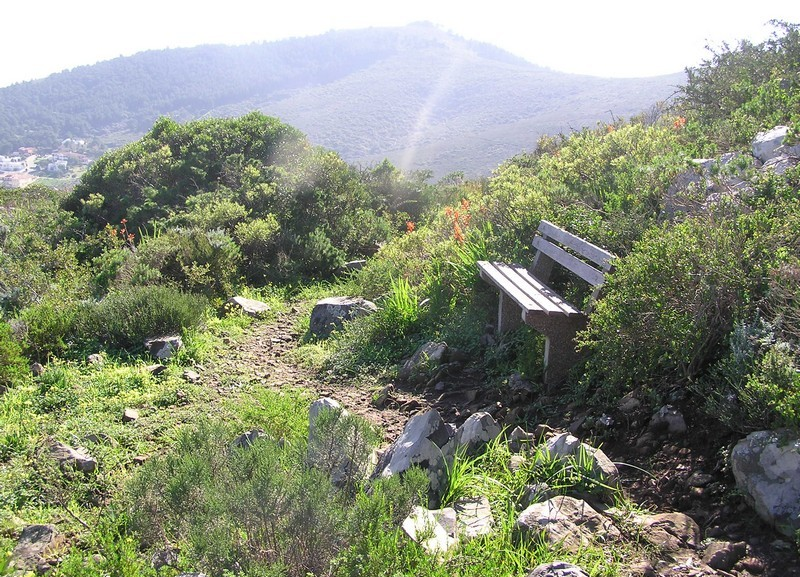
- Walking trail in Tygerberg Nature Reserve

- Location within Cape Town
- Location: Bellville, South Africa
- Coordinates: 33.8783°S 18.5972°E
- Area: 300 ha (740 acres)
- Established: 1973; 53 years ago
- Website: City of Cape Town Nature Reserves

Tygerberg Nature Reserve is a 300-hectare (740-acre) nature reserve in the Tierberg range of hills in the northern suburbs of Cape Town, South Africa.

In 1657 the 7 km long range of hills became known as Luipaerts Berghen (‘Leopard’s Mountain’), named for the characteristic spots, or “heuweltjies”, which dot its slopes and are visible from afar. These are believed to be fossilized termitaria, and occur widely in Shale Renosterveld. Since 1661 the range was known as the Tijgerberghen (‘Tiger Mountain’), "tijger" being the Cape Dutch word for a leopard. The southernmost section of the Tierberg range is currently protected in Tygerberg Nature Reserve.

The nature reserve represents one of the few surviving pockets of the highly threatened Swartland Shale Renosterveld vegetation type. The 300 ha reserve has an exceptional number of species. There are nearly five hundred different plant species here, twelve of which are threatened with extinction and eight of which exist only in Cape Town. Three of the plant species of Tygerberg exist only within the boundaries of the reserve itself. In addition, there are over a hundred bird species and a variety of wild mammals, reptiles and amphibians.

The Plattekloof Dam is located just west of the hills, and is being restored to a natural wetland. The park hosts the Kristo Pienaar Environmental Education Centre with its library and resource centre. This is a popular venue for school excursions and education programmes.

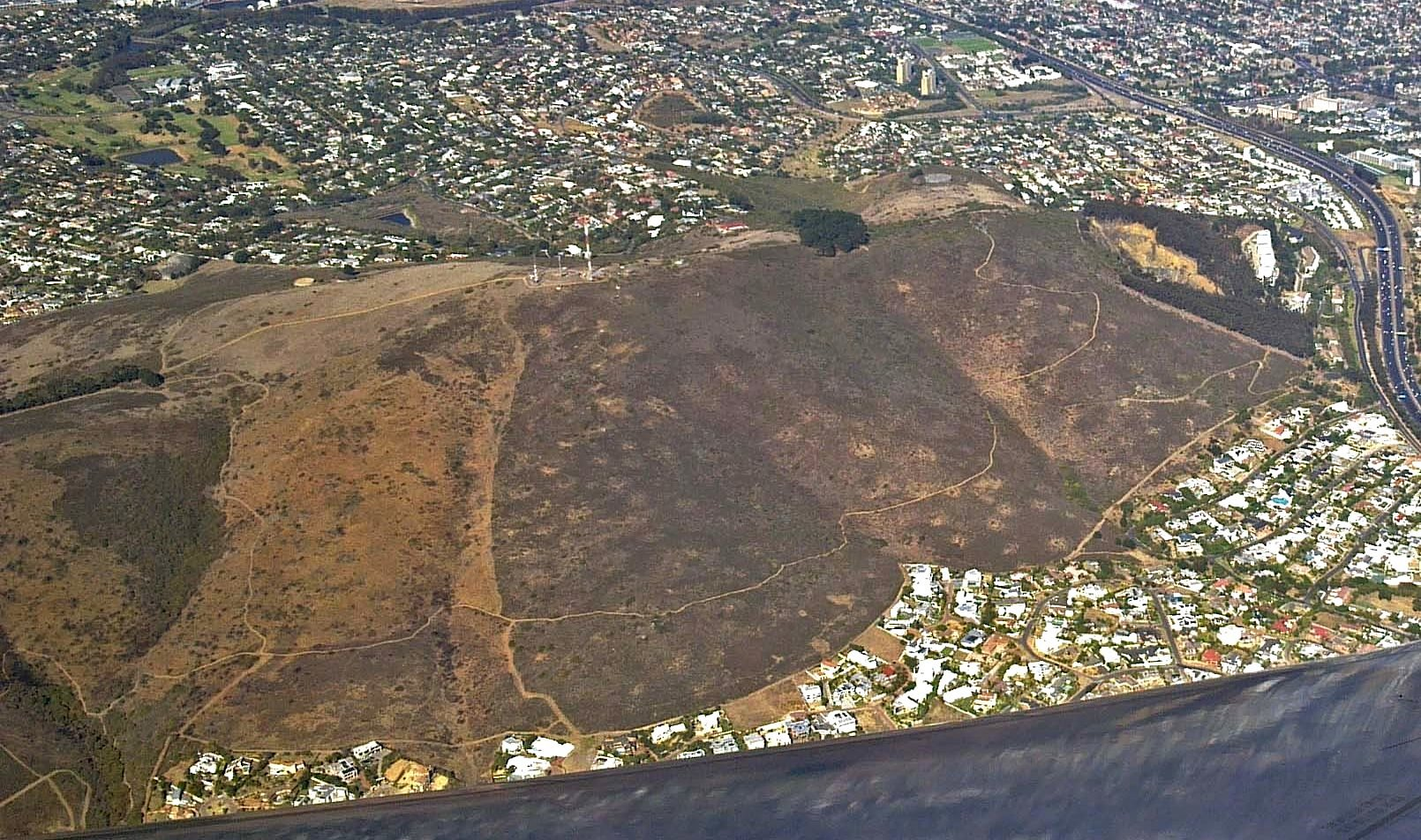
Aerial view: the Plattekloof and Welgemoed (above) suburbs flank the reserve, while the N1 highway skirts the hill's southern limit.

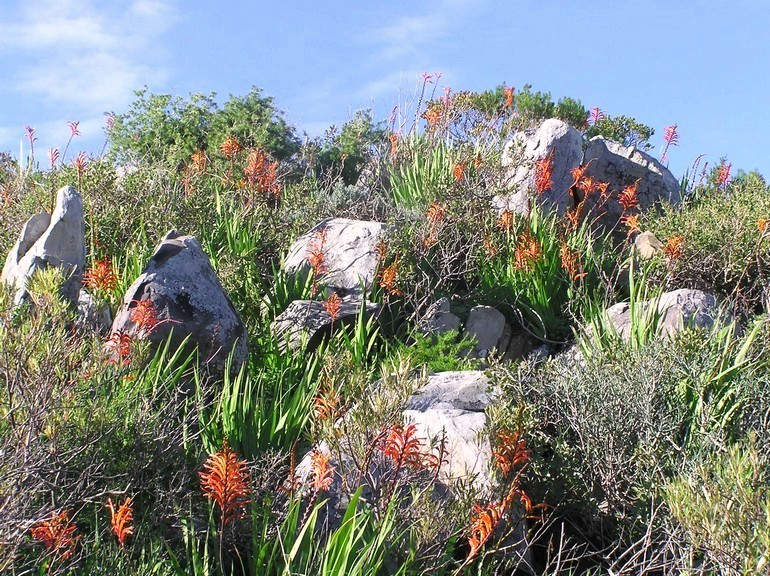
Highly threatened Swartland Shale Renosterveld in Tygerberg Nature Reserve

== See also ==
- Biodiversity of Cape Town
- List of nature reserves in Cape Town
- Swartland Shale Renosterveld
