= Dicerothamnus =

Scientific classification
- Kingdom: Plantae
- Clade: Tracheophytes
- Clade: Angiosperms
- Clade: Eudicots
- Clade: Asterids
- Order: Asterales
- Family: Asteraceae
- Subfamily: Asteroideae
- Tribe: Gnaphalieae
- Genus: Dicerothamnus; Koek.

Genus of plants

Dicerothamnus is a genus of flowering plants belonging to the family Asteraceae.

Its native range is South African Republic.

Species:

- Dicerothamnus adpressus (Harv.) Koek.
- Dicerothamnus rhinocerotis (L.f.) Koek.
