= Moraea tulbaghensis =

Scientific classification
- Kingdom: Plantae
- Clade: Tracheophytes
- Clade: Angiosperms
- Clade: Monocots
- Order: Asparagales
- Family: Iridaceae
- Genus: Moraea
- Species: M. tulbaghensis

Binomial name
- Moraea tulbaghensis L.Bolus

Synonyms
- Iris pavonia L.f.; Moraea neopavonia R.C.Foster; Moraea pavonia Ker Gawl.

Species of flowering plant

Moraea tulbaghensis, commonly known as the Tulbagh peacock moraea or rooiflappie, is a plant and geophyte belonging to the genus Moraea and is part of the fynbos and renosterveld. The species is endemic to the Western Cape and occurs from Tulbagh, Wellington, Piketberg to Paarl. It has lost large parts of its habitat to urban development and crop cultivation, and invasive plants are also a threat.
