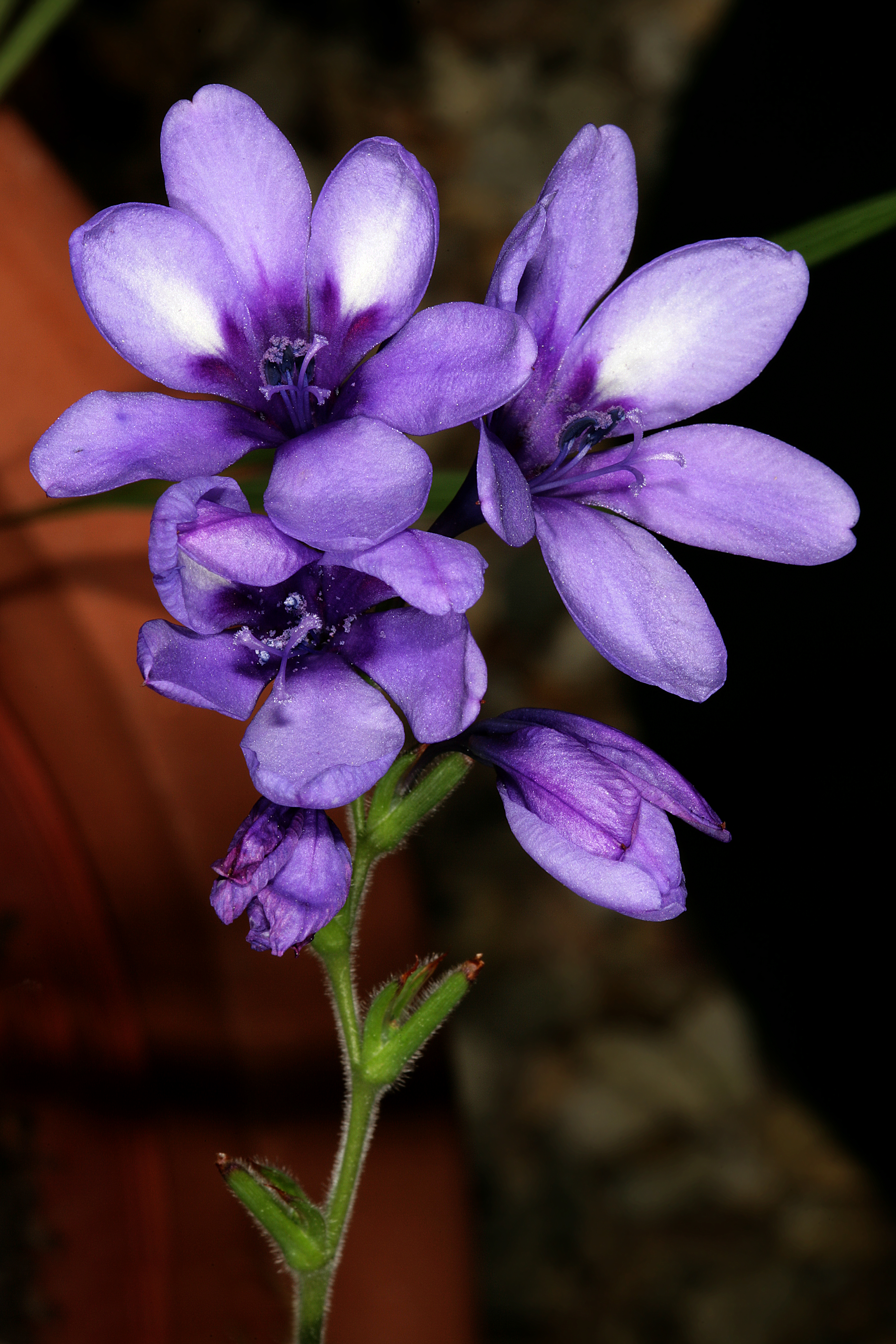

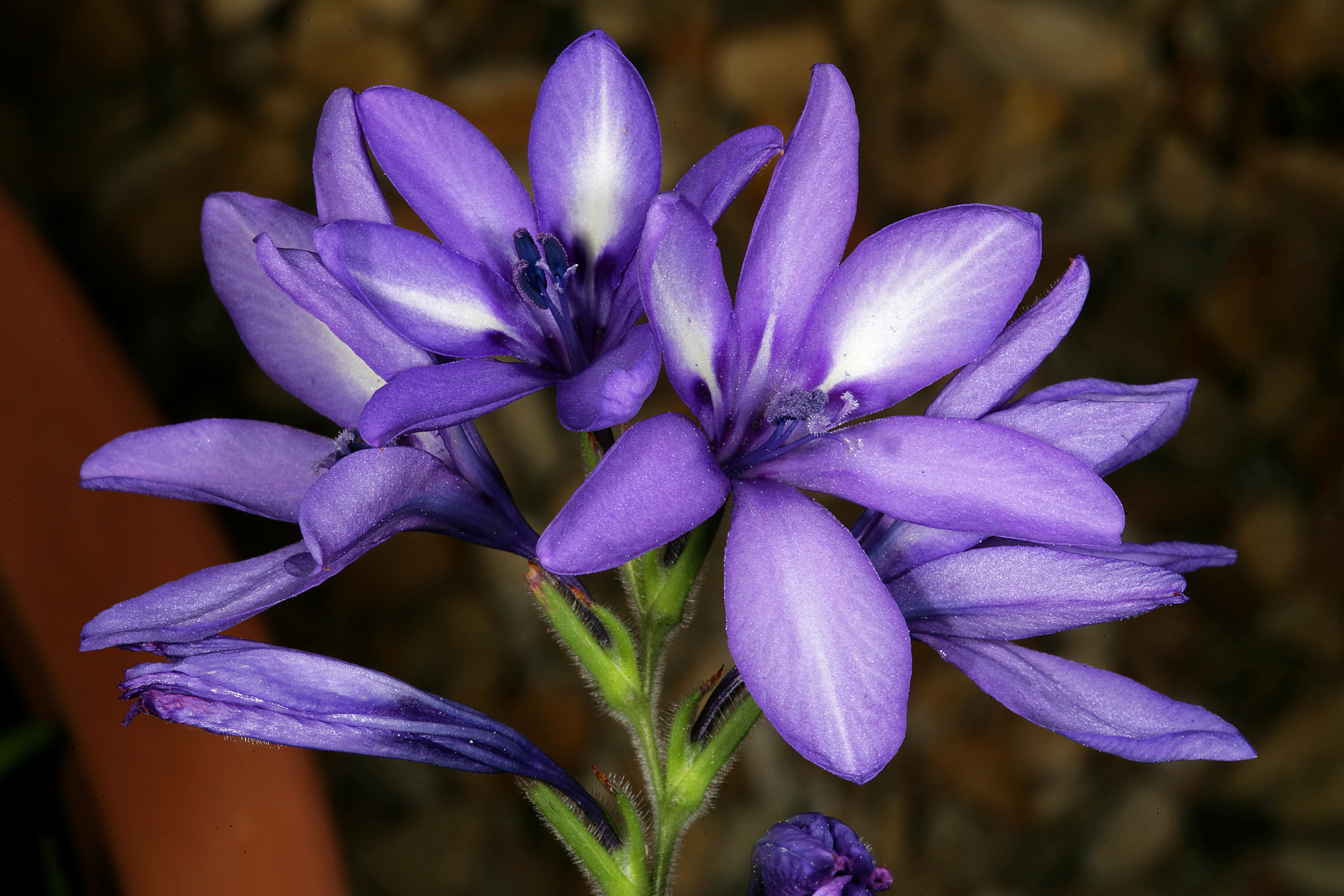

Scientific classification
- Kingdom: Plantae
- Clade: Tracheophytes
- Clade: Angiosperms
- Clade: Monocots
- Order: Asparagales
- Family: Iridaceae
- Genus: Babiana
- Species: B. secunda

Binomial name
- Babiana secunda (Thunb.) Ker Gawl., (1827)

Synonyms
- Babiana reflexa Eckl.; Babiana stricta var. reflexa Baker; Gladiolus secundus Thunb.

= Babiana secunda =

Species of flowering plant

Babiana secunda is a perennial flowering plant and geophyte belonging to the genus Babiana. The species is endemic to the Western Cape and occurs from Hopefield to Paarl. It forms part of the fynbos and renosterveld. Only three of 47 subpopulations remain, the rest having all been lost due to development on the Cape Flats and the planting of orchards and vineyards in the Swartland. The remaining suitable renosterveld available for the plant is smaller than 10 km^{2}.
