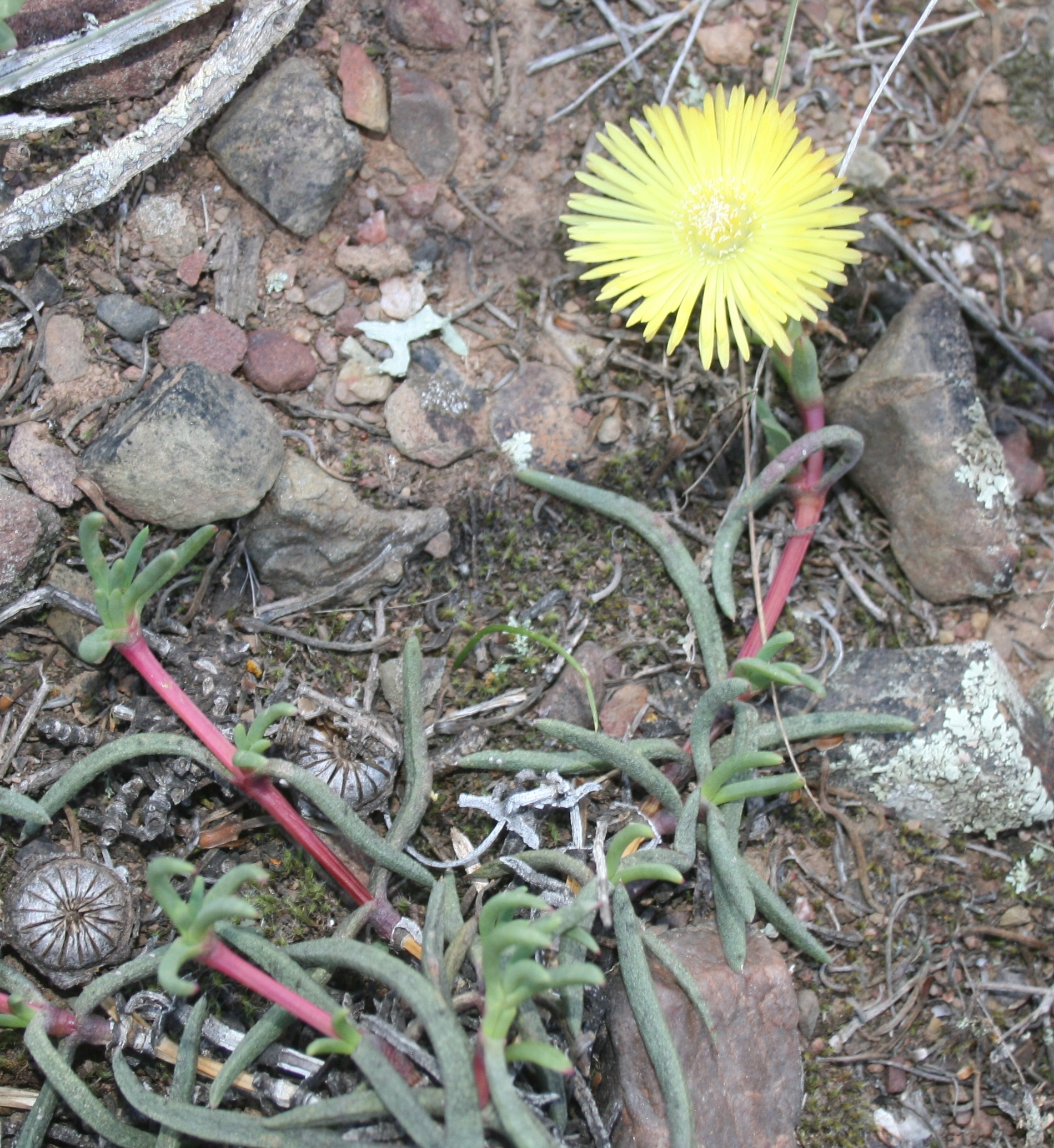
- Cephalophyllum purpureo-album

Scientific classification
- Kingdom: Plantae
- Clade: Tracheophytes
- Clade: Angiosperms
- Clade: Eudicots
- Order: Caryophyllales
- Family: Aizoaceae
- Subfamily: Ruschioideae
- Tribe: Ruschieae
- Genus: Cephalophyllum (Haw.) N.E.Br.

= Cephalophyllum =

Genus of succulents

Cephalophyllum is a genus of flowering plants in the family Aizoaceae. It includes 34 species native to Namibia and the Cape Provinces of South Africa.

== Species ==
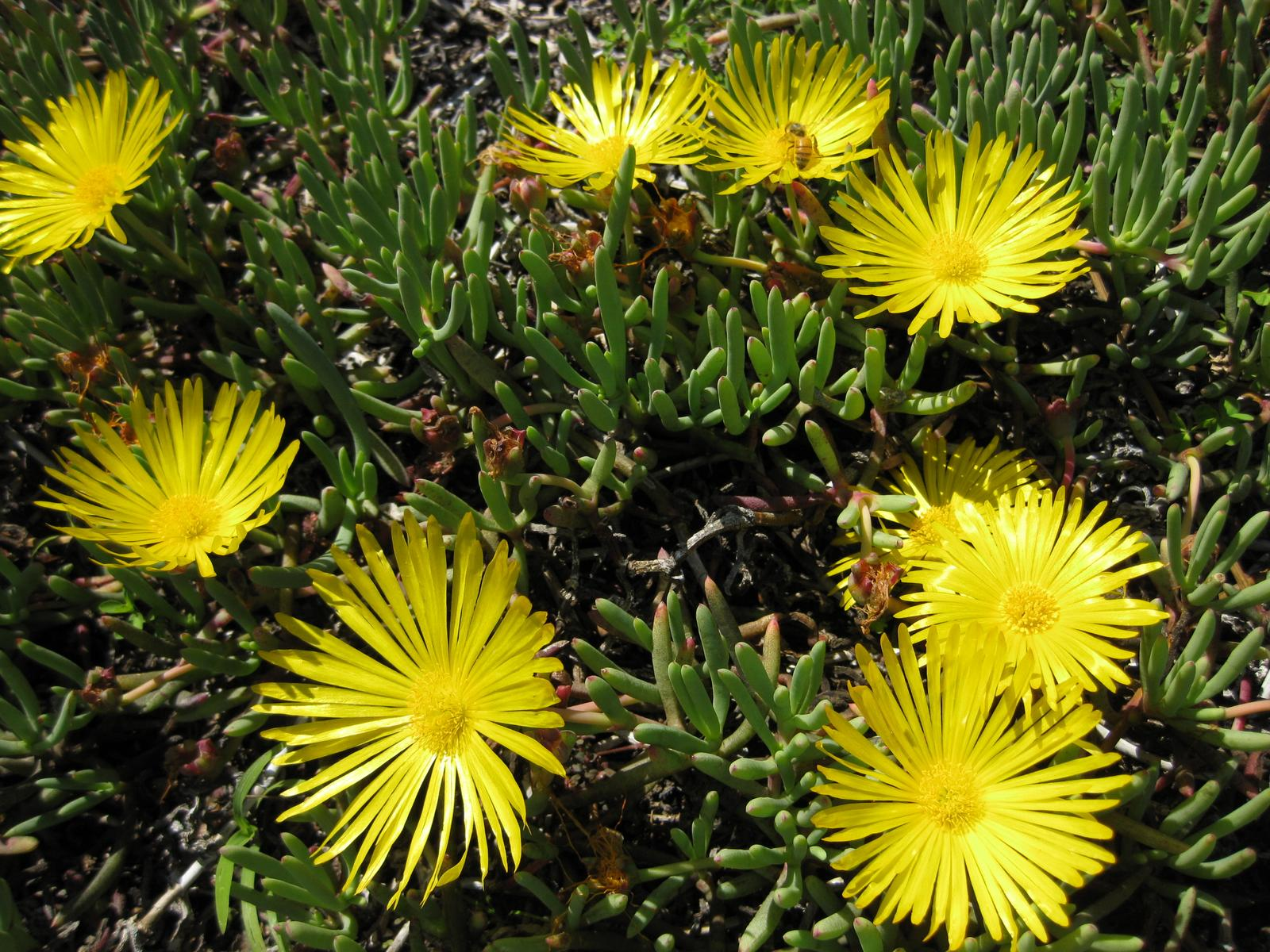
Cephalophyllum frutescens

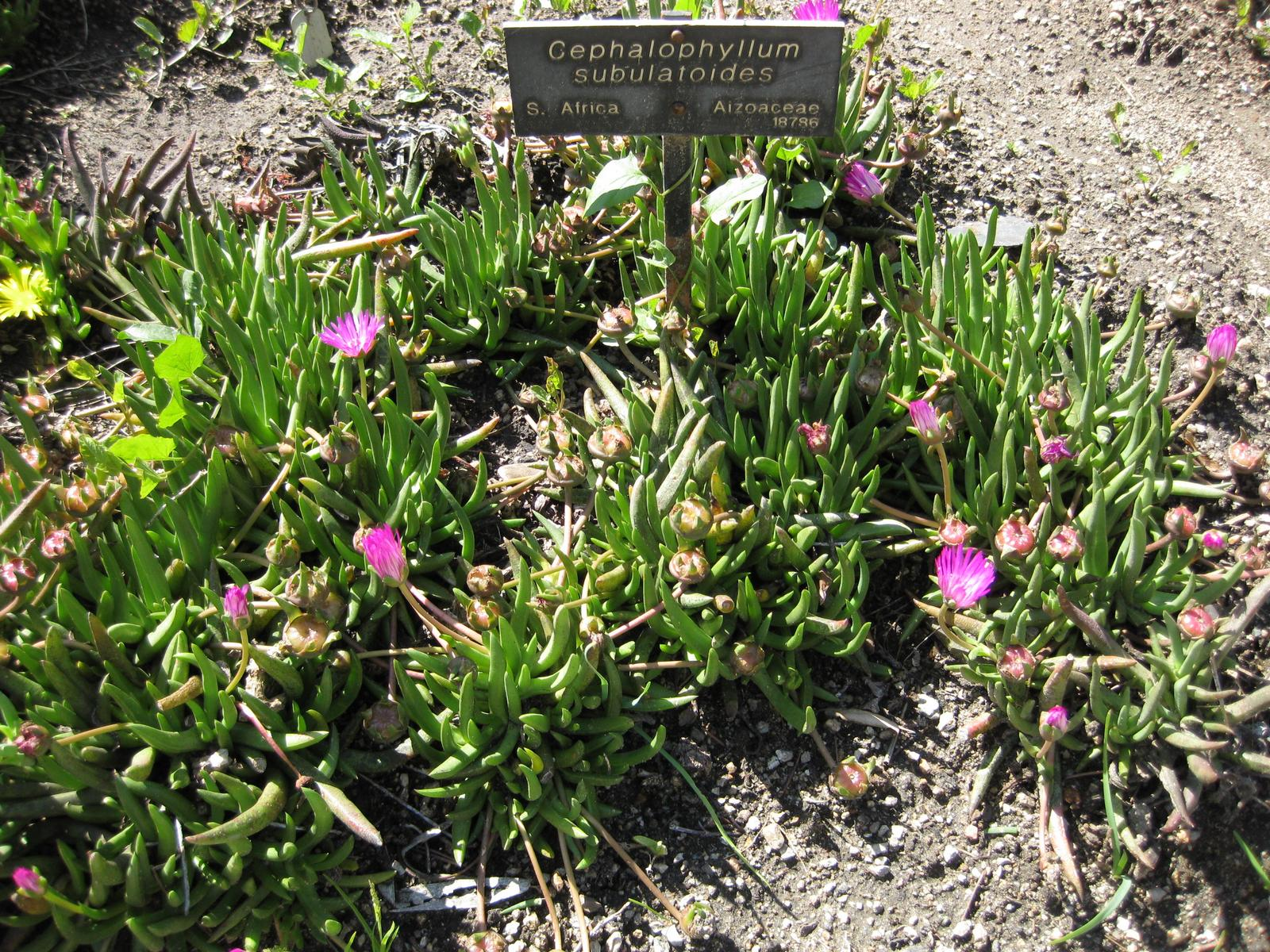
Cephalophyllum subulatoides

34 species are accepted.

- Cephalophyllum alstonii Marloth ex L.Bolus
- Cephalophyllum caespitosum H.E.K.Hartmann
- Cephalophyllum compressum L.Bolus
- Cephalophyllum confusum (Dinter) Dinter & Schwantes
- Cephalophyllum corniculatum (L.) Schwantes
- Cephalophyllum curtophyllum (L.Bolus) Schwantes
- Cephalophyllum diversiphyllum (Haw.) N.E.Br.
- Cephalophyllum ebracteatum (Schltr. & Diels) Dinter & Schwantes
- Cephalophyllum framesii L.Bolus
- Cephalophyllum fulleri L.Bolus
- Cephalophyllum goodii L.Bolus
- Cephalophyllum griseum (S.A.Hammer & U.Schmiedel) H.E.K.Hartmann
- Cephalophyllum hallii L.Bolus
- Cephalophyllum herrei L.Bolus
- Cephalophyllum inaequale L.Bolus
- Cephalophyllum loreum (L.) Schwantes
- Cephalophyllum niveum L.Bolus
- Cephalophyllum numeesense H.E.K.Hartmann
- Cephalophyllum parvibracteatum (L.Bolus) H.E.K.Hartmann
- Cephalophyllum parviflorum L.Bolus
- Cephalophyllum parvulum (Schltr.) H.E.K.Hartmann
- Cephalophyllum pillansii L.Bolus
- Cephalophyllum pulchellum L.Bolus
- Cephalophyllum pulchrum L.Bolus
- Cephalophyllum purpureo-album (Haw.) Schwantes
- Cephalophyllum rangei L.Bolus
- Cephalophyllum regale L.Bolus
- Cephalophyllum rigidum L.Bolus
- Cephalophyllum rostellum (L.Bolus) E.K.H.Hartmann
- Cephalophyllum serrulatum L.Bolus
- Cephalophyllum spissum H.E.K.Hartmann
- Cephalophyllum staminodiosum L.Bolus
- Cephalophyllum subulatoides (Haw.) N.E.Br.
- Cephalophyllum tetrastichum H.E.K.Hartmann
- Cephalophyllum tricolorum (Haw.) N.E.Br.
