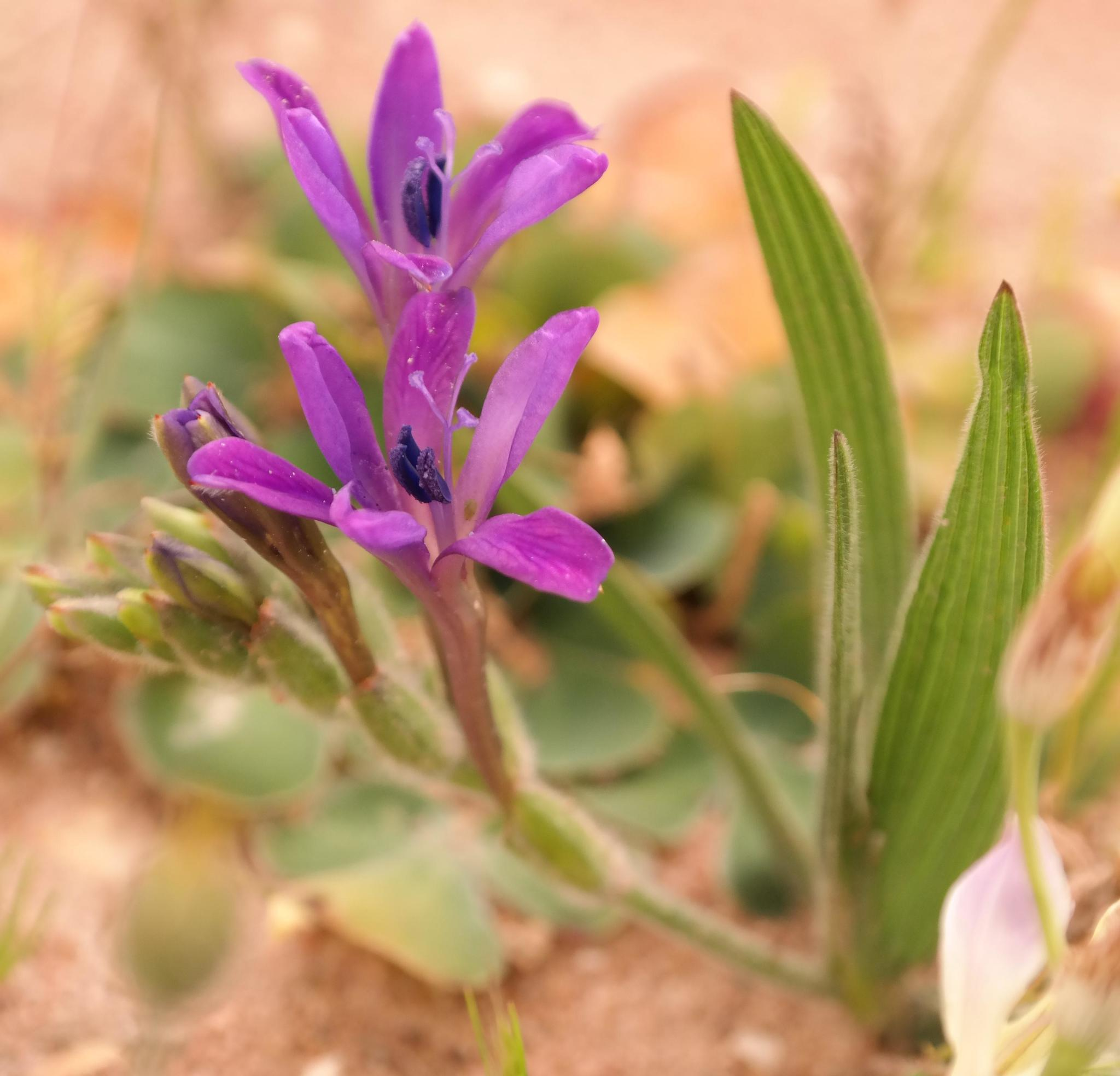

Scientific classification
- Kingdom: Plantae
- Clade: Tracheophytes
- Clade: Angiosperms
- Clade: Monocots
- Order: Asparagales
- Family: Iridaceae
- Genus: Babiana
- Species: B. latifolia

Binomial name
- Babiana latifolia L.Bolus

= Babiana latifolia =

Species of flowering plant

Babiana latifolia is a perennial flowering plant and geophyte belonging to the genus Babiana and is part of the renosterveld. The species is endemic to the Western Cape. It occurs from Piketberg to Piekenierskloof and has a range of 72 km^{2}. Four fragmented subpopulations remain after the species lost 80% of its habitat to crop cultivation. The remaining subpopulations are threatened by overgrazing, invasive plants and uncontrolled fires.
