= Cephalophyllum compressum =

Conservation status
- Least Concern (IUCN 3.1)

Scientific classification
- Kingdom: Plantae
- Clade: Tracheophytes
- Clade: Angiosperms
- Clade: Eudicots
- Order: Caryophyllales
- Family: Aizoaceae
- Genus: Cephalophyllum
- Species: C. compressum

Binomial name
- Cephalophyllum compressum L.Bolus

Species of succulent

Cephalophyllum compressum is a species of plant in the family Aizoaceae. It is endemic to Namibia. Its natural habitats are dry savanna and subtropical or tropical dry shrubland. It is threatened by habitat loss.
