= Cephalophyllum confusum =

Conservation status
- Least Concern (IUCN 3.1)

Scientific classification
- Kingdom: Plantae
- Clade: Tracheophytes
- Clade: Angiosperms
- Clade: Eudicots
- Order: Caryophyllales
- Family: Aizoaceae
- Genus: Cephalophyllum
- Species: C. confusum

Binomial name
- Cephalophyllum confusum (Dinter) Dinter & Schwantes

Synonyms
- Mesembryanthemum confusum Dinter

Species of succulent

Cephalophyllum confusum is a species of plant in the family Aizoaceae. It is endemic to Namibia.
