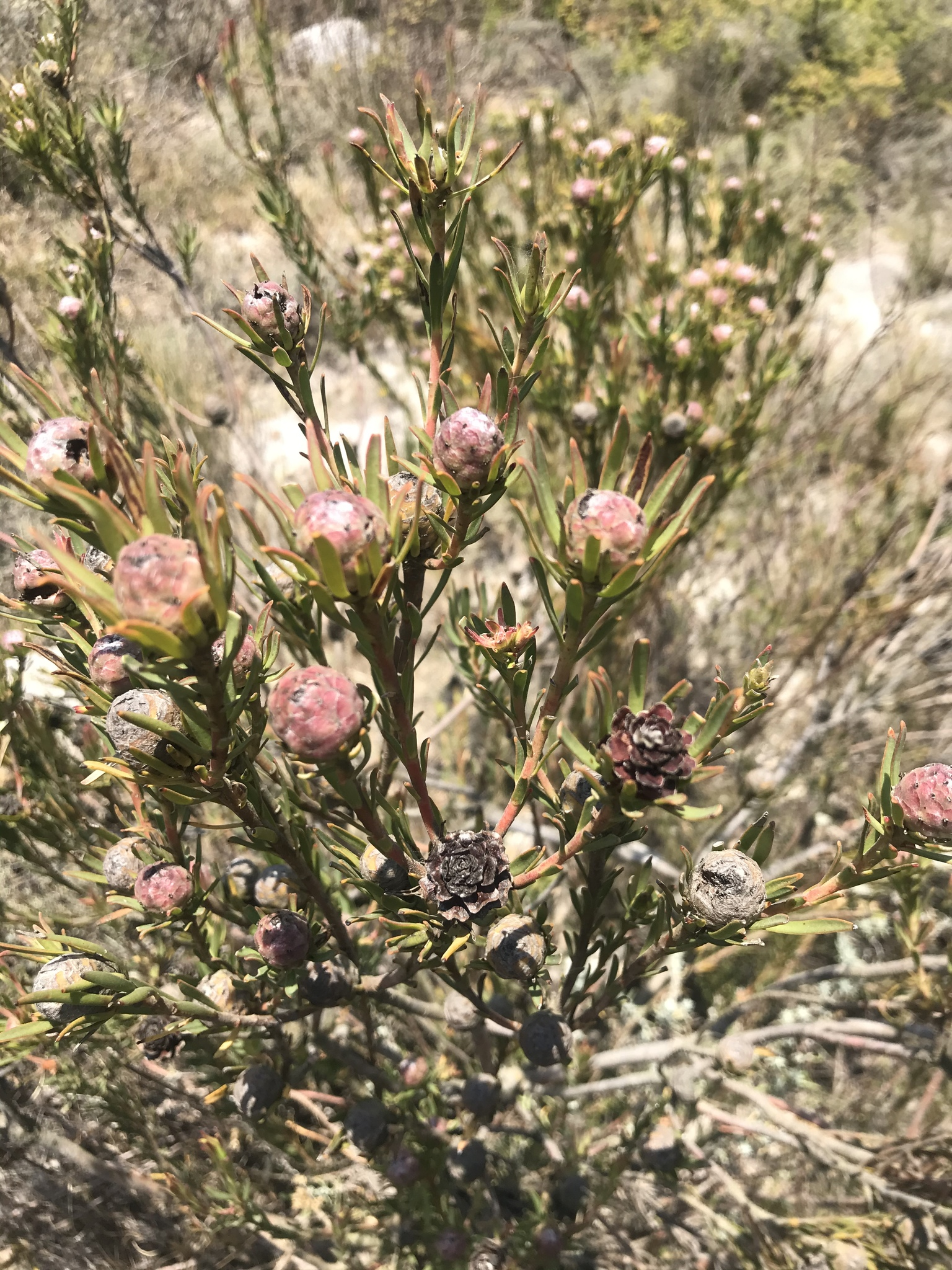

Conservation status
- Critically Endangered (IUCN 3.1)

Scientific classification
- Kingdom: Plantae
- Clade: Embryophytes
- Clade: Tracheophytes
- Clade: Spermatophytes
- Clade: Angiosperms
- Clade: Eudicots
- Order: Proteales
- Family: Proteaceae
- Genus: Leucadendron
- Species: L. verticillatum

Binomial name
- Leucadendron verticillatum (Thunb.) Meisn.

= Leucadendron verticillatum =

Species of plant

Leucadendron verticillatum, the Klapmuts conebush, is a flower-bearing shrub that belongs to the genus Leucadendron and forms part of the fynbos. The plant is native to the Western Cape where it occurs on the Cape Flats at Hercules Pillar, Muldersvlei and Fisantekraal.

The shrub grows 2 m tall and flowers from September to October. The plant dies in wildfires but the seeds survive. The seeds are stored in a cone on the female plant and fall to the ground after a fire. The plant is unisexual and there are separate plants with male and female flowers, which are pollinated by insects. The plant grows mainly on level areas, in dry sand over clay soil at altitudes of 130–150 m.

In Afrikaans it is known as Klapmuts-tolbos.

== Gallery ==
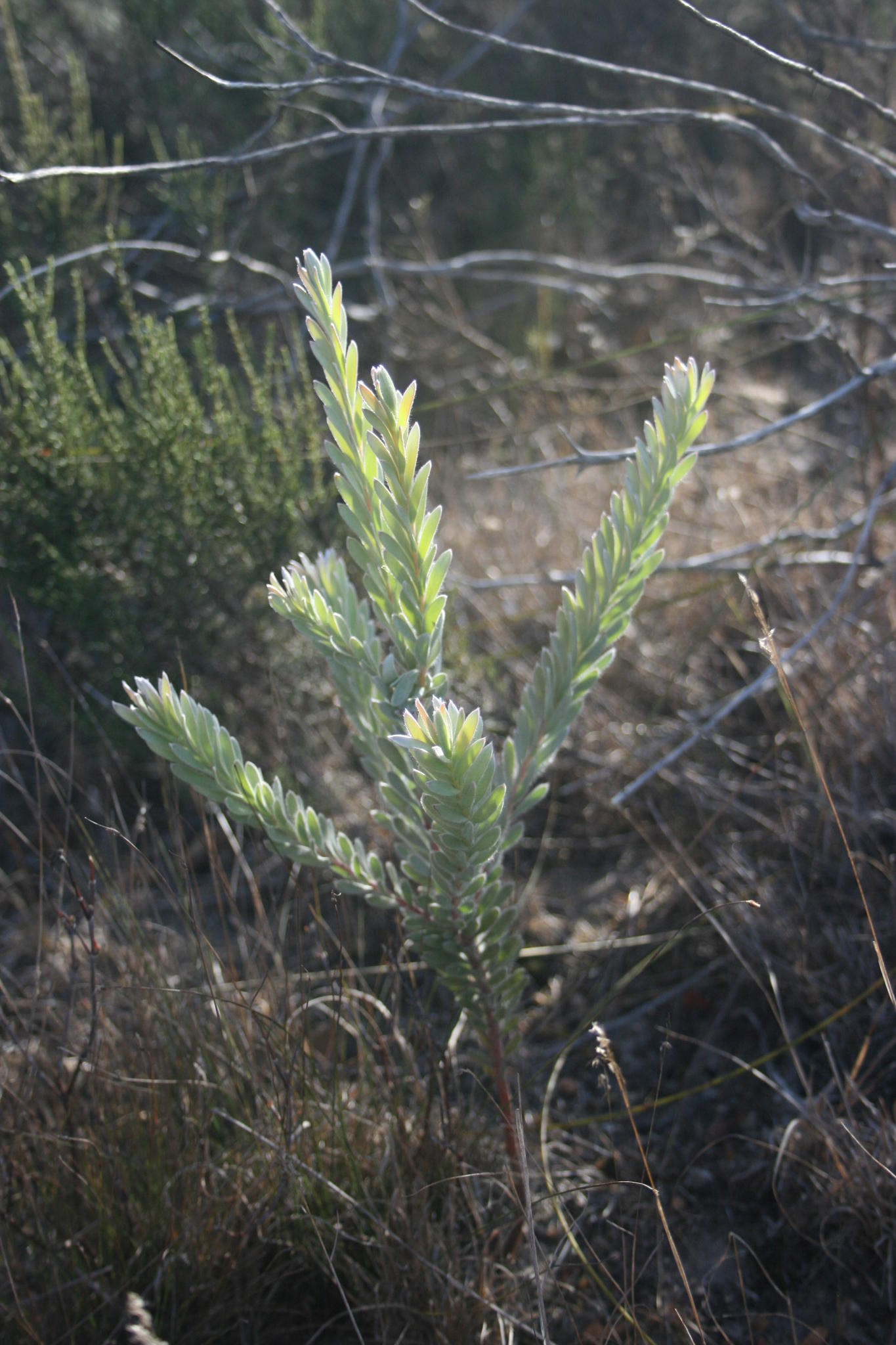

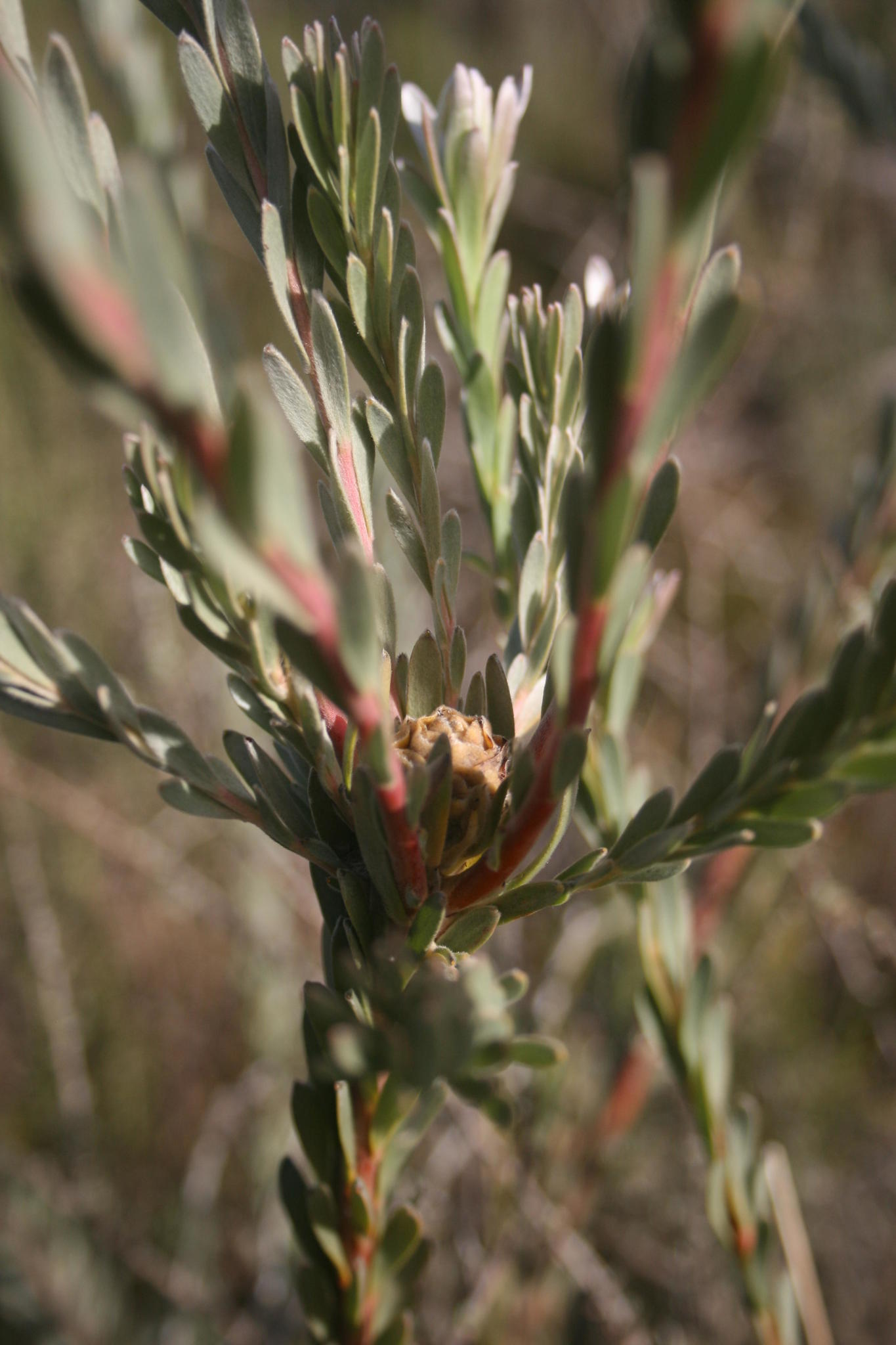

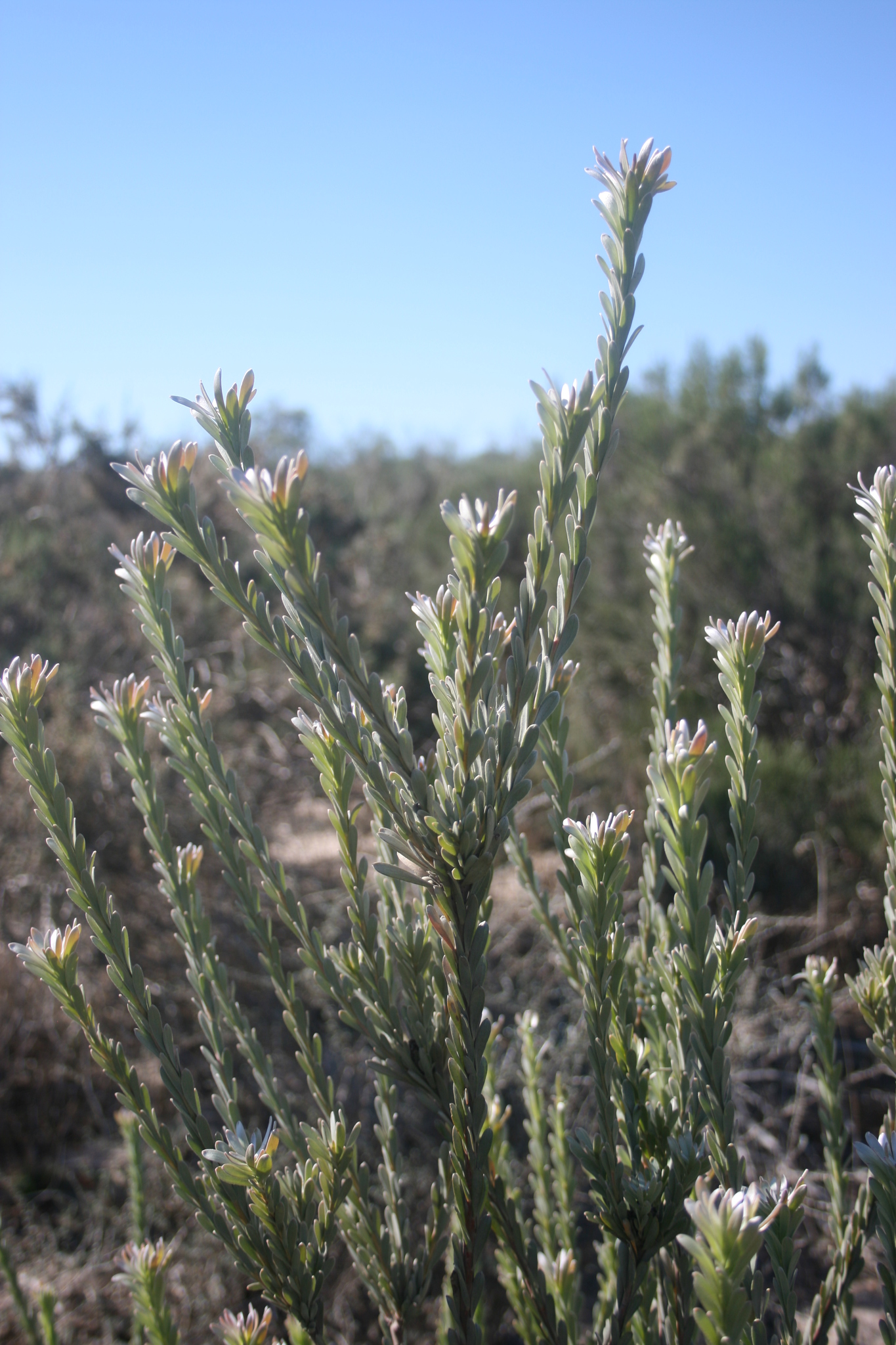

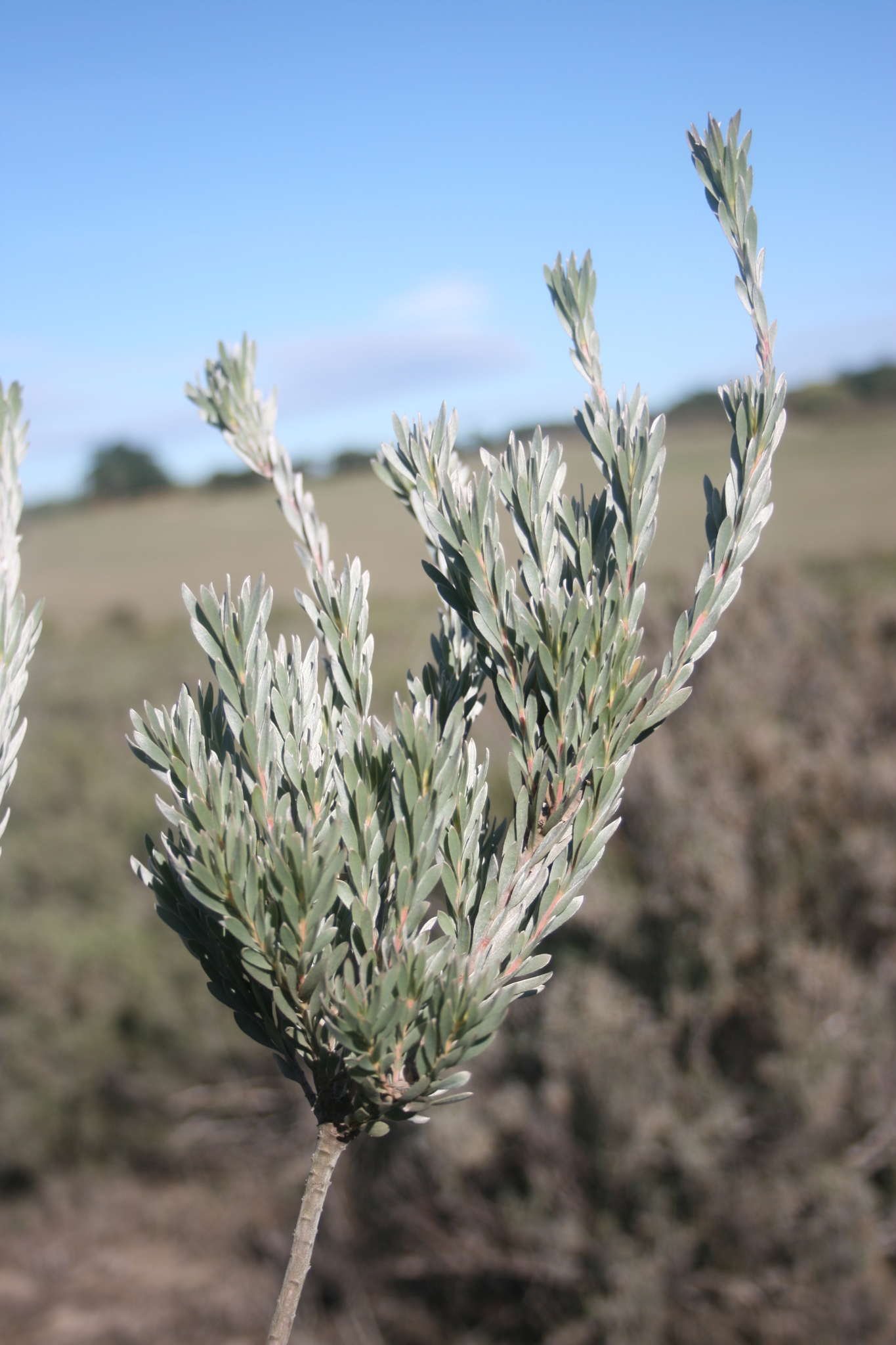
