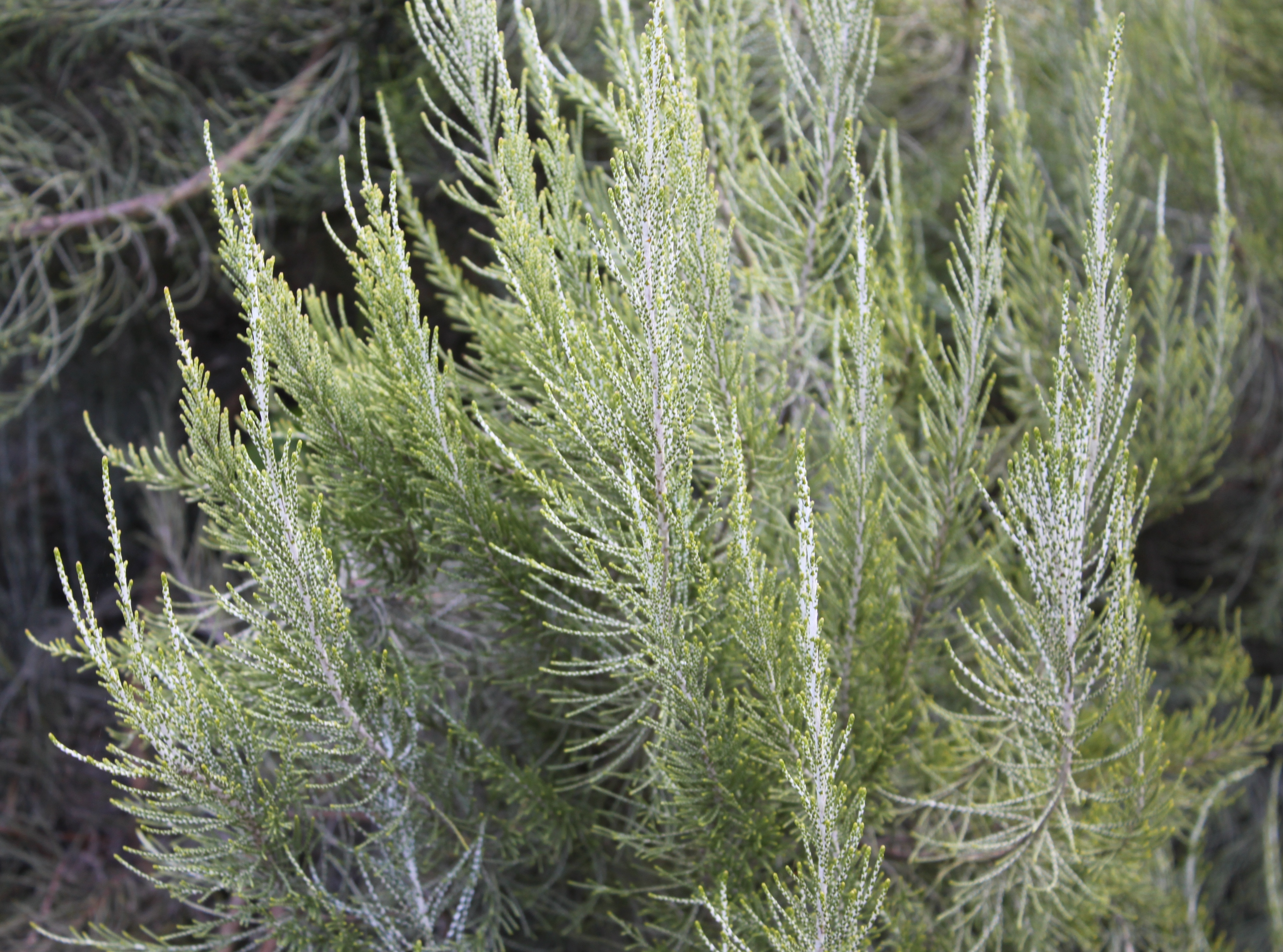

Scientific classification
- Kingdom: Plantae
- Clade: Tracheophytes
- Clade: Angiosperms
- Clade: Eudicots
- Clade: Asterids
- Order: Asterales
- Family: Asteraceae
- Genus: Dicerothamnus
- Species: D. rhinocerotis

Binomial name
- Dicerothamnus rhinocerotis (L.f.) Koek.

Synonyms
- Elytropappus cernuus (Thunb.) Fourc.; Elytropappus rhinocerotis (L.f.) Less.; Helichrysum rhinocerotis Steud., pro syn.; Seriphium adpressum DC.; Seriphium cernuum (Thunb.) Pers.; Seriphium rhinocerotis (L.f.) Pers.; Stoebe adpressa (DC.) DC. ex Harv.; Stoebe cernua Thunb.; Stoebe cupressina Rchb. ex DC.; Stoebe rhinocerotis L.f.

= Dicerothamnus rhinocerotis =

Species of flowering plant

Dicerothamnus rhinocerotis, synonym Elytropappus rhinocerotis, (commonly known as renosterbos or "rhinoceros bush") is a species of flowering plants in the daisy family, Asteraceae, endemic to South Africa. It is a very obvious component of the unique Renosterveld Vegetation Type, which is named after this bush.

== Distribution ==
Although the Renosterveld Vegetation Type is confined to the South-Western Cape of South Africa, the Renosterbos plant is much more widespread - occurring throughout the Cape Floristic Region and further, as far east as Molteno in the Eastern Cape, and as far north as Namibia. Renosterbos is also relatively common in this area, unlike most plants associated with Renosterveld vegetation.

As a consequence of livestock finding the plant relatively inedible, Dicerothamnus rhinocerotis has spread in heavily grazed areas and increased in numbers relative to other (more easily grazed) plants.

== Uses ==
Dicerothamnus rhinocerotis is a medicinal plant in traditional African medicine. The young tips of the branches are used in traditional medicine to treat indigestion and stomach ulcers. The foliage tips are now usually added to wine or brandy for such medicinal consumption.

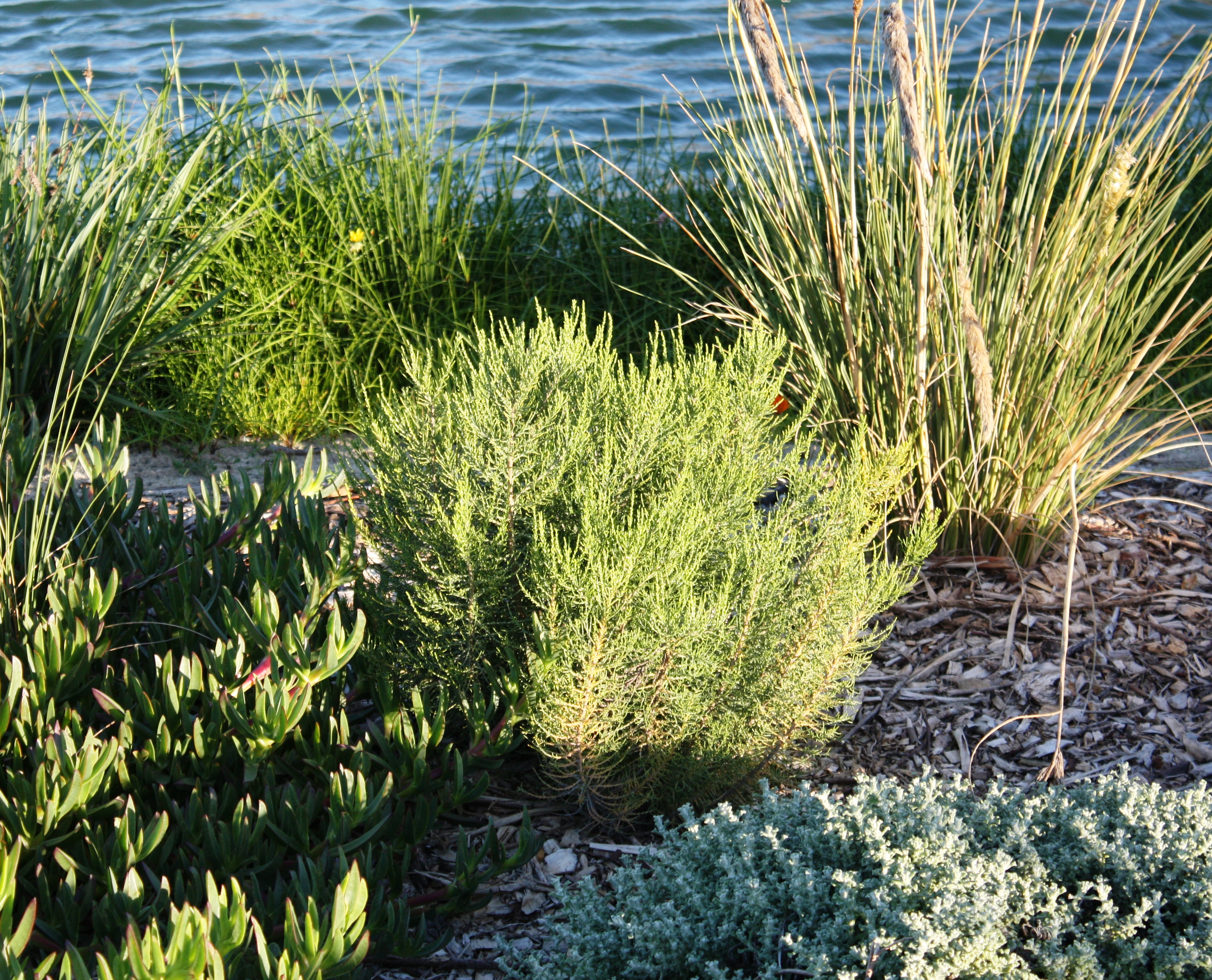
Renosterbos bush (juvenile), in a Cape Town garden.

=== Cultivation ===
Dicerothamnus rhinocerotis is cultivated as an ornamental plant for South African native plant, drought tolerant, and wildlife gardens. It is also planted in natural landscaping and habitat restoration projects.

A cultivar, which has a strikingly crisp, pure-white colour, is usually grown in gardens more than the direct species.
