= Renosterveld =

Vegetation type and plant community of the Cape Floristic Region

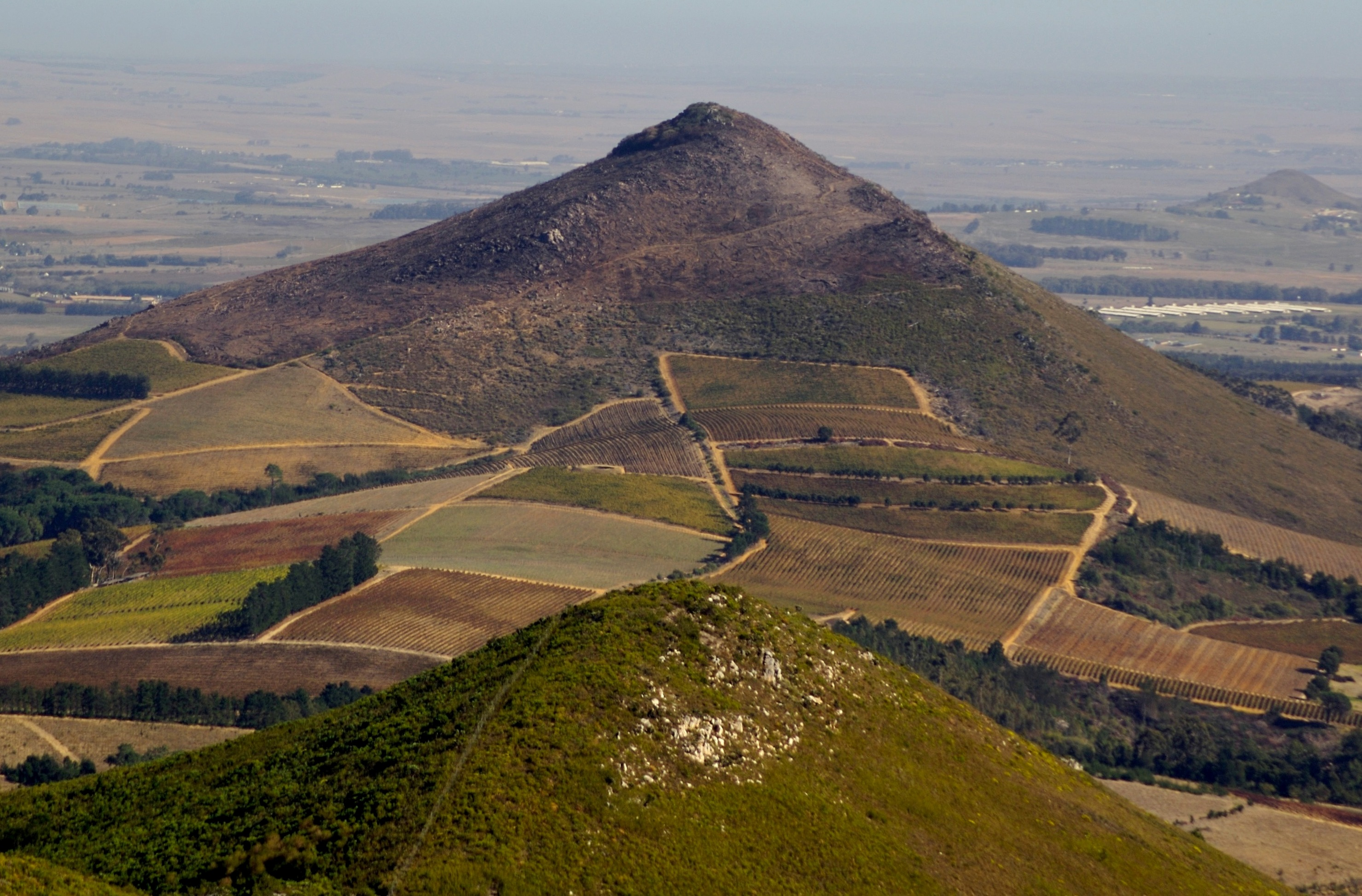
Renosterveld habitat above cultivated fields, Western Cape

Renosterveld is a term used for one of the major plant communities and vegetation types of the Cape Floristic Region (Cape Floral Kingdom) which is located in southwestern and southeastern South Africa, in southernmost Africa. It is an ecoregion of the Mediterranean forests, woodlands, and scrub biome.

== Etymology ==
Renosterveld directly translated in the Afrikaans language means "rhinoceros-field", a possible reference to the high number of rhinoceroses seen by the Afrikaner settlers at the time. It may also derive its name from the renosterbos (rhinoceros bush – Dicerothamnus rhinocerotis), which is a common species of shrub found here. The dull grey colour of renosterbos is similar to the colour of a rhino's hide.

== Geology ==
Renosterveld plants grow on rich soil, which makes them more nutritious than typical fynbos plants. Typically, renosterveld is largely confined to fine-grained soils – mainly clays and silts – which are derived from the shales of the Malmesbury and Bokkeveld Groups and the Karoo Sequence. In drier regions it also occurs on Cape Granite Suite-derived soils.

Renosterveld usually grows in areas that have moderate winter rainfall of 300–600 mm (12–24 in) per year. It can survive relatively frequent fires.

== Characteristics ==
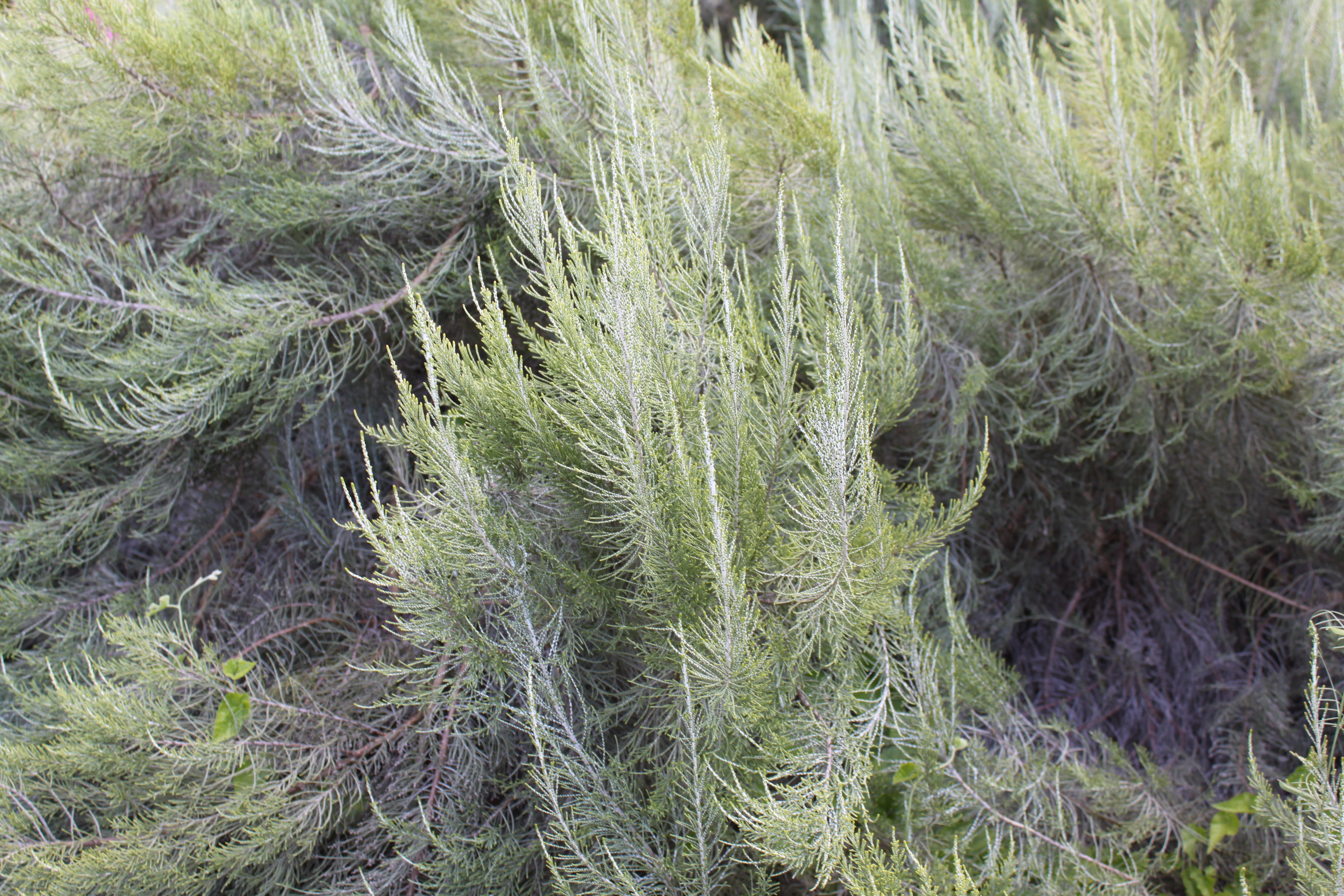
Renosterbos (rhinoceros bush) (Dicerothamnus rhinocerotis)

=== Flora ===
Renosterveld vegetation is dominated by a species of grey-coloured plant called the renosterbos. However, the Proteas, Ericas and Restios — typical of fynbos habitats — tend to occur in very low abundance in renosterveld. Few species are endemic solely to renosterveld vegetation, as most found in renosterveld occur in fynbos as well. However, species endemic to the Cape Floristic Region comprise about one-third of renosterveld plant species, and many of these belong to families which are not considered to be of "Cape affinity" (i.e. these families are also diverse outside the Cape Floral Kingdom).

Typical renosterveld plants include:
Grasses
Themeda triandra
Shrubs and small trees
renosterbos, karee, wild rosemary, wild olive.
Perennials
geophytes from the iris, amaryllis, hyacinth, orchid and other plant families.

==== Uses ====
The original inhabitants of the Western Cape, the San and Khoi, used renosterveld plants for food, medicine and grazing. Because of their relatively small populations and simple lifestyles, they did not cause a great deal of damage to this ecosystem.

Many renosterveld trees and shrubs produce berries, which attract fruit-eating birds (e.g. bulbuls, Cape white-eyes) and other animals (e.g. geometric tortoises, chacma baboons).

During spring, renosterveld flowers attract a wide variety of pollinators, like bees, flies, beetles and sunbirds.

=== Fauna ===
Because of its high soil fertility, it is probable that all the herds of large game in the fynbos biome occurred in renosterveld. Thus mountain zebra, quagga, bluebuck, roan antelope, red hartebeest, eland, bontebok, elephant, black rhino and Cape buffalo were common, as were lion, cheetah, African wild dog, spotted hyena and leopard.

Two of these only ever occurred within the fynbos biome: bluebuck and bontebok. Of these large mammals, only the mountain zebra and leopard survived (by fleeing to the mountains), with the bontebok just surviving near Bredasdorp. All the other species became extinct in the fynbos biome (a tiny relict elephant population still survives in the area around the Gouritz River and surrounding areas within the fynbos biome area), although many have been introduced into conservation areas from outside the region. The quagga and bluebuck are extinct, although there is a project (the Quagga Project) to restore plains zebras with quagga-like markings.

== Threats ==
Original extent of Renosterveld

Original designation and extent of Renosterveld in the Overberg

Original extent of Renosterveld in the Swartland, a related biome
Swartberg shale renosterveld
Swartberg granite renosterveld
Swartberg silcrete renosterveld

The high fertility of renosterveld soils has meant that most of the area has been converted to agriculture, mainly wheat.

It is alleged that the high shrub cover is a result of continuous grazing. Early records suggest that the renosterveld had abundant grasses, and that the game and Khoi cattle migrated over the region. With the establishment of European stock farmers, continuous grazing and the elimination of the diverse grazing-browsing fauna, the shrubby element was promoted. This theory is not universally accepted, but proponents argue to the sudden decline of hay near Cape Town in the early 18th century, and the many historical records of early explorers claiming that renosterbos was taking over and that grass was becoming scarce.

In the Cape Floristic Region, less than 2% of renosterveld vegetation types are formally conserved. These are some of the most threatened types of vegetation in the world.

It seems unlikely that viable populations of large mammals will ever be reintroduced into the fynbos biome for this reason.

== Conservation ==
Conservation organisations and volunteers are working with farmers and municipalities to identify, map and protect the remaining precious areas of renosterveld in the Western Cape. For more information go to:

- http://www.botanicalsociety.org.za
- http://www.capenature.co.za
- http://www.sanbi.org
- http://www.renosterveld.org
- https://www.bartholomeusklip.com
