= List of secondary schools in the Western Cape =

This article contains a list of all secondary schools in the Western Cape province of South Africa.

== Metro Central ==
Metro Central education district.

=== Notable government schools ===
- Alexander Sinton Secondary School
- Athlone Secondary School
- Belgravia Secondary School
- Bridgetown Secondary School
- Camps Bay High School
- Cape Town High School
- Cathkin Secondary School
- Claremont High School
- Crystal Secondary School
- Gardens Commercial High School
- Good Hope Seminary High School
- Groenvlei Secondary School
- Groote Schuur High School
- Holy Cross High School
- Harold Cressy High School
- Heideveld Secondary School
- Ikamvalethu Secondary School
- Isilimela Secondary School
- Jan van Riebeeck High School
- Kensington Secondary School
- Kulani Secondary School
- Langa Secondary School
- Livingstone High School
- Manenberg Secondary School
- Milnerton High School
- Mount View Secondary School
- Ned Doman High School
- Oaklands Secondary School
- Oude Molen Technical High School
- Peak View Secondary School
- Pelican Park High School
- Phoenix Secondary School
- Pinelands High School
- Rhodes High School
- Rondebosch Boys' High School
- Rustenburg Girls' High School
- Rylands High School
- Salt River Secondary School
- Sans Souci Girls' High School
- Sea Point High School
- Silverstream Secondary School
- South African College High School
- Spes Bona High School
- Thandokhulu Secondary School
- Trafalgar Secondary School
- Vista High School
- Voortrekker High School
- Westerford High School
- Windermere Secondary School
- Windsor High School
- Zonnebloem Nest Senior School

=== Notable independent schools ===
- B.E.S.T College (Salt River)
- Cannons Creek Independent School
- Darul Islam Islamic High School
- Deutsche Internationale Schule Kapstadt
- Diocesan College
- Herschel Girls' School
- Herzlia High School
- Michael Oak Waldorf School
- St. Cyprian's School
- St. George's Grammar School

== Metro South ==
Metro South education district.

=== Government schools ===
- Beacon Hill Secondary School
- Bergvliet High School
- Fezeka Secondary school
- Lavender Hill Secondary School
- Masiphumelele High School
- Mondale High School
- Pelican Park High School
- South Peninsula High School
- Spine Road High School
- Wynberg Boys' High School
- Wynberg Girls' High School
- Wynberg Secondary School
- Ikamvalethu Senior Secondary School
- Aloe Secondary School
- I.D Mkize secondary school
- Claremont High School
- Crestway High School
- Focus College
- Fish Hoek High School
- Grassdale High School
- Grassy Park High School
- Heathfield High School
- Livingston High School
- Muizenberg High School
- Norman Henshilwood High School
- Plumstead High School
- Portland Secondary School
- Sibelius High School
- Steenberg Secondary School
- Wittebomme High School
- Vuyiseka Secondary School
- Sinethemba Secondary School
- Sophumelela Secondary School
- The Cape Academy of Mathematics, Science and Technology
- Phakama High School
- Philippi High School
- Phandulwazi High School
- Oscar Mpeta
- Ntsebenziswano Secondary School
- Zeekoevlei High School
- Zwaanswyk High School
- New Eisleben High School

=== Independent schools ===
- American International School of Cape Town

== Metro North ==
Metro North education district.

=== Government schools ===
- Belhar Secondary School
- Bellville High School
- Bosmansdam High School
- DF Akademie
- Durbanville High School
- Fairbairn College
- Fairmont High School
- Milnerton High School
- Sinenjongo High School
- Stellenberg High School
- Table View High School
- Bloubergrant High School
- The Settlers High School
- Tygerberg High School
- Edgmead High School
- Melkbosstrand High School
- Range Secondary School
- Elsies River High School

=== Independent schools ===
- Iqra Academy
- Mountain View Academy
- Parklands College

== Metro East ==
Metro East education district.

=== Government schools ===
- Brackenfell High School
- Chris Hani Secondary School
- Eben Donges High School
- Eersterivier Secondary School
- Hottentots Holland High School
- Monument Park High School
- Parel Vallei High School
- Strand High School
- Forest Heights High School
- Protea Heights Academy
- Uxolo High School

=== Independent schools ===
- False Bay High School

== Cape Winelands ==
Cape Winelands education district.

=== Government schools ===
- Bloemhof High School
- Charlie Hofmeyr High School
- Drostdy Technical High School
- Makupula Secondary School
- La Rochelle Girls' High School
- Paarl Gimnasium
- Paarl Boys' High School
- Paul Roos Gymnasium
- Rhenish Girls' High School
- Stellenbosch High School
- Hex Valley High School
- Labori High School
- Kayamandi High School
- Klein Nederburg Secondary School

=== Independent schools ===
- Bridge House School

== Overberg ==
Overberg education district.

=== Government schools ===
- De Villiers Graaff High School
- Swartberg Secondary School
- Groenberg Secondary School
- Gansbaai Academia
- Hermanus High School
- Overberg High School

== Eden & Central Karoo ==
Eden & Central Karoo education district.

=== Government schools ===
- George Secondary School
- York High School
