= UCT Mathematics Competition =

- Status: Active
- Genre: Mathematics competition
- Frequency: Annually
- Venue: University of Cape Town
- Coordinates: 33°57′27″S 18°27′38″E
- Country: South Africa
- Years active: 1977-present
- Inaugurated: 1977
- Most recent: 2019
- Participants: 7000
- Website: www.uctmathscompetition.org.za

The UCT Mathematics Competition is an annual mathematics competition for schools in the Western Cape province of South Africa, held at the University of Cape Town.

Around 7000 participants from Grade 8 to Grade 12 take part, writing a multiple-choice paper. Individual and pair entries are accepted, but all write the same paper for their grade. The current holder of the School Trophy is Rondebosch Boys High School for the 2024 competition.

The competition was established in 1977 by Mona Leeuwenberg and Shirley Fitton, who were teachers at Diocesan College and Westerford High School, and since 1987 has been run by Professor John Webb of the University of Cape Town.

== Awards ==
=== Mona Leeuwenburg Trophy ===
The Mona Leeuwenburg Trophy is awarded to the school with the best overall performance in the competition.

Recipients of the Mona Leeuwenburg Trophy
Year	School
2025	Rondebosch Boys' High School
2023	Rondebosch Boys' High School
2022	Rondebosch Boys' High School
2021	Diocesan College
2020	-
2019	Rondebosch Boys' High School
2018	Rondebosch Boys' High School
2017	Rondebosch Boys' High School
2016	Rondebosch Boys' High School
2015	Rondebosch Boys' High School
2014	Rondebosch Boys' High School
2013	Diocesan College
2012	Diocesan College
2011	Diocesan College
2010	Diocesan College
2009	Diocesan College
2008	Diocesan College
2007	Rondebosch Boys' High School
2006	Rondebosch Boys' High School
2005	Rondebosch Boys' High School
2004	Rondebosch Boys' High School
2003	Rondebosch Boys' High School
2002	Rondebosch Boys' High School
2001	Diocesan College
2000	Rondebosch Boys' High School
1999	Rondebosch Boys' High School
1998	Rondebosch Boys' High School
1997	Diocesan College
1996	Diocesan College
1995	Diocesan College
1994	Diocesan College
1993	Westerford High School
1992	Diocesan College
1991	Diocesan College
1990	Westerford High School
1989	Diocesan College
1988	Diocesan College
1987	Diocesan College

=== UCT Trophy ===
The UCT Trophy is awarded to the school with the best performance that has not participated in the competition more than twice before.

Recipients of the UCT Trophy
Year	School
2024	Piketberg High School
2023	Mondale High School
2022	Generation Schools
2021	The American International School of Cape Town
2020	-
2019	Curro Hermanus
2018	Thembalethu High School
2017	Glenwood House
2016	Protea Heights Academy
2015	Harry Gwala High School
2014	Darun-Na'im Girls' High School
2013	Intlanganiso Senior Secondary School
2012	Claremont High School
2011	Spine Road High School
2010	The Oracle Academy
2009	Chesterhouse
2008	Darul Arqam Islamic High School
2007	Al-Azhar High School
2006	Elkanah House
2005	Cravenby Secondary School
2004	Reddam House Atlantic Seaboard
2003	Ocean View High School
2002	Reddam House Constantia
2001	Weston Senior School
2000	Worcester Gymnasium
1999	Somerset College

=== Diane Tucker Trophy ===
The Diane Tucker Trophy is awarded to the girl with the best performance in the competition. This trophy was first made in year 2000.

Recipients of the Diane Tucker Trophy
Year	Winner	School
2022	Soyeon Lee	Reddam House Durbanville
2021	Juliette Roux	Herschel Girls' School
2020	-	-
2018	Yewon Kim	Meridian Pinehurst High School
2017	Danielle Kleyn	Parel Vallei High School
2016	SangEun Lee	St George's Grammar School
2015	SangEun Lee	St George's Grammar School
2014	Jane Park	El Shaddai Christian School
2013	Annemiek Meyer	Reddam House Constantia
2012	Lauren Denny	Rustenburg Girls' High School
2011	Khadijah Brey	Wynberg Girls' High School
2010	Emma Belcher	Springfield Convent
2009	Khadija Brey	Wynberg Girls' High School
2008	Maggie Lu	Herschel Girls' School
2007	Melissa Munnik	Hoërskool D F Malan (D F Malan High School)
2006	Melissa Munnik	Hoërskool D F Malan (D F Malan High School)
2005	Melissa Munnik	Hoërskool D F Malan (D F Malan High School)
2004	Gayle Sher	Herzlia Middle School
2003	Marietjie Venter	Hoërskool Stellenbosch (Stellenbosch High School)
2002	Marietjie Venter	Hoërskool Stellenbosch (Stellenbosch High School)
2001	Gayle Sher	Herzlia Middle School
2000	Marietjie Venter	Hoërskool Stellenbosch (Stellenbosch High School)

=== Moolla Trophy ===
The Moolla Trophy was donated to the competition by the Moolla family. Saadiq, Haroon and Ashraf Moolla represented Rondebosch Boys' High School and achieved Gold Awards from 2003 to 2011. The trophy is awarded to a school from a disadvantaged community that shows a notable performance in the competition.

Recipients of the Moolla Trophy
Year	School
2022	Sinenjongo High School
2021	Cape Academy of Mathematics, Science and Technology
2020	-
2019	Intsebenziswano High School
2018	Qhayiya Secondary School
2017	Thembalethu High School
2016	Percy Mdala High School
2015	Spine Road High School
2014	South Peninsula High School
2013	COSAT
2012	Manyano High School

=== Lesley Reeler Trophy ===
The Lesley Reeler Trophy is awarded for the best individual performance over five years (grades 8 to 12).

Recipients of the Lesley Reeler Trophy
Year	Winner	School
2022	Emmanuel Rassou	South African College Schools
2021	Justin Botes	Elkanah House
2020	-	
2019	Adri Wessels	Curro Durbanville
2018	Timothy Schlesinger	Rondebosch Boys' High School
2017	Abdullah Karbanee	Rondebosch Boys' High School
