= Franklin Sonn =

South African diplomat (1939–2025)

Franklin Sonn GCOB
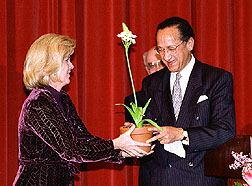
- Sonn, right, presenting a lily to second lady of the United States Tipper Gore in 1997
- Born: 11 October 1939; Vosburg, Cape Province, South Africa
- Died: 15 November 2025 (aged 86)
- Occupations: Educator, diplomat, businessman
- Known for: South Africa's first democratic ambassador to the United States
- Spouse: Joan Heather Gelderbloem
- Children: 2

Franklin Abraham Sonn, GCOB (11 October 1939 – 15 November 2025) was a South African educator, diplomat and businessman who played a significant role in the country's transition from apartheid to democracy. He was South Africa's first ambassador to the United States under a democratic government, serving from 1995 to 1999. Sonn also held leadership positions in education, business, and civil society, and has been recognized for his contributions to justice, education, and economic empowerment.

== Early life ==
Sonn was born in Vosburg in the Karoo region of the Cape Province, and raised in Queenstown and Cape Town. His parents were both educators.

== Career in education ==
Sonn began as a teacher and became principal of Spes Bona High School in Athlone in 1974. In 1978, he was appointed rector of Peninsula Technikon in Cape Town, a post he held until 1994. He also served as president of the Cape Teachers' Association and chaired the Committee of Technikon Principals. Sonn contributed to commissions of inquiry into education and chaired a ministerial working group to establish a single distance learning institution in South Africa. He served as chancellor of the University of the Free State from 2002 to 2009.

== Political and diplomatic career ==
Sonn's legacy is possessed of a longstanding history of community activism, and despite not having been a member of the ANC while it was banned during Apartheid, he led marches alongside Archbishop Desmond Tutu and during Nelson Mandela's imprisonment, Sonn maintained correspondence with Mandela through regular letter exchanges. He led the ANC campaign in the Western Cape region in the 1994 election. In 1992, Sonn served on Jimmy Carter's team to monitor the elections in Zambia. In 1995, President Nelson Mandela appointed Sonn as South Africa's ambassador to the United States, making him the first black South African ambassador to the United States. He served until 1999, working to strengthen bilateral relations and represent the new democratic South Africa. He published an autobiography, Karooseun van Vosburg, in 2024.

== Business career ==
Sonn co-founded New Africa Investments Limited (NAIL), a black-led company listed on the Johannesburg Stock Exchange. He was on the boards of ABSA Group, Sappi, Steinhoff International, Pioneer Foods, and Macsteel Holdings. He also was a non-executive director for MTN Group and Nedbank, and chairman of the Airports Company of South Africa and African Star Ventures.

== Personal life and death ==
Sonn was married to Joan Heather Gelderbloem. They had two children, Crispin, and Heather. He died on 15 November 2025, at the age of 86.

== Honours and recognition ==
He was awarded the Order of the Baobab in Silver for his contributions to education and justice. He also received the Order of the Disa, and the Dr. Martin Luther King Award for International Service for Peace. Sonn's received twelve honorary doctorates from institutions such as Howard University, Baruch College of the City University of New York, the University of Cape Town, and Medunsa.
