= Dallen =

Dallen is both a surname and a given name. Notable people with the name include:

- Russ Dallen (1963–2021), British financial advisor, economist, journalist and writer
- Dallen Bentley (born 2000), American football player
- Dallen Bounds (1971–1999), American serial killer
- Dallen Stanford (born 1979), American rugby union player and commentator
