= Texas Geographical Union =

American rugby union division

Texas Rugby Union
- Abbreviation: Texas RU; TRU
- Formation: 2013
- Region served: Arkansas; Louisiana; Oklahoma; Texas, United States of America
- President: Dave McPhail

The Texas Rugby Union (TRU) is the Geographical Union (GU) for rugby union teams playing in Texas and portions of Arkansas, Louisiana, and Oklahoma for USA Rugby. It is a non-profit organization and is the primary overseeing body for the promotion of rugby union in the region.

The TRU is divided into four divisions: Men, Women, college men, and College Women.

== Men's clubs ==
=== Division 1 ===
- Austin Blacks
- Austin Huns
- Dallas Harlequins
- Dallas Rugby
- Houston Athletic

2016-2017 Standings
Team	GP	W	L	T	PF	PA	PD	BT	BL	FF	PTS
Dallas Rugby	5	4	1	0	268	83	185	4	1	0	21
Austin Blacks	6	4	2	0	218	180	38	5	0	0	21
Austin Huns	5	4	1	0	247	88	159	4	0	0	20
Dallas Harlequins	6	1	5	0	111	296	-185	3	0	0	7
Houston Athletic	6	1	5	0	96	293	-197	1	0	0	5

=== Division 2/D1b ===
- Alamo City Rugby
- Austin Blacks D2
- Austin Huns D2
- Dallas Athletic
- Dallas Harlequins D2
- Dallas Rugby D2
- Euless Texans
- Fort Worth Rugby
- Houston Athletic D2
- Houston United
- Katy Lions
- San Antonio Rugby
- The Woodlands Rugby

2016-2017 Standings

1B
Team	GP	W	L	T	PF	PA	PD	BT	BL	FF	PTS
Austin Blacks D2	6	5	0	1	274	63	211	6	0	0	28
Dallas Rugby D2	5	4	0	1	310	35	275	4	0	0	22
Austin Huns D2	5	2	2	1	172	88	84	4	0	0	14
Houston Athletic D2	6	1	4	1	61	273	-212	2	0	0	8
Dallas Harlequins D2	6	0	6	0	12	370	-358	0	0	1	-1

North
Team	GP	W	L	T	PF	PA	PD	BT	BL	FF	PTS
Little Rock Stormers	8	7	1	0	378	62	316	8	1	0	37
Tulsa Rugby	8	7	1	0	256	175	81	6	0	0	34
Dallas Athletic	8	5	3	0	180	201	-21	4	1	0	25
Euless Texans	7	3	4	0	188	177	11	3	0	1	14
Oklahoma City Crusaders	8	0	8	0	152	337	-185	3	3	0	6
Fort Worth Rugby	7	1	6	0	78	280	-202	1	0	0	5

South
Team	GP	W	L	T	PF	PA	PD	BT	BL	FF	PTS
Houston United	6	6	0	0	358	89	269	6	0	0	30
Katy Lions	6	4	2	0	168	199	-31	3	0	0	19
San Antonio Rugby	5	2	3	0	179	135	44	4	1	0	13
The Woodlands Rugby	5	2	3	0	88	120	-32	1	1	0	10
Alamo City Rugby	6	0	6	0	83	333	-250	1	1	0	2

=== Division 3 ===
- Abilene Rugby
- Alliance Rugby
- Austin Blacks D3
- Austin Huns D3
- Bay Area Rugby
- Corpus Christi Crabs
- Corpus Christi Dogfish
- Dallas Diablos
- Dallas Rugby D3
- Denton Rugby
- Fort Hood Phantoms
- Galveston Rugby
- Grand Prairie Mavericks
- Houston Arrows
- Houston United D3
- Kingwood Crusaders
- Lone Star Rugby
- McAllen Knights
- San Antonio Rugby D3
- San Marcos Greys
- Shreveport Rugby

2016-2017 Standings

Central
Team	GP	W	L	T	PF	PA	PD	BT	BL	FF	PTS
San Marcos Greys	7	5	2	0	347	91	256	6	1	0	27
Austin Blacks D3	5	5	0	0	308	34	274	5	0	0	25
McAllen Knights	7	5	2	0	239	158	81	5	0	0	25
Fort Hood Phantoms	7	4	3	0	289	119	170	3	0	0	19
Corpus Christi Crabs	8	3	5	0	215	319	-104	4	0	0	16
San Antonio Rugby D3	8	3	5	0	156	393	-237	3	0	0	15
Austin Huns D3	7	3	4	0	140	175	-35	2	0	0	14
Corpus Christi Dogfish	7	0	7	0	62	467	-405	1	0	1	0

North
Team	GP	W	L	T	PF	PA	PD	BT	BL	FF	PTS
Shreveport Rugby	7	6	1	0	364	43	321	6	1	0	31
Dallas Rugby D3	6	5	1	0	386	40	346	5	0	0	25
Grand Prairie Mavericks	7	4	3	0	283	117	166	4	0	0	20
Alliance Rugby	6	3	4	0	188	107	81	3	0	1	18
Abilene Rugby	8	2	6	0	195	415	-220	2	0	0	10
Dallas Diablos	5	1	4	0	31	454	-423	1	0	0	5
Denton Rugby	6	0	6	0	32	324	-292	1	1	0	2

South
Team	GP	W	L	T	PF	PA	PD	BT	BL	FF	PTS
Houston United D3	8	7	0	1	496	110	386	7	0	0	37
Lone Star Rugby	8	7	0	1	484	107	377	7	0	0	37
Bay Area Rugby	9	5	4	0	288	388	-100	5	0	0	25
Kingwood Crusaders	8	2	6	0	188	427	-239	4	1	0	13
Galveston Rugby	7	2	5	0	161	371	-210	3	0	0	11
Houston Arrows	8	0	8	0	93	307	-214	1	2	0	3

=== College Men ===
- Red River Conference D1
- Southwest Conference D2

== Women's Clubs ==
=== Division 1 ===
- Austin Valkyries
- Dallas Harlequins
- Houston Athletic
- Little Rock Stormers

2016-2017 Standings
Team	GP	W	L	T	PF	PA	PD	BT	BL	FF	PTS
Austin Valkyries	4	4	0	0	219	5	214	4	0	0	20
Houston Athletic	5	3	2	0	151	87	64	2	1	0	15
Dallas Harlequins	3	1	2	0	17	180	-163	0	0	0	4
Little Rock Stormers	4	0	4	0	22	137	-115	0	1	0	1

=== Division 2 ===
- Austin Valkyries D2
- Dallas Athletic
- Griffins Rugby
- Oklahoma Roses
- San Antonio Rugby
- Tulsa Rugby

2016-2017 Standings

North
Team	GP	W	L	T	PF	PA	PD	BT	BL	FF	PTS
Tulsa Rugby	5	4	1	0	286	82	204	4	0	0	20
Oklahoma Roses	4	2	2	0	148	158	-10	2	0	0	10
Griffins Rugby	4	2	2	0	112	185	-73	2	0	0	10

South
Team	GP	W	L	T	PF	PA	PD	BT	BL	FF	PTS
Austin Valkyries D2	4	4	0	0	129	38	91	3	0	0	19
San Antonio Rugby	3	1	2	0	47	55	-8	0	0	0	4
Dallas Athletic	4	0	4	0	44	206	-162	1	1	0	2

=== College Women ===
- Southwest Women's Conference

== See also ==
- Rugby union in the United States
