= Vista High School =

Vista High School may refer to:

== United States ==
- Vista High School (Lynwood, California), in Los Angeles County
- Vista High School (Vista, California), in San Diego County
- Vista High School (Arizona), in Yuma, Arizona

== Others ==
- Vista High School (Cape Town), in South Africa

== See also ==
- Vistas High School Program, in Harris County, Texas
