= Cannons Creek Independent School =

Independent school in Cape Town, South Africa

Location
- Nursery Way; Pinelands; Cape Town 7405; South Africa; 33°56′24″S 18°30′24″E

Information
- Type: Co-educational independent school
- Established: 1997
- Principals: Mrs. T. Wahl(Primary School) and Mr. A. Morton (High School)
- Grades: RR–12
- Enrollment: 420
- School fees: R 98 208 (High) / R 79 145 (Primary) / R70 125 (Pre-Primary)
- Website: www.cannonscreek.co.za

Cannons Creek Independent School, situated in Pinelands, Cape Town, South Africa, was founded in January 1997 by Mrs Carol Barhouch (now Booth) together with four teachers, Mrs Hazelmay Duncan, Mr Kevin Wroth, Ms Nicola du Plooy and Ms Lesley Jacobson, as a primary co-educational English-speaking Christian school. The school currently incorporates a primary school (Grades RR to 6) and a high school (Grades 7 to 12, writing WCED Matric exams).

== History ==
When Cannons Creek started in January 1997, there were only 37 pupils and 5 teachers. The school was then housed in the Pinelands Club Hall.

However, with the continued demand for places, it was soon realised that the school would need a building of its own. The initial concept was to only provide a primary school; however, in 1998 there was a demand from the parents for Cannons Creek to establish a high school. In 1999, two years following the opening of the Cannons Creek Primary School, a high school was opened, with Mr Mike van Haght as the principal. That same year, Cannons Creek took occupation of the land and a building was built for the school. Due to the increasing number of pupils, the high school building was built and opened in February 2003.

Cannons Creek Primary and High Schools were housed in two buildings located alongside each other in Nursery Way, Pinelands with an adjacent sports field. In 2006, a Grade R class was started with Mrs Christine Underwood as teacher.

In February 2012 a new primary school building of 16 classrooms was opened, and the former primary school building was taken over by the high school.

In 2016, on the school's Founders' Day, a new Cultural Centre was inaugurated next to the high school's Lonsdale Building. The Cultural Centre has three sound-proofed music teaching venues, and a gallery. It is used for both primary and high school assemblies and for cultural events.

In October 2017 The Carol Booth Centre housing the primary school art classroom, computer laboratory and primary school library was opened. It is named after the founder principal, Mrs Booth, who retired as head at the end of 2017.

The school endeavours to keep classes to a maximum of 16 pupils per primary school class and 20 per high school class. In 2011 double streaming of classes was started in both the high and primary school, with the exception of the Grade RR class which double-streamed in 2019.

Cannons Creek became the first school in South Africa to have its own radio station which went live during 2019.

Principal of High School:

- Mr Mike van Haght, 1999–2022
- Mr Angus Morton, 2023-

Principal of Primary School:

- Mrs Carol Booth (née Barhouch), 1997–2017
- Mrs Tracy Wahl, 2018–

== Academics ==
Cannons Creek has an exceptional academic record. Since the inception of Grade 12 in 2003, the school has maintained a 100% Grade 12 pass rate.

Grade 12 WCED results	2006	2007	2008	2009	2010	2011	2012	2013	2014	2015
Pass Rate (%)	100	100	100	100	100	100	100	100	100	100
Class aggregate (%)	59	71	74	66	66	69	71	73	72	71
Top aggregate (%)	94.9	90.5	84.7	85.9	87.0	85.3	79.4	86.0	88.4	86.4

Grade 12 WCED results	2016	2017	2018	2019	2020	2021	2022	2023	2024	2025
Pass Rate (%)	100	100	100	100	100	100	100	100	100	100
Class aggregate (%)	72	74	71	75	75.3	74.1	73.3	76	75	77.2
Top aggregate (%)	88.9	92.3	88.9	88.8	87.6	88.6	89.7	96.3	92.0	95.2

In 2014 Cannons Creek was given the WCED Award of Excellence and was again awarded a certificate of excellence in 2017, for being placed 14th in the Western Cape. In 2018 Cannons Creek again received the Premier's Award for placing third in the Western Province for smaller schools.

In 2016 Cannons received a special award from the University of Pretoria for being in the top 30 achieving schools for mathematics in the country.

Based on the Matric Class of 2020's results, Cannons Creek was announced as the 'Top Small School in the Western Cape' (less than 30 candidates). The school was awarded 18th place in the province for the 2021 NSC exams. Cannons Creek Independent High School was awarded SECOND Top Small School (enrolment of less than 80 candidates) in the WC for the 2022 NSC exams. Cannons Creek Independent High School was awarded FIRST Top Small School (enrolment of less than 80 candidates) in the WC for the 2023 NSC exams. The school's top candidate (scoring 96,3% average), Thomas Kabalin, also achieved an award for being in the Top 40 candidates in the province.

=== Compulsory subjects for Grades 7, 8 and 9 ===
- English (Home Language)
- Afrikaans (First Additional Language)
- Mathematics
- Natural Sciences (Physical Sciences and Life Sciences)
- Social Sciences (Geography and History)
- Economic Management Sciences
- Creative Arts (Art, Drama, and Music)
- Life Orientation (Guidance and Physical Education)
- Computer Skills
- Conversational isiXhosa (Grade 7 and 8)
- STEAM (an amalgamation of Sciences, Technology, Engineering, Arts, and Mathematics)

=== Subject choices for Grades 10, 11 and 12 ===
From Grade 10, pupils are required to make their subject choices which they will carry forward to their final Grade 12 (matric) exams. The final subject choice is made during the pupil's Grade 9 year. The available subjects are grouped into categories, and students must choose at least seven subjects in total.

==== Core Subjects ====
- English (Home Language)
- Afrikaans (First Additional Language or Second Additional Language for immigrants only)
- Life Orientation
- Mathematics or Mathematical Literacy

==== Subject Groups ====
One subject may be chosen from each group.

Group 1

- Physical Sciences (Chemistry and Physics)
- History
- Tourism

Group 2

- Life Sciences
- Computer Applications Technology
- Design

Group 3

- Accounting
- Geography
- Dramatic Arts
- Music

==== Subjects Offered Off-Campus ====
- Visual Arts (at Peter Clarke Art Centre)
- Information Technology (at Rustenburg Girls' High)
- Further Studies Mathematics (at Claremont High School)

== Sports and extramural activities ==
=== Primary School ===
==== Extracurriculars ====
- Orff Ensemble
- Art Club
- Coding Club
- Marimbas
- Drama Club
- Kingdom Kids
- Debating
- ChatterBox
- Impact Christian Union
- Choir
- Nifty Needlework
- Young Strings
- Sports Hub
- Individual Music Tuition
- Outreach Club
- Fine Motor Fun
- Steam Ahead
- Tennis
- Chess Club

==== Sport ====
Cannons Creek offers a variety of sports for both boys and girls, with seasonal offerings that include:

- Summer Sports:
  - Boys: Cricket
  - Girls: Softball
  - Optional: Girls may also participate in Cricket instead of Softball, should they choose to.
- Winter Sports:
  - Boys: Hockey, Squash
  - Girls: Hockey, Netball

Over the years the school has had many of its sports players be Western Province sport players, with some even representing South Africa, such as in the U13 hockey team, U13 softball team, U13 tennis team, indoor hockey, cross country trails, karate and kickboxing.

=== High School ===
==== Clubs and Societies ====
- Instrumental Ensemble (Grade 7-12)
- Rock Band (Grade 7-12)
- Marimbas (Grade 7-11)
- Vocal Ensemble
- Tech Team
- The Sophists (Debating)
- Interact
- Muslim Student Association
- Canoeing
- Photographic Society
- Go.COM (Christian Union)
- Outdoor Club
- Book Club
- Back to the Future (History Society)
- Table Tennis

==== Sport ====
- Softball
- Cricket
- Squash
- Netball
- Running Club
- Indoor Hockey
- Outdoor Hockey

Sport is compulsory at Cannons Creek. The history of the high school's sport scene is filled with well-qualified sport players, with people from hockey, equestrian club, cross country, ladies' golf, body boarding and ice hockey reaching the Western Province trials level. Farouk Mayman, a past pupil of Cannons Creek, represented South Africa for Water polo at the Tokyo Olympics in 2021. The school also had a South African touch rugby player who graduated in 2006.

==== Adventure Week ====
Adventure Week is a week in which all the students and teachers in the high school from Grade 7 to 12 complete a hiking trail or attend a camp. The camp is usually five days (in Grade 9 it is a ten-day event) and is always held in the final week of the first term. Each grade has their own set of hiking trails or places that they go. The aim of Adventure Week (a compulsory event) is for the students to experience nature, be out of their comfort zones, learn life skills, and, most importantly, bond with their schoolmates.

In Grade 12, the students have the opportunity of travelling to Namibia and canoeing on the Orange River.
