= David Eadie =

South African cricketer (1975–2011)

Personal information
- Full name: David John Eadie
- Born: 2 January 1975; Cape Town, Cape Province, South Africa
- Died: 7 May 2011 (aged 36); Mouille Point, Western Cape, South Africa
- Batting: Right-handed
- Bowling: Right-arm medium

Domestic team information
- Years: Team
- 1998–1999: Oxford University

Career statistics
Competition	First-class
Matches	10
Runs scored	192
Batting average	19.20
100s/50s	–/2
Top score	68*
Balls bowled	1,013
Wickets	16
Bowling average	37.62
5 wickets in innings	–
10 wickets in match	–
Best bowling	3/57
Catches/stumpings	3/–
- Source: Cricinfo, 1 March 2020

David John Eadie (2 January 1975 – 7 May 2011) was a South African first-class cricketer.

Eadie was born at Cape Town in January 1975. He was educated at the Diocesan College, before going up to St Edmund Hall, Oxford as a Rhodes Scholar in 1996. While studying at Oxford, Eadie played first-class cricket for Oxford University in 1998 and 1999, making a total of ten appearances. These included eight matches against county opposition and two against Cambridge University in The University Match. Eadie scored a total of 192 runs in his ten matches, at an average of 19.20 and a high score of 68 not out, which was one of two half centuries he made. With his right-arm medium pace, he took 16 wickets at a bowling average of 37.62, with best figures of 3 for 57. Eadie also played field hockey for Oxford.

After graduating from Oxford, Eadie returned to South Africa. He died at Mouille Point in Cape Town on 7 May 2011, after falling into a state of delirium while on a night out and jumping over railings into the sea, hitting his head on the rocks below.
