= Austin Huns =

US rugby union club, based in Austin, TX

United States
- Full name: Austin Huns Rugby Football Club
- Unions: (United States) USA Rugby (United States) Texas Geographical Union
- Founded: 1972; 54 years ago
- Location: Austin, Texas
- Ground(s): Huns Rugby Ranch; Austin, Texas
- President: (United States) Matt Mitchell
- Director of Rugby: (United States) Austin Willis
- Coach(es): (Australia) / (United States) Lachlan Ferguson (South Africa) / (United States) Zinzan Elan-Puttick (Republic of Ireland) / (Canada) Des Alvey (Canada) Andrew Hay (United States) Brent "Zippy" Zipoy (United States) Luis "Wheezy" Sanchez (United States) Clifton Stokes (United States) Terrell Modkins
- Captain: (United States) Phil Hanson
- League: Texas Rugby Union
- 2023-2024: TRU Men's Division 1 TRU Men's Division 2 TRU Men's Division 3
Team kit

Official website
- www.hunsrugby.com

The Austin Huns Rugby Football Club is an American men's rugby union club based in Austin, Texas. In June 2017 they became U.S. Division 1 National Champions beating New York Athletic Club RFC 27–23 in the final match.

== History ==
The Austin Huns were formed in 1972 by Patton "Pat" Lochridge as he didn't believe he and some of his teammates were getting a fair shake as to playing time from the Austin Rugby Club that they had been playing for previously. The Austin Huns Rugby Club has competed in all 3 National USA Rugby 15s divisions and the National 7s division.

In 1993, the Huns competed in the Division II National Championships hosted in Mobile, Alabama. They lost in the semi-final to Santa Rosa Rugby Club 18–15 with Santa Rosa subsequently winning the final. In 1994, the Huns hosted the Division II National Championships in Austin, Texas (won again by Santa Rosa RFC) and in 1995, they hosted both the Division I & II National Championships in Austin, Texas. The Huns have historically been a playoff-caliber team in whatever division they competed in, both before and after this 1993 appearance at D II Nationals.

In 2016, the Huns announced they would start moving towards professionalism, a relatively new concept in the US. The Austin Huns were one of the teams of the Major Rugby Championship, a one-off friendly series of games in the spring of 2017. The friendly games included the Austin Huns, the Glendale Raptors, Rugby Utah, the Dallas Griffins, and New Orleans RFC.

In June 2017, the Huns Rugby Football Club beat New York Athletic Club in the U.S. Division 1 final to become National Champions. The Huns were the first Austin team to win the DI National Championship and the second Texas team after the Dallas Harlequins.

In August 2017, the Austin Huns Rugby Club announced they would not be joining the inaugural season of Major League Rugby (MLR). The Huns parted ways with the organization managing the bid for an MLR team in Austin which was subsequently re-branded as Elite Rugby Management and formed the Austin Elite Rugby team.

The Austin Huns 1st, 2nd, and 3rd teams play in Division I, Division II, and Division III, respectively, within USA Rugby's club system in the Red River Conference.

In 2019/2020 the Huns had one of their most successful overall club seasons in its history: the D1 side finished the season 7–2 overall, beat the Dallas Reds three times and finished second in the league table; the D2 side finished 7–6 and finished in the middle of the D2 table, and the D3 side finished 7-3 and placed second in the league table. In addition to finishing 21–11 overall in Men's competition, the Huns Youth Rugby Program also fielded 170 youth participants for the spring season. The total number of Huns in action for 2019/2020 was greater than 260 participants, making the Huns one of the largest and most successful clubs in the USA. The 15s playoffs and Summer 7s were canceled in 2020 due to the COVID-19 pandemic.

In August 2019, the Austin Huns RFC welcomed its second class of inductees into the Huns Hall of Fame. Bill Overton, Luke Ashley, John Burns, Gerry Acuna, Jay Rudd, Jack Bloom, Kirk Tate, Carl Dahlberg, Dave Zack, Graham Watson, Shawn Rutledge, Luis Sanchez, and Chris Bugge.

These thirteen men joined Pat Lochridge in the Huns Hall of Fame.

In 2021, the Huns won the TOLA (Texas, Oklahoma, Louisiana) 7s Rugby Championship for the third season in a row. This three-peat launched the Huns into the National Championship Tournament as one of only four play-in teams. The Huns finished 5th as Plate Champions, with victories over national 7s powerhouses Western Athletic Club, Oceanside, NY Old Blue, and Life West and with losses only to the eventual finalists the Chicago Lions and the Westside Ronins. Coached by Adam Scheidler, Brian Welborn, Ryan Kretchmar, and Alex Rees; the player roster for the club was Corey Jones (captain), Brendon Curle, Jack Casey, Patrick Coleman, Austin Willis, Ricky Chestnutwood, Brandon Johnson, Case Fleck, Karch Hoffman, Shamall Schoonmaker, Spencer McManes, Zane Jackson, and Josh Williams.

== Past notable players ==
- (United States) Todd Clever - Former captain and record holder of most caps for USA Eagles. Clever played his first game with the team during the playoffs in 2017.
- (United States) Hanco Germishuys - Capped Eagle, former captain of Junior All-Americans
- (United States) Pat Lochridge - Founder of Huns RFC. Inaugural inductee to the Huns Hall of Fame in 2017.
- (United States) Peter Malcolm - Collegiate All-American from Wheeling Jesuit University. Capped USA Eagle.
- (South Africa) Dallen Stanford - Current USA Rugby commentator, Capped 7s Eagle

== Huns Hall of Fame Members ==
2017 Class - Pat Lochridge

2019 Class - Bill Overton, Luke Ashley, John Burns, Gerry Acuña, Jay Rudd, Jack Bloom, Kirk Tate, Chris Bugge, Carl Dahlberg, Dave Zack, Graham Watson, Shawn Rutledge, and Luis Sanchez.
