= Huis der Nederlanden =

Social institute in South Africa

Het Huis der Nederlanden (English: The Dutch Building) is a social institute in Pinelands, South Africa which provides a library and social meetings for the Dutch population of the town. It also contains two conference rooms where general meetings by Dutch people, as well as foreigners, are held. It is now known as the South African Centre for the Netherlands and Flanders.
