= Chris Pope (rugby union) =

South African rugby union footballer

- Born: Christopher Francis Pope; 30 September 1952 (age 74) Stellenbosch, Western Cape
- Height: 1.85 m (6 ft 1 in)
- Weight: 91 kg (201 lb)
- School: Rondebosch Boys' High School
- University: University of Cape Town

Rugby union career
Provincial / State sides
Years	Team	Apps	(Points)
1972–1976	Western Province		
International career
Years	Team	Apps	(Points)
1974–1976	South Africa	9	(4)

Christopher Francis Pope (born 30 September 1952) is a former South African rugby union player.

== Playing career ==
Pope matriculated at Rondebosch Boys' High School in Cape Town and attended the University of Cape Town for a medical degree. He made his provincial debut for Western Province in 1972 against Northern Transvaal at Loftus Versfeld. In 1976, Pope scored the winning try for Western Province during their 12–11 victory over the touring All Blacks.

Pope made his test debut for the Springboks against the 1974 British Lions at Newlands in Cape Town and was the only backline player to play in all four tests during the series against the Lions. At the end of 1974 Pope toured with the Springboks to France without playing in any tests and then played in five more tests, two against France and three against the All Blacks. He also played in four tour matches for the Springboks.

=== Test history ===
No.	Opponents	Results (RSA 1st)	Position	Tries	Dates	Venue
1.	British Lions	3–12	Wing		8 June 1974	Newlands, Cape Town
2.	(British & Irish Lions) British Lions	9–28	Wing		22 June 1974	Loftus Versfeld, Pretoria
3.	(British & Irish Lions) British Lions	9–26	Wing		13 July 1974	Boet Erasmus Stadium, Port Elizabeth
4.	(British & Irish Lions) British Lions	13–13	Wing		27 July 1974	Ellis Park, Johannesburg
5.	France	38–25	Wing	1	21 June 1975	Free State Stadium, Bloemfontein
6.	France	33–18	Wing		28 June 1975	Loftus Versfeld, Pretoria
7.	New Zealand	9–15	Wing		14 August 1976	Free State Stadium, Bloemfontein
8.	New Zealand	15–10	Wing		4 September 1976	Newlands, Cape Town
9.	New Zealand	15–14	Wing		18 September 1976	Ellis Park, Johannesburg

== See also ==
- List of South Africa national rugby union players – Springbok no. 461
