= Eerste River, Western Cape =

Suburb in Western Cape, South Africa

Eerste River
- Location within Western Cape Location within South Africa
- Coordinates: 34°0′S 18°43′E
- Country: South Africa
- Province: Western Cape
- Municipality: City of Cape Town

Area
  - Total: 5.86 km^{2} (2.26 sq mi)

Population (2011)
  - Total: 39,237
  - Density: 6,700/km^{2} (17,300/sq mi)

Racial makeup (2011)
  - Coloured: 81.7%
  - Black African: 16.0%
  - Indian/Asian: 0.5%
  - White: 0.2%
  - Other: 1.5%

First languages (2011)
  - Afrikaans: 73.9%
  - English: 12.9%
  - Xhosa: 8.9%
  - Other: 4.3%
- Time zone: UTC+2 (SAST)
- Postal code (street): 7100
- PO box: 7100
- Website: http://eersteriver.co.za/

Eerste River (Eersterivier in Afrikaans, meaning "first river") is a town in the Western Cape, South Africa and a suburb of the City of Cape Town. It forms part of the Eastern Suburbs zone of the city situated behind the Stellenbosch/Vlaeberg Hills on the eastern outskirts of the metropolitan area.

It lies on the R102 (Van Riebeek Road) about 40 km from Cape Town and 8 km from Cape Town International Airport on the N2 route.

Eerste River started off as many different farms and expanded vastly after the 1980s. It is a diverse town; many of its almost 40,000 residents originally immigrated here from elsewhere. Among its beauty is the area called Penhill, hidden from the town and filled with nature.

Schools in Eerste River include the Afrikaans-medium Eersterivier Secondary School. Other schools in the area include R R Franks Primary (formerly Methodist Primary), Forest Heights Primary School, Forest Village Leadership Academy, Palm Park Primary School, Stratford Primary School, Spurwing Primary School, Apex Primary School, Tuscany Glen Primary School, Melton Primary School, Helderkruin Primary School, Apex High School,Tuscany High School, Forest Heights High School, and in the surrounding areas Kleinvlei High School and Malibu High School.

Population statistics indicate that the suburb has close to 40,000 residents, but other estimates are closer to 52,000 when Kleinvlei, Palm Park and Penhill are included to the municipality - which are all still considered suburbs of Eerste River by locals and many visitors alike.

Delft, Blackheath, Wesbank and Brentwood Park used to be a part of the town, but as the towns grew, all were given their own municipalities.
