= LEAP Science and Maths Schools =

South African school system

- Founded: 1987
- Founder: John Gilmour
- Type: Nonprofit organisation
- Purpose: Eliminate Educational Inequity
- Location: South Africa
- Method: Full time senior schooling with extended hours
- Owner: PBO
- Key people: John Gilmour – Founder - now Board member Joe Kainja – Board chairman Ray Bontle – Member of the Board; Thandi Moyo – Member of the Board – Lee SwanMember of the Board – Member of the Board; Heidi Raubenheimer – Member of the Board – Member of the Board; Solomon Madikane – Member of the Board – Member of the Board Dr Mamphela Ramphele - Patron
- Revenue: Parent contributions; State subsidy; Corporate Social Investment; Foundations and Trusts
- Employees: 160
- Website: leapschool.org.za

LEAP Science and Mathematics Schools or LEAP Schools is a collection of eight low-fee secondary education schools in four provinces in South Africa. The first LEAP school opened in 2004 in rented premises in Observatory, Cape Town and mainly served the township of Langa. LEAP is an independent school mainly funded by small parent contributions, South African Corporates with limited subsidies from the Department of Basic Education.

== History ==
=== Langa Education Assistance Program (or LEAP) ===
John Gilmour was a teacher at Pinelands High School in Cape Town in 1987 when he decided to respond to a call from the South African business community, to contribute to the redress of the devastation of the Bantu Education Act, a segregation law imposed in the education sector by the Apartheid system in 1953.

“Africa Week" was then introduced by a team led by John Gilmour to bring black learners under the "Bantu Education" system to spend a week at Pinelands High School, which was then a whites-only school. The program became the precursor for the Langa Education Assistance Program (or LEAP) which aimed at providing one hundred black students from the Langa township with support tuition from Pinelands High teachers in English, Mathematics, and Science three afternoons a week.

The prohibitive transport cost of bringing learners from the township schools to Pinelands High School forced the model to be revised. In 1996, it was then decided that instead of learners being bussed in to Pinelands High, teachers will be transported to meet learners in township schools.

When John Gilmour realised that there was no increase in the proportion of black learners entering university, especially science-based disciplines, he sought for an alternative model. LEAP Science and Maths school was the alternative model.

=== LEAP Science and Maths School ===
LEAP Science and Maths school aims to increase the number of black learners who take science and maths-based modules at high school to increase the chance of being accepted at university, particularly in disciplines where these modules are a prerequisite.

Gilmour resigned as headmaster of Abbot's College in 2002, where he had been since he left Pinelands in 1997, to focus on LEAP Science and Maths School. In January 2004, the first LEAP Science and Maths School opened in Observatory, Cape Town, with seventy-two learners, seven teachers, and one administrative staff member. The school has replicated in 8 sites across South Africa.

=== Expansion of the LEAP model ===
==== LEAP 1 ====
The LEAP Science and Maths School, which started in Observatory, later moved to Pinelands and became known as LEAP 1. It is now located in Langa itself, in the St Francis Centre. It serves Langa Township. It is the first and oldest LEAP Science and Maths school. The school is headed by its operation leader, Patricia Mudiayi.

==== LEAP 2 ====
LEAP 2 opened in 2007 in Pinelands. It is now located in Crossroads. It serves learners from Gugulethu, Delft, Philippi, and Crossroads townships. In 2013, the school opened satellite classes to serve grade 9 and 10 learners from the township of Delft. School learners are taught in English and isiXhosa. The head of the school is Nomveliso Qaqa, an alumnus of LEAP, who also assumes the role of operations leader.

==== LEAP 3 ====
The school opened in 2008 to serve learners from the township of Alexandra in Johannesburg. It is situated in Linbro Park. Learners are taught in English, isiZulu, Sepedi, and Sesotho under the operations leader. In 2019 LEAP 3 received its first 100% matric pass rate after being stuck on 96% for a number of years. It followed further with its 100% pass rate in 2021, 2022 and 2023. The current school leader is Asanda Sigigaba who was also a LEAP learner when the organisation opened its first school in Cape Town in 2004.

==== LEAP 4 ====
This school is situated in the township of Diepsloot, just outside Johannesburg. The school opened in 2011 through a partnership with the South Africa corporate Aveng Group. LEAP 4 teaches learners in isiZulu and Sepedi as home languages, along with English. The school is led by Neo motsope

==== LEAP 5 ====
In 2012, LEAP 5 opened its doors in Jane Furse, Sekhukhune in Limpopo province. The school is led by Raphael Mukachi.

==== LEAP 6 ====
LEAP 6 is situated in Ga-Rankuwa near Pretoria. The school opened in 2012 at the request of the Anglican Diocese of Pretoria, which was concerned with the community's poor educational results and high unemployment rate among young people. It is led by its operations leader, Wilhemina Motileng.

==== LEAP 7 ====
LEAP 7 is situated in Paarl in the Western Cape. The school opened at the start of 2024, serving the community of Mbekweni and surrounding areas. A local Family Foundation funds the school, led by Alinane Phiri. In 2024, the school began with 90 students in grades 8 and 9.

==== LEAP 8 ====
LEAP 8 is situated in Kuruman in the Northern Cape. It opened in 2024 and is funded by the Assore mines through 5he Boleng Trust. The school works from the Kuruman Moffat Mission Station site. The leader is Nosipho Qongo, an alumnus of LEAP. In 2024, the school began with 90 students in grades 8 and 9.

== Focus ==
LEAP schools focus on maths and science and emphasise the emotional development of learners. John Gilmour acknowledged the importance of the emotional development in a country where "eight million children come from single-parent households and a further 4.3 million reside with neither biological parent".

== Partnerships ==
LEAP's model is based on engagement with the broader community and building partnerships and collaboration with other organisations, particularly schools. It is a three-way collaboration approach where each LEAP school partners with a more privileged school as well as a less privileged school (a township school) in the community where it operates to promote a culture of shared resources and cultural exchange.

LEAP is "Teach with Africa's" partner on the continent and together they have established the Teacher Institute which seeks to develop teachers and supports individuals wanting to enter the teaching profession
