= Ronald Napier =

South African cricketer (1935–2025)

Personal information
- Full name: Ronald Stuart Napier
- Born: 23 October 1935; Cape Town, Cape Province, South Africa
- Died: 11 June 2025 (aged 89)
- Batting: Right-handed
- Bowling: Leg break

Domestic team information
- Years: Team
- 1956: Oxford University

Career statistics
Competition	First-class
Matches	1
Runs scored	0
Batting average	0.00
100s/50s	–/–
Top score	0
Balls bowled	12
Wickets	0
Bowling average	–
5 wickets in innings	–
10 wickets in match	–
Best bowling	–
Catches/stumpings	1/–
- Source: Cricinfo, 28 March 2020

Ronald Stuart Napier (23 October 1935 – 11 June 2025) was a South African first-class cricketer and lawyer.

Born at Cape Town on 23 October 1935 to Ronald and Karin (nee Lindstrom), Napier's father was killed on active duty in North Africa in March 1944. Napier was educated at Diocesan College in Cape Town and Eton College in England, before going up to Trinity College, Oxford to study law.

While studying at Oxford, he made a single appearance in first-class cricket for Oxford University against Sussex at Oxford in 1956.

Returning to South Africa after graduating, Napier held the positions of chairman of The Fire Protection Association and has served on the board of Business Against Crime, in addition to being a company director.

Napier died in Johannesburg, South Africa on 11 June 2025, aged 89.
