= Rondebosch Boys' High School =

Public school in Cape Town, South Africa

Coordinates: 33°58′5″S 18°28′35″E

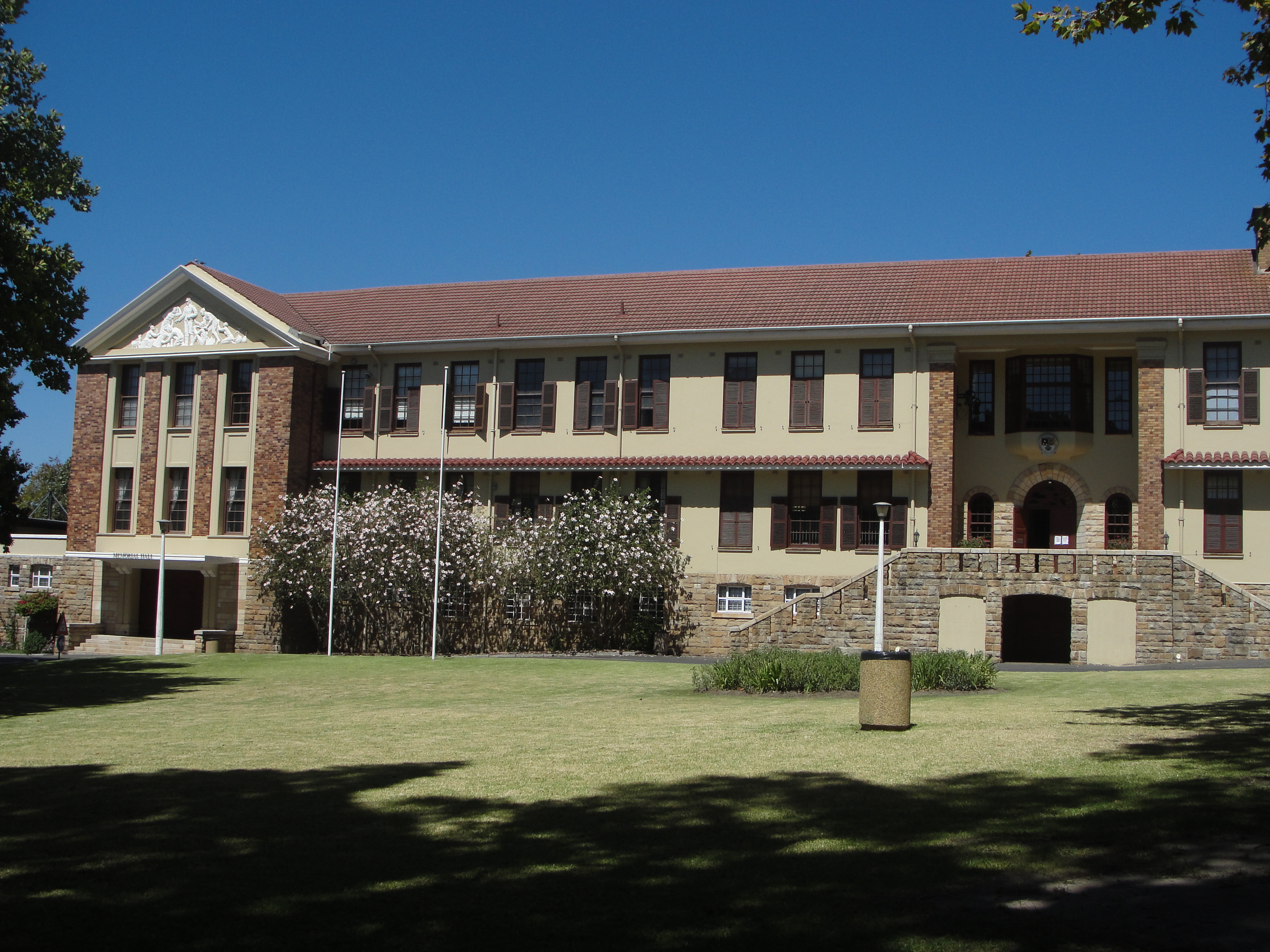
- Rondebosch Boys' High School

Location
- Canigou Avenue, Rondebosch; Cape Town, Western Cape; South Africa

Information
- Type: All-boys public school
- Motto: Altius et Latius (Higher and Wider)
- Established: 2 February 1897; 129 years ago
- Sister school: Rustenburg Girls’ High School
- School district: District Metro Central, Circuit 10
- Headmaster: Shaun Simpson
- Grades: 8–12
- Gender: Male
- Age: 14 to 18
- Language: English
- Schedule: 08:00 - 15:00
- Campus: Urban Campus
- Houses: Andrews; Canigou; Fletcher; Marchand; Ramage
- Colours: Blue; Gold; White
- Nickname: Bosch
- Rivals: Bishops Diocesan College; South African College Schools; Wynberg Boys' High School
- Accreditation: Western Cape Education Department
- School fees: R81 600-00 (tuition); R69 500-00 (boarding)
- Feeder schools: Rondebosch Boys' Preparatory School
- Website: www.rondebosch.com

Rondebosch Boys' High School is a public English medium high school for boys situated in the suburb of Rondebosch in Cape Town in the Western Cape province of South Africa. It is one of the oldest schools in the country, having been established in 1897. Rondebosch is the only school in the Western Cape to have a Nobel Prize laureate, Allan M. Cormack in Physiology and Medicine.

== History ==
=== Establishment ===
In the late 1800s, the residents of Rondebosch got together to consider the need for a boys' school in the near future. The idea of an English-medium school was chosen and the Dutch Reformed Church representative of the district, Reverend Bernard PJ Marchand, took the lead of this initiative. Marchand obtained the help of several prominent dignitaries and businessmen, including William Philip Schreiner, an old boy of SACS and future Prime Minister of the Cape Colony and Sir Lewis Mitchell, the manager of the Standard Bank, to guarantee the initial funding that would be required. In 1897, Dr Thomas Muir, Superintendent-General of Education, approved a grant of £50 to cover the salary, and housing, allowance for the principal of this new boys' public school, the man chosen for the promising job was 38-year-old Robert MacLennan Ramage, a graduate of Edinburgh University. Ramage was an experienced teacher, gaining his experience by teaching at the flourishing new schools of the Colony, having been a teacher at the Stellenbosch (Paul Roos) Gymnasium.

On 2 February 1897 the school opened as the Rondebosch High School for Junior Boys in Glena Hall, a Dutch Reformed Church building in Erin Road. The school started modestly, with the number of pupils enrolled just 8, the maximum it could accommodate at the time. By the end of April, the number of boys on the roll had increased to 28, with the school teaching boys from standards 2 to 7. The first inspection report to Dr. Muir was a positive one, saying: 'This school has made a promising commencement and deserves the unhesitating support of the neighbourhood. The accommodation and equipment are both satisfactory. The teachers are able and zealous.'

By August of the same year, the school in the little church hall was attracting a lot of interest, and its name had been changed to the Boys' High School, Rondebosch. With the large number of applications the school was receiving from the local residents, the school committee was forced to become more selective in acceptances. Before the end of the year, the committee was looking for a site to construct a new, considerably bigger school. Soon after their search began, a nearby property - The Firs, a site with an area of almost one acre of ground, at the corner of Campground and Rouwkoop roads came up for sale. The committee negotiated a loan with the Standard Bank and bought the property for an amount of £1 900. The architect commissioned to design the new school was G G Milne. Teaching in the new school commenced on 7 September 1898. In 1947 the High School on Campground Road moved to its current location on Canigou Ave. The buildings at this location, including the Canigou boarding house, were designed by architect Kilgour Parker, who was an Old Boy of the school, and well known Cape Town architect. His firm also were the architects for Wynberg Girls' High School and Rustenburg Girls' High School, as well as several other schools in the Western Cape.

=== School Song ===
Rondebosch's school song was written and published in 1914. The words were written by Cocky Wilson and the music was composed by Mrs Elsie Skaife.

=== Boarding ===
Boarding at Rondebosch Boys' was established in 1904 to accommodate boys from the farming areas of the Western Cape. The tradition of boarding at Rondebosch continues to this day, as a large number of the boys who board at Rondebosch come from rural areas. The boarding houses at Rondebosch currently accommodate 170 boys, with the Grade 8 and 9 boys being accommodated in Mason House and the Grade 10-12 boys in Canigou.

=== Buildings ===
==== Memorial Hall ====
The Rondebosch Boys' High School Memorial Hall was built to honour the Rondebosch Old Boys who died in World War I and World War II. The hall was built after WWII and was expanded in 2017 with the addition of a second gallery to increase the accommodation from 740 to 900 people.

== Old Boys' Union ==
The Rondebosch Old Boys' Union was established in 1909 to support the Rondebosch boys and staff and to help Old Boys maintain links with the school and with each other. The Old Boys' Union also raises funds for the benefit of both the Prep and High schools and provides other support. On 13 March 1913 the first official Founders' Day was commemorated by a cricket match between Old Boys and school boys. This tradition is still continued today with the addition of various other sports matches as well.

== Academics ==
Of the 158 final-year students who wrote the Western Cape Education Department exams in 2013, 146 passed at a Bachelor (Degree) level. The class achieved a 100% pass rate.

Year	No. of candidates who wrote	Pass rate	No. of candidates who passed at bachelor's degree level	Note
2013	158	100%	146	

Rondebosch has won the UCT Mathematics Competition nineteen times since 1998.

== Culture ==
=== Music ===
Music lessons are offered at the Music and Performing Arts Centre on the school premises. Rondebosch offers music as one of the grade 10-12 subject choices. In 2013, 7 candidates wrote the music exam, of those, 5 achieved "A" symbols and the class achieved an average of 83%.

== Sports ==
Rondebosch is the traditional rival of the nearby school Diocesan College (Bishops) as well as SACS and WBHS. Bishops is considered Rondebosch's main rival in rugby, with the first match between them played in 1908. Derby sport matches between the schools are played almost every weekend during the winter sports season a year in both rugby and cricket, as well as in a number of other sports. RBHS, Bishops, SACS and Wynberg Boys' High School participate in the annual Quadrangular athletics event, which dates back to 1934 and is claimed to be the longest-running inter-schools athletics meet in the country.

== Notable alumni ==
=== Business, culture, and sciences ===
- Whitey Basson, Businessman, founded Shoprite
- Peter Beaumont, archaeologist
- Allan McLeod Cormack, winner of the 1979 Nobel Prize in Physiology or Medicine for work on the development of Computer assisted tomography (CAT scan)
- David Earl, composer and concert pianist
- Chris Fallows, shark expert
- Robert Fokkens, composer
- Nick Gevers, science fiction critic and editor
- Nick Hamman, broadcaster and digital content creator
- Tim Jenkin, political prisoner, author, escapee from Pretoria Central Prison
- Jonathan C. Knight, physicist
- Daniel Rajna, principal ballet dancer with the Cape Town City Ballet Company
- Athelstan Spilhaus, scientist and inventor
- Lyall Watson, author
- Zapiro, cartoonist
- Ian Goldin founding Director of Oxford Martin School

=== Politician ===
- Ken Andrew, politician
- Ryan Coetzee, strategist for the Democratic Alliance
- Richard Spring, Baron Risby, former British MP

=== Law ===
- Franklin Berman, judge and international law specialist
- Michael Corbett, Chief Justice of South Africa
- Oliver Schreiner, judge of the Appellate Division of the Supreme Court of South Africa
- Sir Robert Clarkson Tredgold, Chief Justice of the Federation of Rhodesia and Nyasaland

=== Sports players ===
==== Athletics ====
- Italy: Marcello Fiasconaro

==== Football ====
- South Africa: Gary Bailey
- England: Gary Bailey

==== Tennis ====
- England: Neil Broad

==== Hockey ====
- South Africa: Andrew Cronje

==== Cricket ====
- South Africa: Gary Kirsten, HD Ackerman, John Commins, John Nel, Kenny Jackson, Paul Kirsten, Andrew Puttick, Zubayr Hamza
- England: Jonathan Trott
- (Republic of Ireland) Ireland: Ralph Coetzee
- Netherlands: Michael Rippon
- Daniel Moriarty, Surrey Cricket Player

==== Rugby ====
- South Africa (Springboks): Frank Mellish, Tommy Thompson, Albertus Viljoen van der Merwe, Bennie Osler, Jack Gage, James Stark, Mike Lawless, Ian McCallum, Chris Pope, Roy McCallum, Joel Stransky (at Rondebosch till his under 16 year), Hanyani Shimange, Gcobani Bobo,
- England: Frank Mellish
- (Republic of Ireland) Ireland: Dion O'Cuinneagain (captain), who also captained the South African Sevens side.
- (United States) USA Sevens: Dallen Stanford
- Germany: Justin Melck
- France: Eric Melville
- (United States) USA: Marcel Brache
- Hong Kong: Matthew Rosslee
- (South Africa) South African Sevens: Zain Davids, Dalvon Blood

== Notable past teachers ==
- Sydney Skaife

== See also ==
- List of secondary schools in the Western Cape
