= Oude Molen Technical High School =

Coordinates: 33.9244°S 18.5043°E

Location
- 15 Jan Smuts Drive, Pinelands; Cape Town, Western Cape; South Africa

Information
- School type: Public
- Motto: Docere Mentem Manumque (Teach the Mind)
- Established: 1961; 65 years ago
- School number: +27 (021) 531 2108
- Principal: Mrs. Fatima Khan
- Staff: 50 full-time
- Grades: 8–12
- Age: 14 to 18
- Enrollment: 780 pupils
- Language: English & Afrikaans
- Schedule: 08:00 - 15:00
- Campus: Urban Campus
- Houses: Brenner; Mokoena; Shuttleworth; Soodyall
- Colours: Blue; White
- Song: "Oude Molen is the school for me"
- Nickname: Oudies
- Rival: Tuckshop prices
- Accreditation: Western Cape Education Department
- School fees: R18,160 (tuition)
- Website: http://www.oudemolen.org.za

Oude Molen Technical High School (Afrikaans: Hoër Tegniese Oude Molen) is a semi-private, dual-medium, co-educational technical school situated in Pinelands, Cape Town in the Western Cape province of South Africa. It is one of the top and most academic technical schools in Western Cape.
