= Corpus Christi Rugby Football Club =

Rugby team in Texas, U.S.

Corpus Christi Crabs
- Full name: Corpus Christi Rugby Football Club
- Union: Texas Rugby Union
- Nickname(s): Crabs
- Ground(s): Haas Middle School
- President: Louis Gaitan
- League(s): Division III South
Team kit

Corpus Christi Rugby Football Club (CCRFC) is a member of the Texas Rugby Union, an affiliate of the Western Rugby Union, as well as USA Rugby.

The CCRFC formed in 1973 as the Corpus Christi Islanders. That year, the first Texas Rugby Union Championships was held in Corpus Christi.

The Crabs play in the TRU Division III South along with McAllen Rugby Football Club, Alamo City Rugby Football Club, Galveston Rugby Football Club, University of Houston RFC, and St. Thomas University RFC.

The team are active members of the Corpus Christi community and have several community outreach programs including events and charitable donations.

== 7s By the Sea ==
Every July, the Corpus Christi Rugby Football Club hosts "7s By The Sea", a rugby 7s beach tournament that attracts players and clubs from throughout Texas and the world. It is played with regular rugby 7s laws, barefoot, and due to no goal posts on the beach, without kicking for points. It is tradition for the rugby to cost money, but the beer to be free at 7s By The Sea.
