= Manenberg Secondary School =

Information
- Established: 1976; 50 years ago

Manenberg Secondary School is a school in Manenberg, Cape Town, Western Cape. The school maintains steady enrollment despite its neighborhood being known for gang violence.

The school was established in 1976 under the Apartheid Government.

In 2023, a team from Manenberg Secondary received a top prize for their innovation in the World Travel Market Africa awards, which used artificial intelligence to enhance tourism sustainability.
