= Lavender Hill High School =

Location
- Lavender Hill, Cape Flats, Western Cape; South Africa
- Coordinates: 34.0671°S 18.4879°E

Information
- Type: Public, co-educational, Secondary school
- Motto: Knowledge Empowers
- Established: 1978
- Principal: Mr Fuad Viljoen
- Enrolment: 1,204
- Language: Afrikaans and English
- Colour: Lavender
- Website: lavenderhillhigh.co.za

Lavender Hill High School is a public secondary school located in Lavender Hill in the Cape Flats district of Cape Town, Western Cape, South Africa.

The school is in one of the more economically-deprived areas of the Western Cape. The school features a school hall (Fasieg Manie Hall), library, gym, three computer rooms, kitchen, a baseball field, hockey astroturf, rugby field, softball field and stand, soccer astroturf, 2 netball courts, clubhouse, a multi-purpose hall(all shared facilities with Prince George Primary School, Levana Primary School and Hillwood Primary School). It employees 37 teachers along with 15 support staff in various roles such as administration and cleaning & maintenance.

The official languages of the school are Afrikaans and English. Students are placed in either Afrikaans or English classes depending on their native tongue.

In 2013 Sir Richard Branson visited the school to launch Virgin Active South Africa's FUTURE CREW programme, which encourages South African students to be more active. The company also assisted in funding the construction of a gym at the school
