= Darul Islam Islamic High School =

Islamic high school in Athlone, Cape Town, South Africa

Coordinates: 33.978011°S 18.540764°E

- Athlone, Cape Town; South Africa

Information
- Established: 1995; 31 years ago
- Founder: Sheikh Irafaan Abrahams

Darul Islam Islamic High School is a semi-private school based in Greenhaven, Athlone, Cape Town. The school was established in 1995, by the current Muslim Judicial Council president Sheikh Irafaan Abrahams.
