= St. Cyprian's School, Cape Town =

St Cyprian's School

Location
- Gorge Road, Oranjezicht; Cape Town, Western Cape; South Africa; 33°56′30″S 18°25′02″E

Information
- School type: Private & Boarding
- Motto: Latin: Sapientiae timor domini initium (The fear of the Lord is the beginning of wisdom)
- Religious affiliation: Anglican
- Patron saint: Cyprian
- Established: 1871; 155 years ago
- Founder: The Rt Revd Robert Gray, Bishop of Cape Town
- Locale: Suburban
- Sister school: Diocesan College, St George's Grammar School
- Principal: Mrs Shelley Frayne
- Exam board: IEB
- Chaplain: Rev. Andrew Weiss
- Grades: 000 - 12
- Gender: Female
- Age: 3 to 18
- Enrollment: 900 girls
- Language: English
- Schedule: 08:00 - 14:45
- Campus: Nooitgedacht
- Houses: Anderson; Darke; Verinder
- Colours: Blue; Gold; White
- School fees: R102,600-R127,800 (Grades 1-7 tuition); R160,100 (Grades 8-12 tuition); R136,800 (weekly boarding); R145,200 (full boarding)
- Website: www.stcyprians.co.za

St Cyprian's School is an independent (private) school for girls, in Grades 000 to 12, in Oranjezicht, Cape Town, Western Cape, South Africa.

The school follows the IEB curriculum, but since 2022, Grade 11 and Grade 12 students may opt to follow the Cambridge curriculum and write A-Level examinations instead of the National Senior Certificate. Full or weekly boarding is available to high school students. Short-term boarding is also available to day girls in the high school, subject to availability. Summer sports offered at St Cyprian's include Athletics, Basketball, Indoor Hockey, Swimming, Tennis, and Water Polo. Winter sports include Cross Country, Field Hockey, Netball, and Soccer. The campus is situated on the lower slopes of Table Mountain and has a scenic view. The school is also a member of the G20 Schools Group.

== History ==
St Cyprian's was founded in 1871 by the Rt Revd Robert Gray (bishop of Cape Town), the first Anglican bishop of Cape Town. The school has an Anglican foundation, holding termly Eucharists, and weekly chapel services.

St Cyprian's girls involve themselves in charity work around Cape Town and the school is a member of the Round Square international community of schools.
