= Salt River Secondary School =

School in Cape Town, South Africa

Salt River Secondary School is a school in the Western Cape

Address: Rochester Rd, Salt River, Cape Town, 7935
