= Phoenix Secondary School =

Coordinates: 29°42′55″S 31°0′58″E

Phoenix Secondary School is a school in the Western Cape.
