= Bridgetown Secondary School =

Coordinates: 33°57′30″S 18°31′49″E

Location
- Western Cape; South Africa

Bridgetown Secondary School is a school in the Western Cape.
