= Dallen Stanford =

South African-born rugby union player and commentator

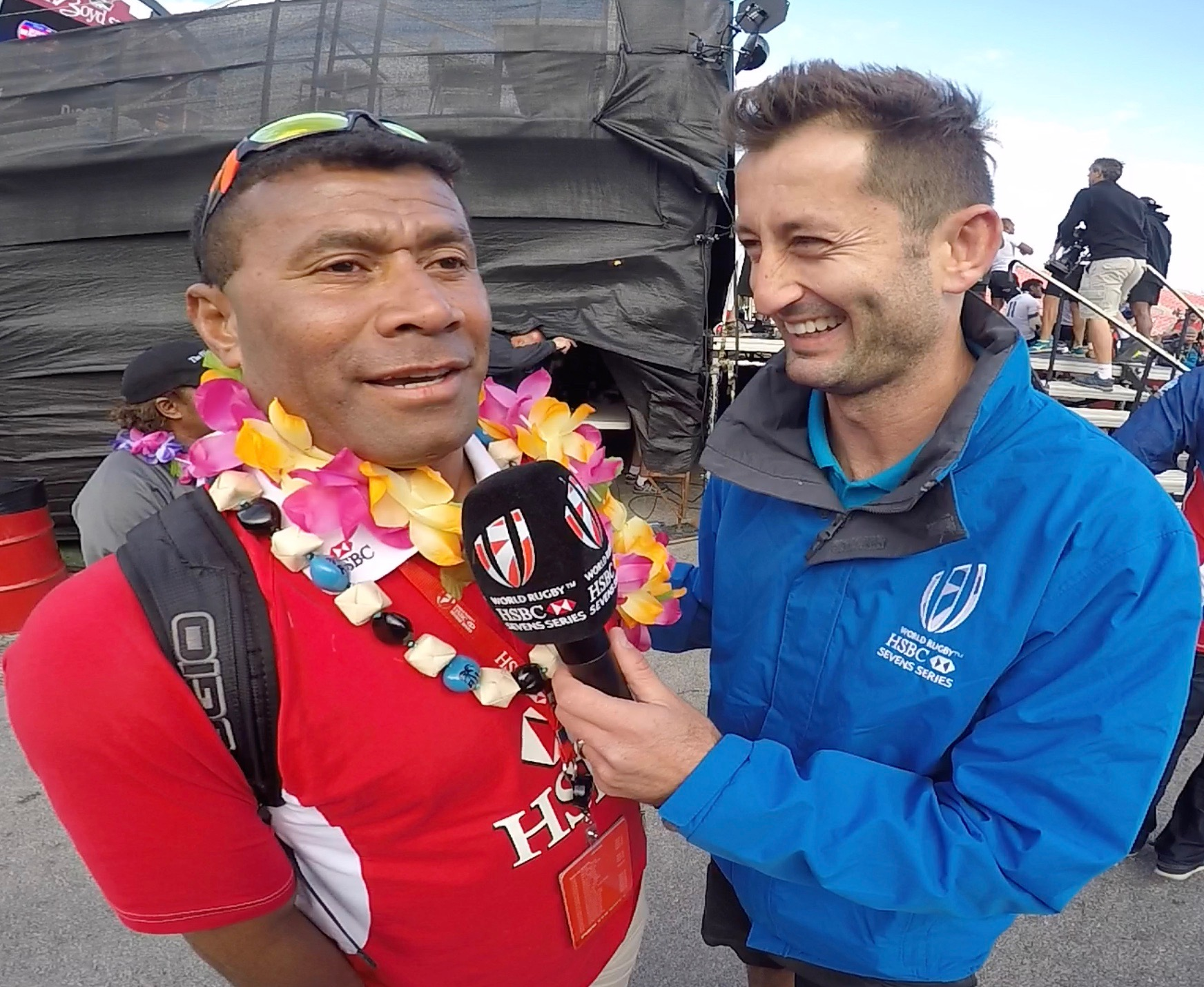
- Stanford interviewing Waisale Serevi
- Born: 16 May 1979 (age 47) Cape Town, South Africa
- School: Rondebosch Boys' High School
- University: University of Cape Town
- Occupation(s): Rugby commentator and broadcaster

Rugby union career
National sevens team
Years	Team	Comps
2007–2009	United States	12
Medal record
Representing United States
Men's rugby sevens
Maccabiah Games
Gold medal – first place	2013 Israel	Sevens
Pan American Maccabi Games
Gold medal – first place	2015 Santiago	Sevens

Dallen Stanford (born 16 May 1979) is a South African-born American rugby commentator and former rugby union sevens player who represented the United States on the World Rugby Sevens Series.

He is notable as the first South African and first American lead commentator on the World Rugby World Feed for a Rugby World Cup. He was one of only four lead commentators on the World Feed for the 2019 Rugby World Cup in Japan, and also commentated at the 2023 Rugby World Cup in France.

Stanford has served as a lead commentator on the World Rugby Sevens Series since 2016, covering events for nearly a decade in the USA (Las Vegas and Los Angeles), Canada (Vancouver and Edmonton), Singapore, Hong Kong, France (Toulouse), Spain (Malaga and Seville), and South Africa (Cape Town). His coverage includes the 2018 Rugby World Cup Sevens in San Francisco and the 2022 Rugby World Cup Sevens in Cape Town. He has called Major League Rugby since 2018, and in 2022 commentated his 75th MLR match as lead commentator, the Western Conference Final on Fox Sports. He has worked for networks including Fox Sports, CBS Sports Network, ESPN and Peacock.

He has contributed analysis to rugby media outlets including Talking Rugby Union and FloRugby.

He is recognized for his contributions to rugby development, receiving the Athletes in Excellence Award from the Foundation for Global Sports Development for community and youth work through Play Rugby USA.

== Early life and education ==
Stanford was born in South Africa and attended Rondebosch Boys' High School in Cape Town, where he played rugby alongside future Springboks Gcobani Bobo and Hanyani Shimange. He studied marketing at the Cape Technikon (now the Cape Peninsula University of Technology) and played rugby at the University of Cape Town, captaining the U21A Ikey Tigers side to an unbeaten season in 2000.

== Playing and coaching career ==
After moving to the United States in 2003, Stanford played club rugby for Occidental Olde Boys, Belmont Shore RFC, and the Austin Huns.

At Belmont Shore, Stanford was part of the USA Rugby national championship-winning teams in both 7s (2009) and 15s/Super League (2007), and also runners-up in 2008 and 2010. He was the tournament's top point scorer at the USA Rugby Club 7s National Championship in 2006.

He was named in the 2006–07 USA national sevens player pool by head coach Al Caravelli, and played on the World Rugby Sevens Series from 2007 to 2009, competing in twelve Series events and making 54 appearances for the United States, including the Rugby World Cup Sevens qualifiers in the Bahamas. He was also a travelling reserve for the 2009 Rugby World Cup Sevens in Dubai.

Stanford represented Team USA at the 2013 Maccabiah Games in Israel, captaining the sevens squad to gold, and served as a player/coach at the 2015 Pan American Maccabi Games, winning gold in 7s and silver in XVs.

Stanford was inducted into the Maccabi USA Rugby Hall of Fame in Chicago in 2023.

He coached the Austin Huns, Austin Valkyries, the University of Texas at Austin and Occidental College. In 2013 he coached Occidental to the National Small College Rugby Organization (NSCRO) national sevens title, beating the University of North Florida 28–15 in the final at PPL Park in Philadelphia during the Collegiate Rugby Championship weekend.

== Broadcast Academy ==
In 2025, Stanford founded the Broadcast Academy, an online training program for sports commentators, starting with rugby. It offers three courses: Broadcast Foundations, a self-paced course available in multiple languages; Broadcast Intensive, three live Zoom sessions covering play-by-play commentary, color commentary and sideline reporting; and Broadcast Mentorship, a monthly live coaching session. By April 2026, the academy had attracted more than 200 applicants aged 14 to 70 from 25 countries.

That month, more than 20 of its graduates commentated at the 2026 Collegiate Rugby Championship National 7s through a partnership with National Collegiate Rugby. Graduates have also commentated on the World Rugby Sevens Series and the 2025 Women's Rugby World Cup. Rugby Academy Ireland partnered with Stanford to deliver a broadcasting and media course as part of its curriculum.
