= Crystal Secondary School =

High School in South Africa

Coordinates: 33.99787°S 18.53689°E

Information
- Motto: Facta Non Verba (Deeds Not Words)
- Established: 1972; 54 years ago

Crystal Secondary School is a school in the Western Cape.

Crystal Secondary School was founded in 1972 and named after the daughter of its first principal, the late C. R. Fortuin. Its motto is Facta Non Verba (Deeds Not Words). According to the school's website, "[d]uring the 70’s the learners of this school were in the forefront of the struggle."
