= Belhar Secondary School =

High school in Cape Town, South Africa

Coordinates: 33.9445°S 18.6106°E

- Afrikaans: Belhar Sekondêre Skool

Information
- Grades: 8-12
- Enrollment: 1,225 (2006)
- Language: English/Afrikaans

Belhar Secondary School (Afrikaans: Belhar Sekondêre Skool) is an Afrikaans/English mixed medium school in Belhar, Western Cape, South Africa. As of 2006 it had 1,225 students and was staffed by 35 educators. . In 2006 the Western Cape Education Department designated it one of 10 "Arts and Culture focus schools" to be set up over the following three years.
