= Farouk Mayman =

South African water polo player

Personal information
- Full name: Mogamad Farouk Mayman
- Nationality: South African
- Born: 3 May 1999 (age 25)

Sport
- Country: South Africa
- Sport: Water polo

Mogamad Farouk Mayman (born 3 May 1999) is a South African water polo player. He competed in the 2020 Summer Olympics.
