= Peak View Secondary School =

- Western Cape; South Africa

Peak View Secondary School is a school in the Western Cape, South Africa.
