= Mountain View Academy =

Private high school in Cape Town, South Africa

- Cape Town; South Africa

Information
- School type: Private School
- Established: 2006; 20 years ago
- Teaching staff: 16
- Grades: 1-7
- Enrollment: 108 (2016)
- Student to teacher ratio: 7:1

Mountain View Academy (Africa) is a South African private school situated in Cape Town's northern suburb, Plattekloof Glen. Established in 2006, it features a primary school (Grade1 to 7).

Classrooms at Mountain View Academy at kept at a maximum of 10 learners per classroom per grade. The South Africa Department of Basic Education reported in December 2016 that enrollment at the school was 108 students, with 16 teachers, and a 7:1 student teacher ratio.

In 2018, Mountain View Academy established a "sister school" relationship with The Philile Project's Program in Gugulethu.
