= Oaklands Secondary School (Cape Town) =

School in Cape Town, South Africa

Coordinates: 33.98986°S 18.49358°E

Oaklands Secondary School is a school in the Western Cape of South Africa. It is located in the suburb of Lansdowne, in Cape Town.
