= Eersterivier Secondary School =

Adrikaans-medium high school in South Africa

Coordinates: 34°1′8″S 18°43′51″E

- Afrikaans: Eersterivier Sekondêre Skool

Information
- Established: 1995; 31 years ago
- Teaching staff: 43 (2006)
- Enrollment: 1443 (2006)
- Language: Afrikaans

Eersteriver Secondary School (Afrikaans: Eersterivier Sekondêre Skool) is an Afrikaans-medium school in Eerste River in the Western Cape, South Africa.

== History ==
It was established in 1995 and as of 2006 it had some 1,443 students and 43 educators . In 2006 the Western Cape Education Department designated it one of 10 "Arts and Culture focus schools" to be set up over the following three years. Eersteriver Secondary school is now being linked to Teddington School
