= Alamo City Rugby Football Club =

Alamo City Rugby
- Full name: Alamo City Rugby Football Club
- Union: USA Rugby
- Nickname: The Defenders
- Founded: 1983
- Location: San Antonio, Texas
- Ground: Bowie Field (Brooks Park)
- President: (United States) Patrick Costello
- Coach: (New Zealand) Timothy Guillaume
- League: Texas Rugby Union

Official website
- alamocityrfc.com

The Alamo City Rugby Football Club (informally Alamo City RFC or Alamo City Rugby) is an American rugby union club that is based in San Antonio, Texas. Alamo City RFC plays in the Texas Rugby Union Men's Division 2 league. Home matches are held at the Bowie Field rugby pitches located inside Brooks Park in southeast San Antonio. The club's nickname is "The Defenders".

== History ==
In 1983, the Alamo City Rugby Football Club was started by a small group of players who were interested in promoting rugby in San Antonio, Texas. Over the years, the club has grown to support high school, collegiate, masters (“old boys”), military, and currently, men's division II. A great achievement for the club was when the high school team received 2nd, 3rd, and 6th-place finishes in the National High School Championships. The fathering of the high school program helped the club achieve its 501(c)-3 status as a non-profit organization with exemption from state franchise and sales tax.

In 2001, Alamo City RFC expanded its club by starting a women's side, which formed by word of mouth through the men's club and local soccer leagues. Most of the women had little exposure to rugby prior to joining Alamo City RFC, but quickly adapted to the change in rules and techniques. The women's team ceased operations in 2007 due to a dwindling numbers restricting them from fielding a side.

=== Bowie Field ===
The club notably obtained the land for Bowie Field, which was named after Dr. Neil Bowie for his never-ending support to the club. The 10-acre (40,000 m^{2}) site has a regulation rugby playing pitch and a lighted practice pitch. The lighted practice pitch was named the Kevin Howell Memorial Pitch after the late Kevin Howell. This facility is San Antonio's first of its kind. It is located south of Brooks City-Base on Goliad Rd.

ACRFC Logo

== Community involvement ==
ACRFC contributes to the community of San Antonio by holding events and assisting in local charity fundraisers. The club has affiliated with the Harp and Shamrock Society, Target 90 Goals for San Antonio, and other local organizations. Alamo City RFC does an annual toy delivery to children in support of the San Antonio Elf Louise Program. In addition, ACRFC members volunteer at the San Antonio Food Bank.

Members of Alamo City Rugby have donated their time and money to the Cystic Fibrosis Foundation. Specifically representing the Lone Star Chapter, ACRFC participates in the San Antonio CF Great Strides, and the CF Tower Climb. Participants will run a mile prior to running up the stairs of the Tower of the Americas in downtown San Antonio.

In 2015, ACRFC started participating in the Special Olympics Texas Fire Truck Pull. Members of ACRFC raise money for the entry fee and extra for the event, with all proceeds going to Special Olympics Texas. The event consists of 12 members to pull a fire truck 40 yards. The team with the fastest average time wins. With more than 20+ teams entered each year, ACRFC has won the competition in 2015 and 2016.

Beginning in 2010, a few members of ACRFC began donating their time coaching the reinvigorated collegiate rugby programs of the University of Texas at San Antonio UTSA Roadrunners and St. Mary's University, Texas Rattler Rugby.

== Fiesta 7s Tournament ==
In 1984, Alamo City RFC joined the Fiesta San Antonio Commission, and has since hosted the Alamo City Rugby Fiesta 7s Tournament annually. The Fiesta 7s tournament is held each spring in April during “Fiesta San Antonio”. Rugby sevens is played at the Fiesta Tournament, and is usually played in some type of round-robin tournament format. Teams from across Texas, and the nation, participate. In addition, teams from Europe, such as British Caldonia, Twickingham, Imber Court, England's Royal Engineers, Ireland's Arklow, and The Old Hirelings of France have traveled to San Antonio and played in the tournament.

=== Commandant's Cup Trophy ===
Although the Fiesta Tournament is a rugby sevens tournament, Alamo City RFC invites three of the United States military academies (United States Air Force Academy, United States Naval Academy, and the United States Military Academy) to participate in a round-robin tournament for the Commandant's Cup. Each military academy enters a full rugby union (15-a side) team to compete for the cup.
