= Ned Doman High School =

Ned Doman High School is a school in the Western Cape of South Africa.
