= Pinelands, Cape Town =

Place in Western Cape, South Africa

Pinelands
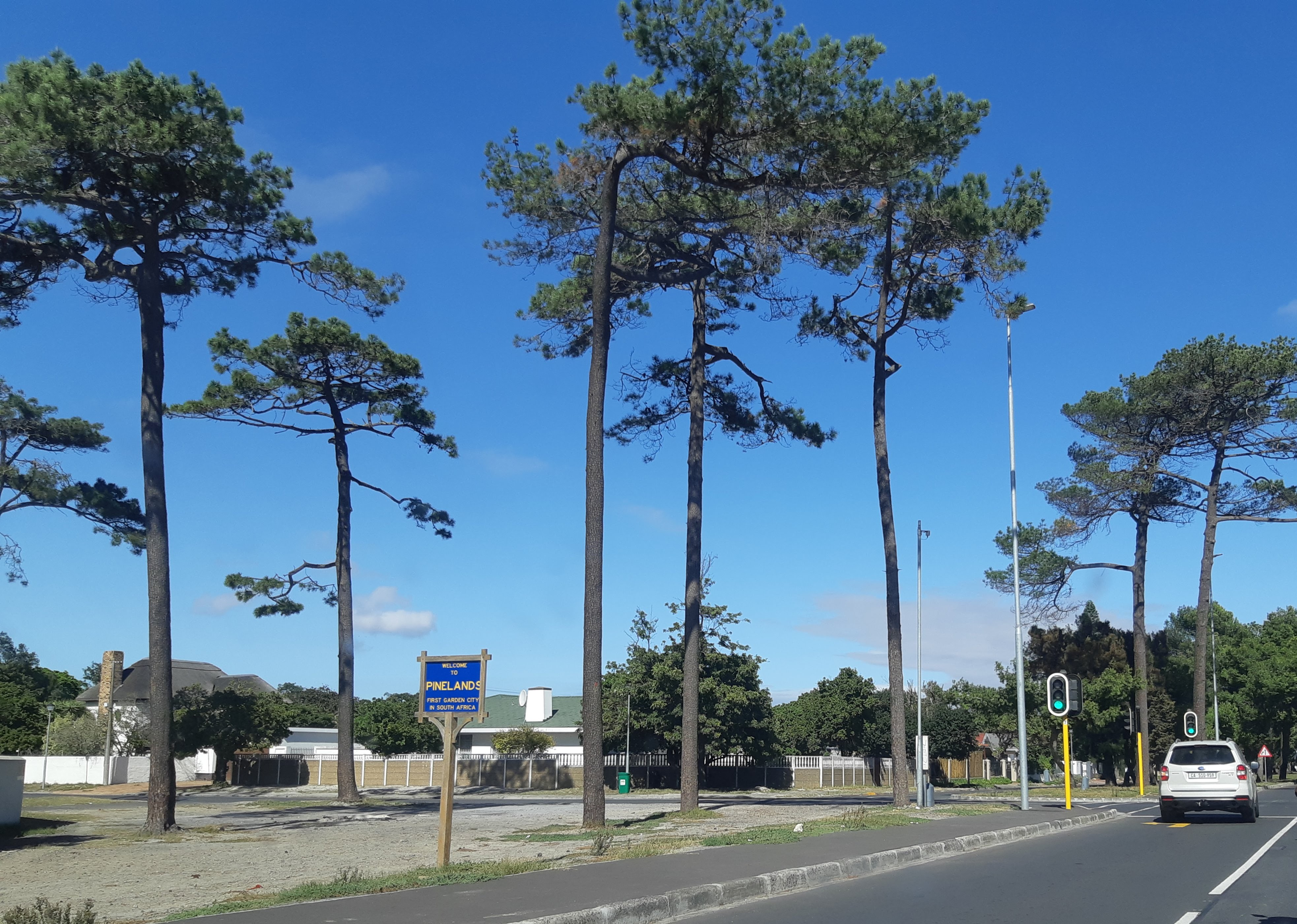
- A view down Forest Drive, entering Pinelands, with pine trees in the foreground
- Interactive map of Pinelands
- Location within Western Cape Location within South Africa Location within Africa
- Coordinates: 33°55′54″S 18°30′46″E
- Country: South Africa
- Province: Western Cape
- Municipality: City of Cape Town
- Main Place: Cape Town
- Established: 1919; 107 years ago

Government
  - Councillor: Riad Davids (DA)

Area
  - Total: 5.86 km^{2} (2.26 sq mi)

Population (2011)
  - Total: 14,198
  - Density: 2,420/km^{2} (6,280/sq mi)

Racial makeup (2011)
  - Black African: 13.5%
  - Coloured: 15.1%
  - Indian/Asian: 5.1%
  - White: 62.3%
  - Other: 4.0%

First languages (2011)
  - English: 81.5%
  - Afrikaans: 8.4%
  - Xhosa: 3.5%
  - Other: 6.5%
- Time zone: UTC+2 (SAST)
- Postal code (street): 7405
- PO box: 7430
- Area code: (021) 531/2

Pinelands is a large garden city suburb (the first of its kind in Africa and one of the first in the world), located 8 kilometres (5.0 mi) east of the city centre of Cape Town, South Africa.

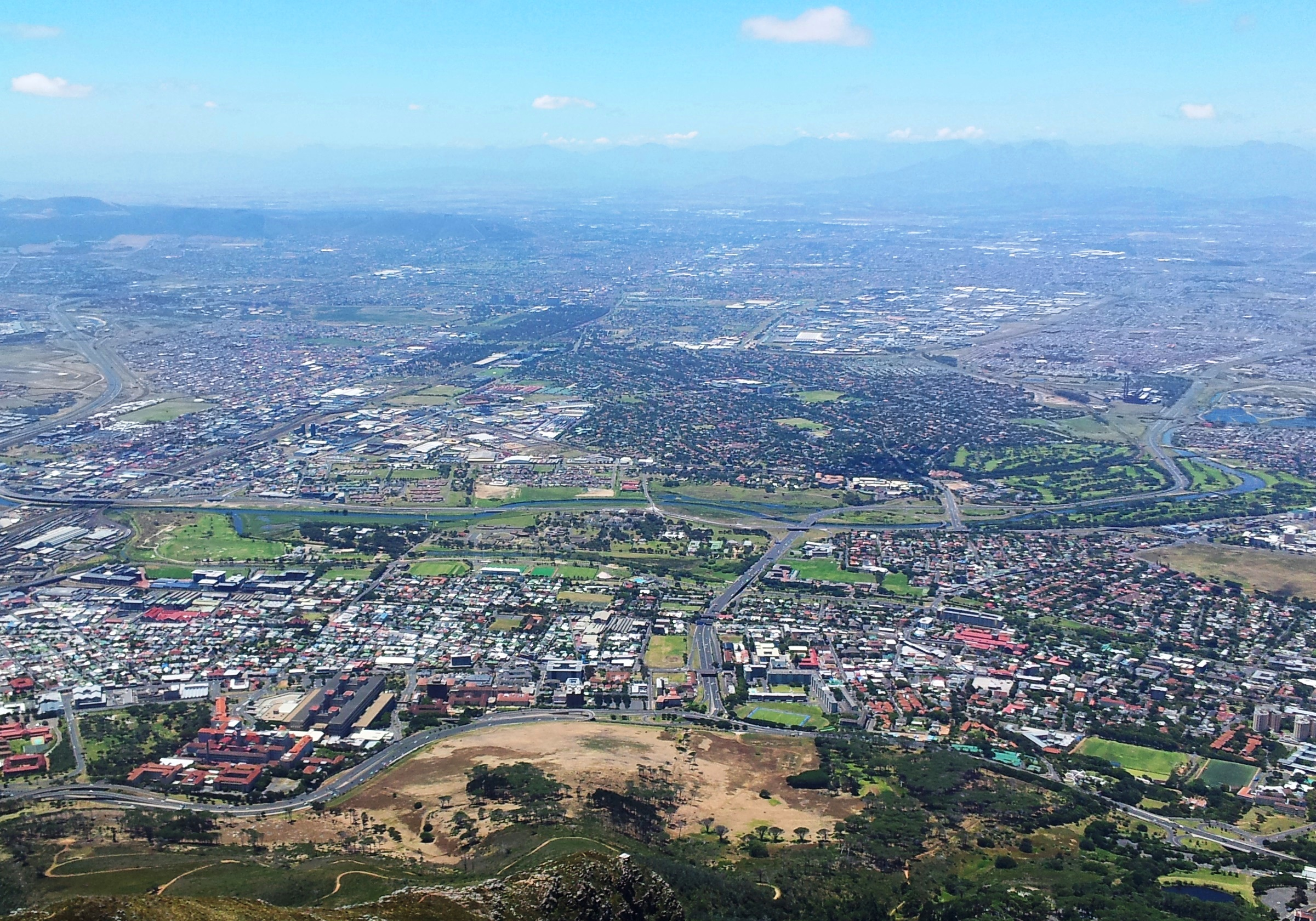
Pinelands (center-right), showing its density of trees. The suburb was Africa's first garden city, and one of the first in the world. As such, it's home to a large amount of green space for residents to enjoy

The neighborhood is known for its large thatched houses, green spaces, and convenient central location within Cape Town. Pinelands is primarily zoned for residential use, and is often praised for its peacefulness and abundance of tall trees.

The suburb notable as the only one in South Africa in which sale of alcohol to the public is entirely prohibited. Numerous establishments (such as major supermarkets Pick n Pay and Woolworths have, over the past decades, tried to apply for liquor licenses for the area, but all have been met with strong objection by Pinelands residents, who have opted to keep the suburb dry.

In 2022, the Pinelands Ratepayers and Residents Association (PRRA) confirmed that the suburb would continue to remain dry, avoiding the social ills associated with alcohol, and assisting other suburbs who also wish to attain the same status.

== History ==
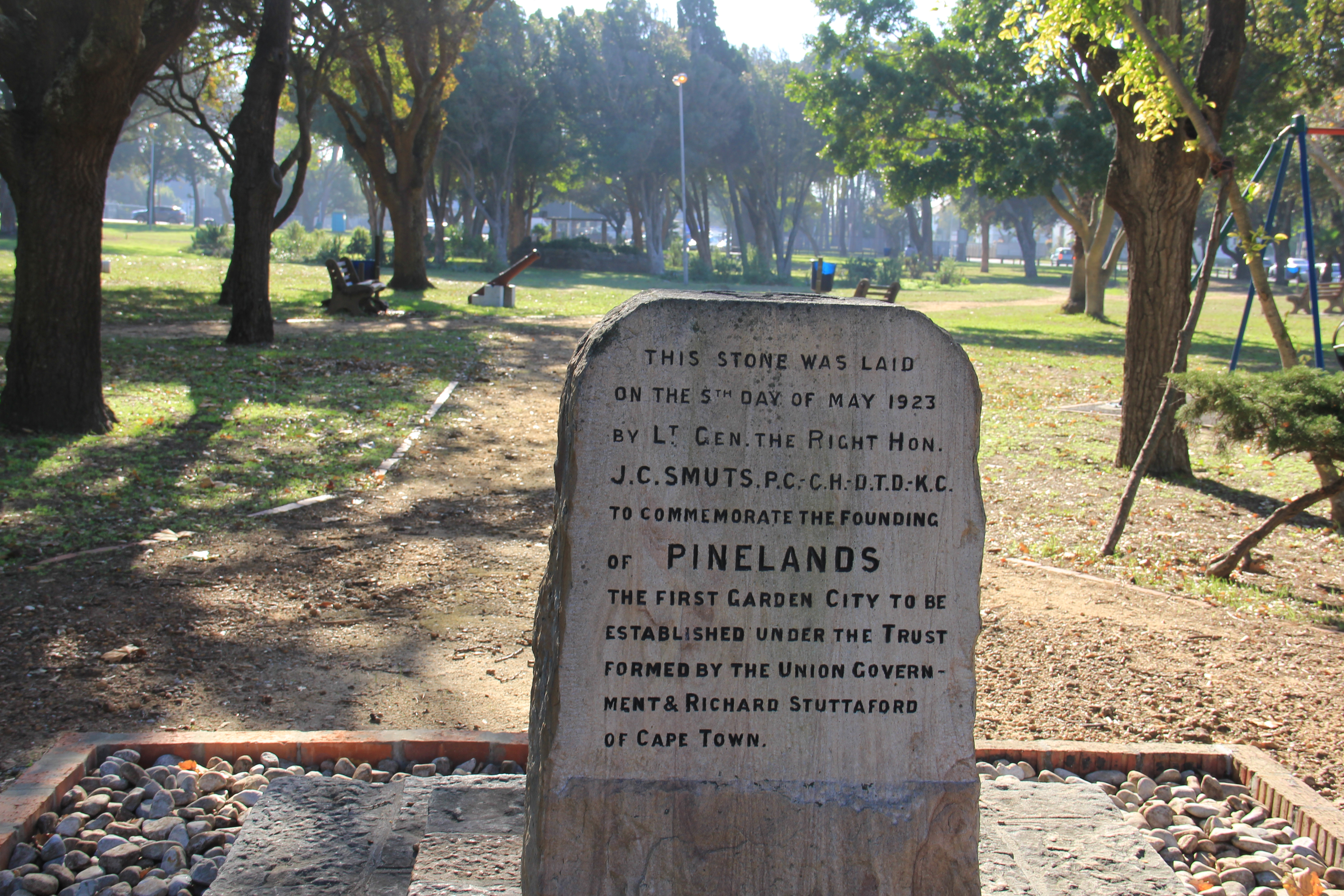
Foundation stone commemorating the establishment of Pinelands in 1923

The layout of Pinelands is based on the then revolutionary Garden Cities methodology of town planning by the British town-planner, Sir Ebenezer Howard. It was originally a Victorian era farm named Uitvlugt that had thousands of pine trees planted in it, and was later deemed an economic failure by the Department of Forestry.

In the aftermath of the outbreak of the bubonic plague in Cape Town in February 1901, the colonial health authorities invoked Public Health Act of 1897 and quickly established a location in Uitvlugt Forest Station (modern day Pinelands). Black Africans living in District Six were rounded up under armed guard and taken to the location of Uitvlugt.

This area was initially established primarily to quarantine Black Africans who were forcibly relocated after the outbreak of the disease, furthering efforts of the government at the time to push Black and Coloured communities to the outskirts of the city. This marked the beginning of forced removals in Cape Town in the twentieth century.

Almost 22 years later, the land was then granted to "The Garden Cities Trust" and the founding Deed of Trust was signed in 1919. One of the first members of the trust, Richard Stuttaford (head of the department store Stuttafords), made a £10,000 gift donation to serve as capital, and a loan of £15,000 from the government was invested in Pinelands. The trust brought in an overseas expert, Albert John Thompson, in 1920 to design the area.

The first house to be occupied in Pinelands was a thatched building situated at 3 Mead Way, built in February 1922. The house and the entire street, including The Mead, were declared a national monument in 1983. The original township area is currently a proposed heritage area.

By the end of 1922, 24 homes had been established in Pinelands, and Pinelands had a total population of 60 people. Electricity was installed in late 1922 and early 1923. By 1924, 10 streetlights were operational in the area.

By 1942, the population of Pinelands had reached 20,000 residents, with the area having over 3,000 houses, 750 condos, and two shopping centers (Howard Centre and Central Square).

Pinelands converted to a municipality in 1948, and in 1996, merged into the City of Cape Town metropolitan municipality. The old Pinelands Town Council offices now accommodate the Pinelands subcouncil offices, with Pinelands being part of the City of Cape Town's Subcouncil 16.

== Geography ==
Pinelands is situated 8 kilometres (5.0 mi) east of the Cape Town CBD. The neighborhood is conveniently located close to many regions of the city, such as the CBD, Century City, the V&A Waterfront, Cape Town International Airport, and the Atlantic Seaboard. It is therefore a desirable area for those who often commute to different parts of the city.

Pinelands has been variously associated with both the Northern Suburbs and Southern Suburbs regions of Cape Town.

The main road traversing Pinelands is Forest Drive. The suburb is bisected from the north east to the south west by the Elsieskraal River, which has flowed through a large concrete drainage canal since the 1970s. Elsieskraal River also flows through the neighboring suburb of Thornton, which is a similar residential suburb with an abundance of trees.

The postcodes for Pinelands are 7405 for street addresses and 7430 or 7450 for post office boxes. The telephone exchange codes for Pinelands (within the 021 dialling code for Cape Town) are predominantly 531 and 532.

== Notability ==
Pinelands is notable as being the first garden city suburb in Africa, as well as one of the world's first garden city suburbs, having been established in 1920. The area is home to a sign that says, "Welcome to Pinelands, South Africa’s first Garden City".

The garden city movement in the 20th century sought to establish communities in a way that captured the primary benefits of the countryside and the city, while avoiding the disadvantages presented by both. It emphasized green spaces, which are still a major element of Pinelands.

The suburb is also notable for being the only one in South Africa where the sale of alcohol is entirely prohibited. Keeping the suburb dry has been driven by Pinelands residents over many decades, and this continues to be the case. Residents state the reason as creating a community that avoids the negative social aspects that accompany alcohol.

In 2022, the Pinelands Ratepayers and Residents Association (PRRA) confirmed that the suburb would continue to remain dry.

== Demographics ==
According to the 2011 census, the population of Pinelands was 14,198 people, residing in 4,917 households. The following tables show various demographic data about Pinelands from that census.

Gender

Gender	Population	%
Female	7,596	53.5%
Male	6,602	46.5%

Ethnic Group

Group	Population	%
Black African	1,917	13.5%
Coloured	2,142	15.1%
Indian/Asian	720	5.1%
White	8,845	62.3%
Other	574	4.0%

Home Language

Language	Population	%
English	10,868	81.5%
Afrikaans	1,125	8.4%
Xhosa	470	3.5%
Other SA languages	297	2.2%
Other languages	568	4.3%

Age

Age range	Population	%
0–4	805	5.7%
5–14	1,517	10.7%
15–24	2,023	14.3%
25–64	7,508	52.9%
65+	2,343	16.5%

== Culture ==
=== Ratepayers' Association ===
Pinelands is represented by the active Pinelands Ratepayers & Residents Association (PRRA), a body whose stated goal it is to continue to make Pinelands a desirable place to live, work, and visit. The PPRA hosts annual general meetings, engages with residents and local politicians on issues affecting the suburb, and promotes Pinelands' community cohesiveness, distinct historical character, and the interests of its residents.

=== Sports ===
Pinelands has sporting facilities including tennis and lawn bowling clubs. Other sports include the cricket and hockey clubs situated at The Oval sports grounds situated on St. Stephens Road just off Forest Drive.

Pinelands hockey club was founded in 1937 and is currently one of the largest clubs in the country fielding 12 men’s teams and 7 ladies teams in the Western Province Hockey Union league. Both the men’s and ladies’ first teams play in the Grand Challenge league with the men's team having won the title for the first time in 2006.

In 2008, Pinelands Hockey Club produced three Olympians – Marvin Bam, Paul Blake, and Austin Smith. The latter was made the South African Men's Captain, having first played hockey for the Red School, and Pinelands High School.

== Housing ==
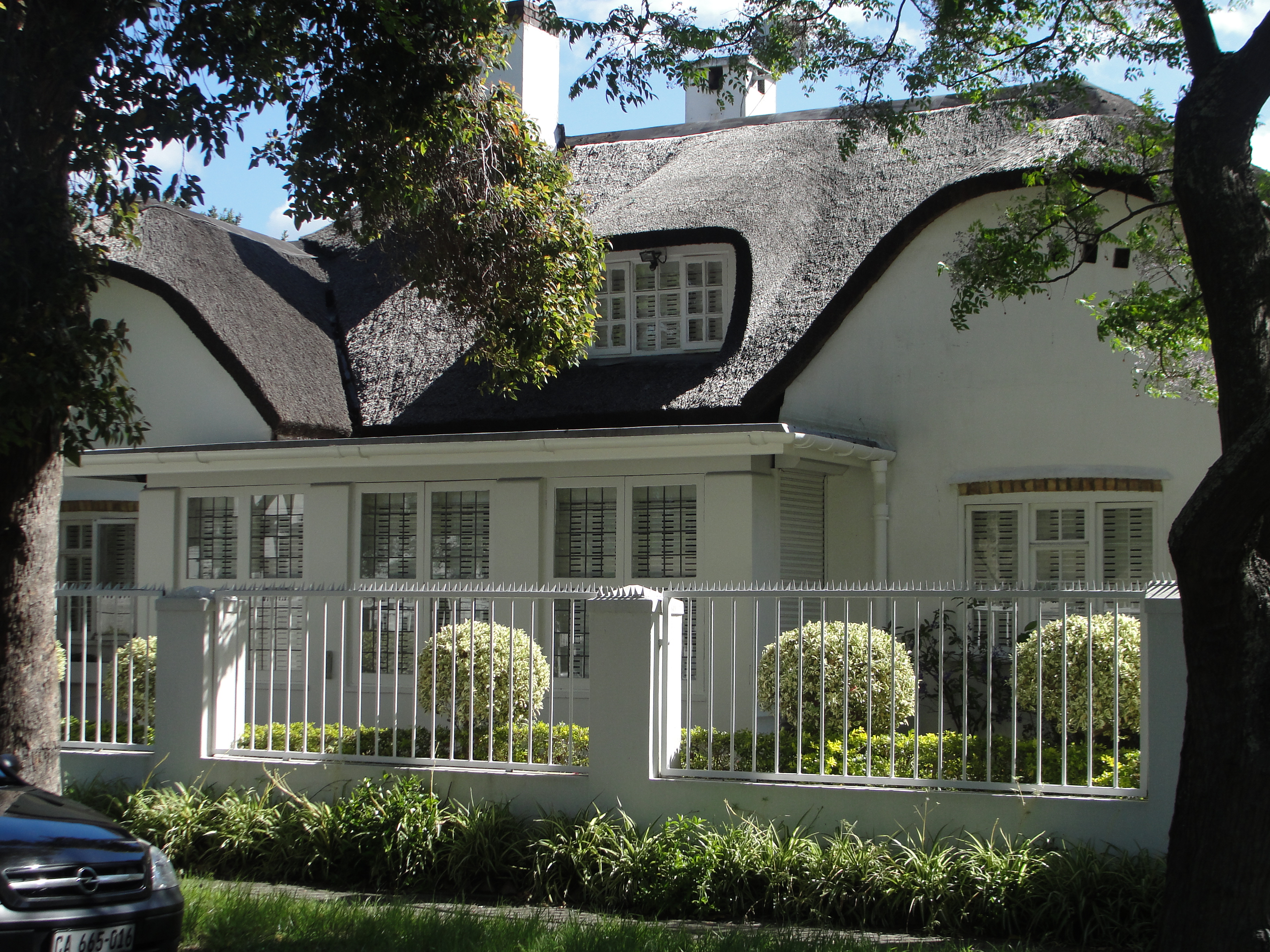
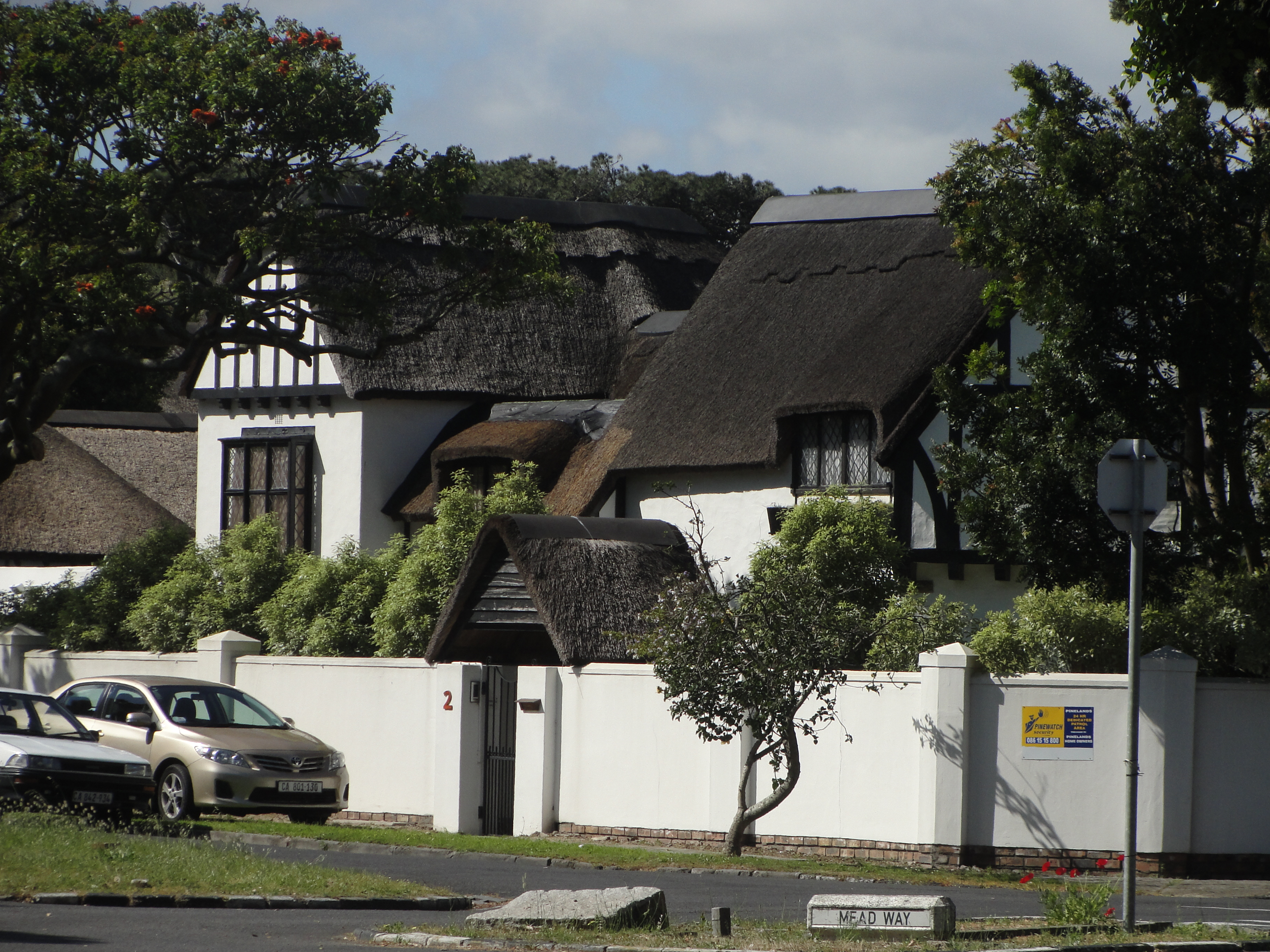
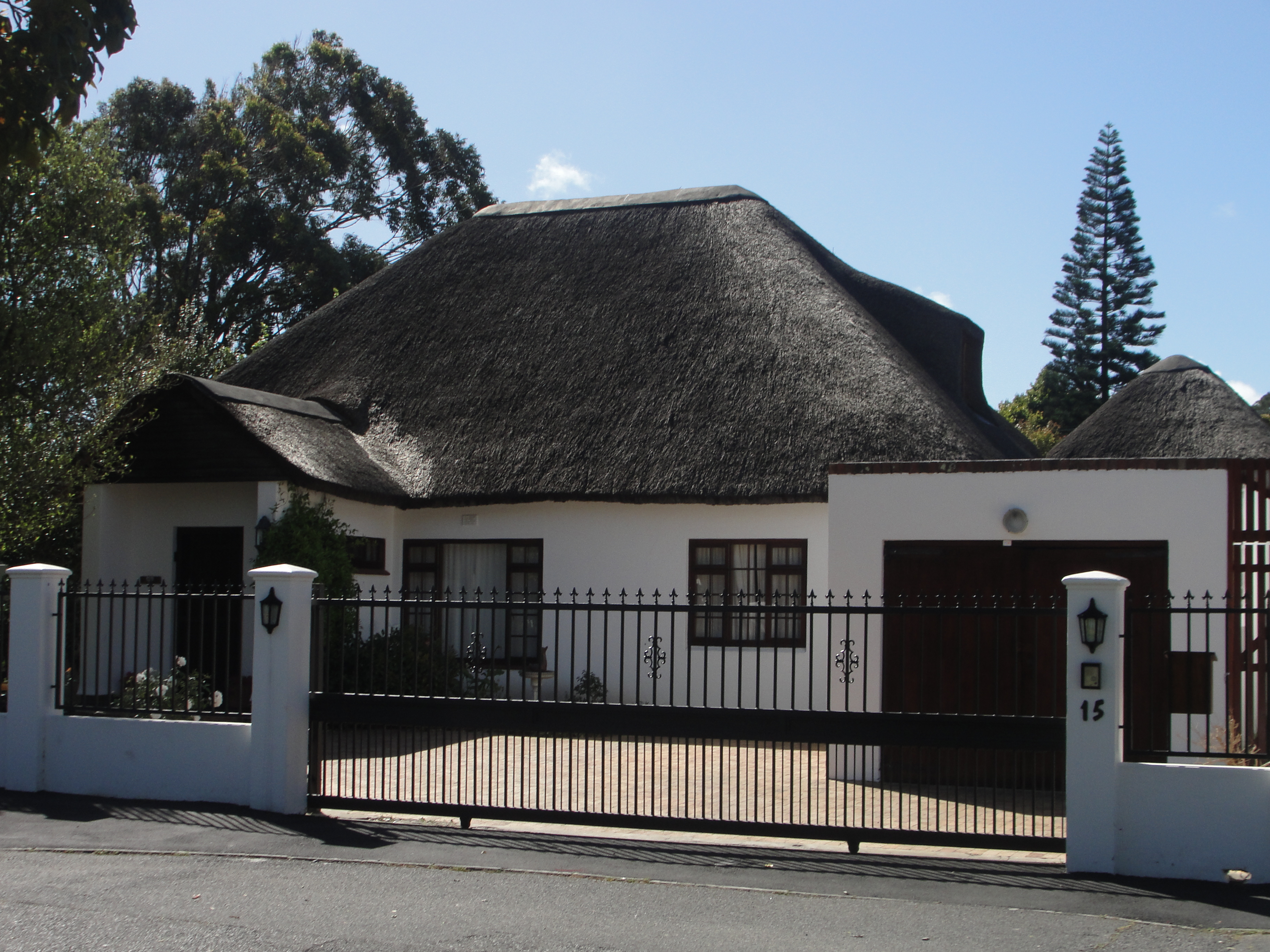
Various styles of thatched houses in Pinelands. The area is known for its thatched roofs

Pinelands consists mostly of detached homes, with large plots, situated along tree-lined streets. The area does also have some condos.

In February 2026, the average price of a three to six bedroom detached home in Pinelands was R5.2 million, making it one of the more expensive suburbs in Cape Town. In the same month, the average price of a 2-bedroom condo in Pinelands was R1.69 million.

== Infrastructure & amenities ==
=== Transit ===
Pinelands is served by two Metrorail railway stations; Pinelands Station on the western edge of the suburb, and Mutual Station on the northern edge, close to the regional office for major South African financial services company Old Mutual, after which the station is named.

=== Road names ===
Many of the road names in Pinelands have originated from local history or from places in England. One such road is named Uitvlugt (original Dutch) after the historical farm of the same name that covered what is now Pinelands. There are also roads named Letchworth and Welwyn, after the first two garden cities in England.

Other roads in Pinelands are named after places in the Lake District in England, the Royal Family as well as the names of birds, trees and flowers. Despite the attitude displayed to the sale of alcohol in Pinelands, there is a section where all the roads are named after well known wine farms.

=== Schools ===
In Pinelands there are three public primary schools, each of which is commonly known in the community by a specific colour: Pinelands Primary School ("The Blue School"), Pinelands North Primary School ("The Red School"), and Pinehurst Primary School ("The Green School"). Pinelands High School, a public high school, is centrally located in the suburb.

Cannons Creek Independent School is a private combined primary and high school. Grace Primary School is a Christian primary school embracing a Charlotte Mason education philosophy.

There are three private pre-primaries in Pinelands: Meerendal Pre-Primary, La Gratitude Pre-Primary, Learn and Play Centre Pre-School and Old Mutual for their employees. The high school campus of Vista Nova (a school for children with cerebral palsy and other special needs) is located in the suburb.

The Pinelands Campus of the College of Cape Town while located in Maitland is on the northern edge of Pinelands and draws students from all over Cape Town.

=== Retail ===
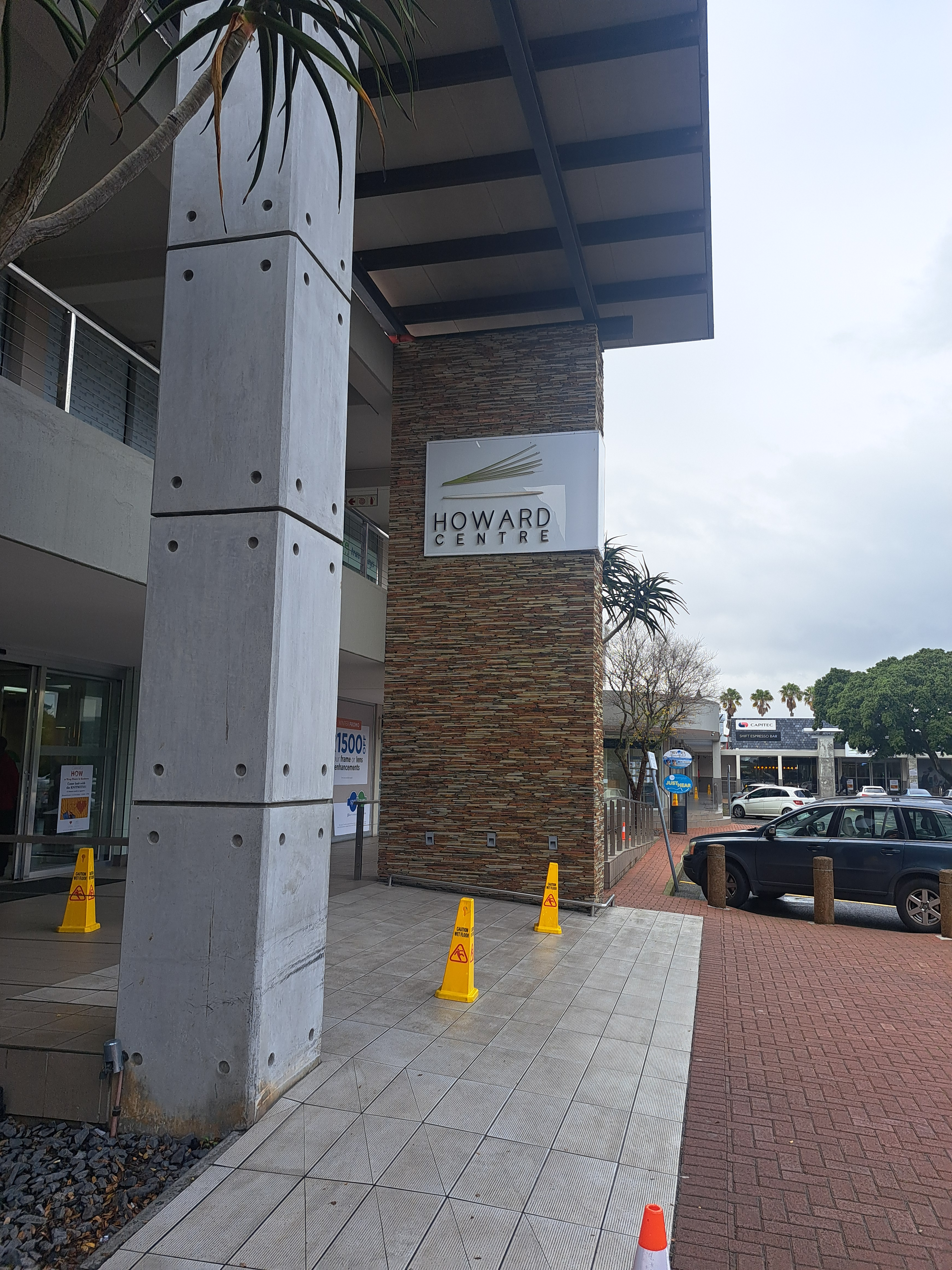
Entrance to Howard Centre, a shopping center in Pinelands

Pinelands contains two small shopping centers. The first, and largest, is Howard Centre, which is located on Howard Drive. Both the road and the shopping center are named after Ebenezer Howard, who led the 20th century garden city movement upon which Pinelands was established. The second retail center is Central Square.

=== Healthcare ===
Life Healthcare Group's Vincent Pallotti Hospital and its consulting suites are located along Alexandra Road in Pinelands, as is the Western Cape Dental Laboratory, and Netcare's Medicross Pinelands clinic.

== Politics ==
Pinelands is part of ward 53 within Subcouncil 16 of the City of Cape Town. The ward also includes Thornton, Maitland Garden Village, Epping Industria 1, Ndabeni and part of Maitland.

The ward is currently represented by Councilor Riad Davids of the Democratic Alliance.

Of the six voting districts in ward 53, three cover Pinelands. Voting stations for Pinelands are situated at Pinelands Primary School, Pinelands High School, and Pinehurst Primary School. Generally, the majority of voters in Pinelands vote for the Democratic Alliance.

The following tables show the sum of the votes cast in the three Pinelands voting districts at the most recent national, provincial and local elections.

National election (2019)

Party	Votes	%
Democratic Alliance	5,492	74.7%
African National Congress	894	12.2%
African Christian Democratic Party	295	4.0%
Good	146	2.0%
Economic Freedom Fighters	143	1.9%
26 other parties	386	5.2%
Total	7,356	100%

Provincial election (2019)

Party	Votes	%
Democratic Alliance	5,892	80.4%
African National Congress	513	7.0%
Good	288	3.9%
African Christian Democratic Party	207	2.8%
Economic Freedom Fighters	130	1.8%
22 other parties	298	4.1%
Total	7,328	100%

Local election (2021)

Proportional Representation vote

Party	Votes	%
Democratic Alliance	4,658	81.0%
Good	314	5.5%
African Christian Democratic Party	196	3.4%
African National Congress	164	2.9%
46 other parties	41.8	7.3%
Total	5,750	100%

Local election (2021)

Ward vote

Candidate	Votes	%
Riad Davids (DA)	5,145	82.7%
Ingrid Simons (Good)	269	4.3%
Richard Bougard (ACDP)	248	4.0%
Brenda Skelenge (ANC)	192	3.1%
30 other candidates	368	5.9%
Total	7,122	100%

== Coat of arms ==
Coat of arms of Pinelands

In January 1949, the municipal council assumed a coat of arms, designed by F. de Beaumont Beech. It registered the arms with the Cape Provincial Administration in July 1954 and at the Bureau of Heraldry in July 1979.

The arms were : Or, on a chevron Gules, between three fir-cones Sable, slipped and leaved Vert, three annulets Or (i.e. a golden shield depicting, from top to bottom, two black fir-cones with green leaves, a red chevron displaying three golden rings, and another black fir-cone with green leaves). The crest was a squirrel holding an acorn, and the motto was Fides – prudentia – labor.

== Notable residents ==
- Colin Eglin, politician, grew up in Pinelands in the 1930s and was the area's ward councillor from 1951 to 1954.

== See also ==
- Huis der Nederlanden
- Northern Suburbs, Cape Town
- Alcohol law
