= Silverstream Secondary School =

Silverstream Secondary School is a school in the Western Cape.
