= Langa Secondary School =

Aloe Secondary School is a school in the Western Cape.
