= Diocesan College =

Coordinates: 33°57′50″S 18°28′53″E

Diocesan College (Bishops)
- Bishop Diocesan College school crest

Location
- Camp Ground Road, Rondebosch; Cape Town, Western Cape 7700; South Africa

Information
- School type: All-boys private school
- Motto: Pro Fide Et Patria "For Faith and Fatherland"
- Religious affiliation: Christianity
- Denomination: Anglicanism
- Established: 2 October 1849; 176 years ago
- Founder: The Rt Revd Robert Gray, Bishop of Cape Town
- Sister school: St. Cyprian's School, Cape Town
- Headmaster: Mr Antony Reeler
- Exam board: NSC and Cambridge AS/A Levels (recently introduced)
- Chaplain: Father Monwabisi Peter
- Grades: 8–12
- Gender: Male
- Enrollment: 800 boys
- Language: English
- Schedule: 07:45 - 15:15
- Campus: Urban Campus
- Campus type: Suburban
- Houses: Birt; Founders; Gray; Mallett; Ogilvie; School; Kidd; White
- Colours: Blue; Navy; White
- Nickname: Bishops
- Rivals: Paarl Boys' High School; Paul Roos Gymnasium; Rondebosch Boys' High School; South African College Schools; Wynberg Boys' High School
- Newspaper: My Bishops Life
- School fees: R331,000 (boarding & tuition)
- Feeder schools: Bishops Preparatory School; Western Province Preparatory School
- Affiliation: Anglican; HMC; ISASA
- Alumni: Old Diocesans ("ODs")
- Website: www.bishops.org.za

The Diocesan College (commonly known as Bishops) is a private, English medium, boarding and day high school for boys situated in the suburb of Rondebosch in Cape Town in the Western Cape province of South Africa. The school was established on 2 October 1849 by the Anglican Bishop of Cape Town.

== History ==
The college was founded by Robert Gray, the first Anglican bishop of Cape Town. Robert Gray along with his wife Sophy Gray, founded a number of other schools including the sister school, St. Cyprian's School, Cape Town.

The school's scholarship system was proposed by Lewis Michell, a South African banker, who wanted to represent the British culture in the country and create Anglican church schools based on the English public school system. The school's staff were British and came from an Oxbridge background. In 1901, in ill health, Cecil Rhodes was persuaded to establish a scholarship system at the school, where successful graduates could progress to Oxford or Cambridge.

More than 800 old boys from the Diocesan College served in battle during World War I, with 112 killed in action. The school has a roll of honour commemorating those who took service.

== Structure ==
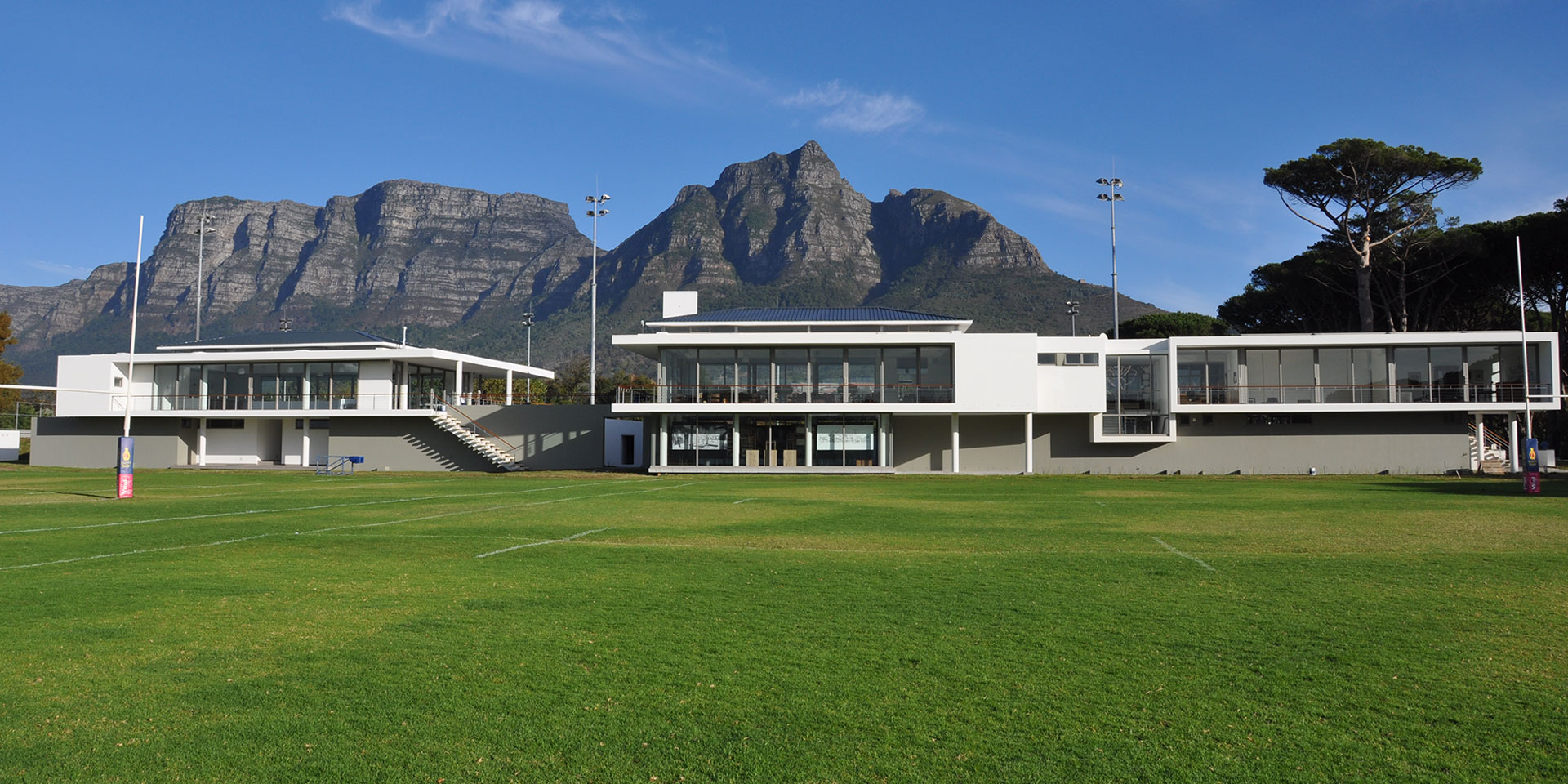
The Woodlands Pavilion, Bishops Museum & Archives, and the Mitre (OD Union Headquarters) viewed from School House facing towards UCT and Table Mountain.

The institution consists of three schools: the college for grades 8–12; the preparatory school for grades 3–7, and the pre-preparatory school for grades N-2. The college is on Campground Road at the main campus, and a small portion of this land is used for the pre-preparatory school. The Preparatory School is situated in Fir Road, Rondebosch close to the college campus.

The college has eight houses: Founders, School and White are the boarding houses, and Birt, Gray, Kidd, Mallett and Ogilvie are for day-scholars. Each house has about 70 to 100 students, and is governed by a house director and two assistant directors. The houses are further broken down into tutor groups of about 15 to 20 boys (three or four boys per grade). Each house is equipped with a common room, kitchen, study room, matric room, quad, dining hall, and offices for the head of house and house directors. The preparatory school has four houses: Van der Bijl, Bramley, Brooke and Charlton (although Van der Bijl and Bramley were originally boarding houses this has been changed in 2020, now all Prep Houses are day boy houses). The institution also has the Old Diocesan Union - also known as the OD Union - which has over 5,000 active members in 28 branches around the world.

Bishops is renowned as one of the top schools in the country for its academics. It has consistently ranked within the top 10 schools in the country for Matric, and as one of the top schools in the Western Cape. It is one of four schools in the world to offer an annual Rhodes Scholarship to an ex-pupil to attend the University of Oxford, having been part of the initial Rhodes Scholarship experiment. The school now shares the scholarship with ex-pupils of Herschel School, St. Cyprian's School, and LEAP Schools.

The original HA Molteno Library (which was initially funded by Harry Anderson Molteno as part of the 125th anniversary of Bishops) was designed by Maciek Miszewski and opened in 1977, before which the library had been housed in the Brooke Chapel. It was renovated in 2013.The Library was decommissioned in 2023 to 2024, and fully renovated to the modern Ubuntu Learning Centre

In 2018, a new trans-disciplinary curriculum was introduced for Grade 9 students called Big Ideas, focusing on sustainability and promoting critical thinking, communication, collaboration, and creativity. The curriculum was based on the framework of the UN Sustainable Development Goals as a way for students to learn about global issues, and culminated in a project undertaken by all students that tackled an aspect of a global issue.

The school enters boys annually into a number of competitions such as the UCT Mathematics Competition and the South African Mathematics Olympiad, and students can qualify for the provincial or national Mathematics teams. The school also participates in the Eskom Science Expo, with students progressing to fairs such as ISEF. Senior boys write the National Science Olympiads, and have achieved top 10 results in the country.

== Culture ==
Music is regularly featured in the school's curriculum. This includes daily chapel services and an annual Eisteddfod, which are designed to stimulate a musical interest in everyone. The John Peake Music School underwent extensive renovations during 2002. It now houses two well-equipped teaching classrooms, five offices for the full-time staff, nine instrumental teaching rooms, a dedicated percussion studio, a staff room, two dedicated practice rooms, the Hyslop Concert Hall, a recording studio, a SoundHouse for music technology and two store rooms.

== Controversies ==
In March 2000, five matric boarders were expelled having been found guilty of beating about twenty Grade 9 and Grade 10 students in a hazing 'raid'. Fourteen months prior two boys were also victims of hazing. The school has publicly committed to eradicating the culture of bullying at the school.

A pupil at the school died in June 2012 after catching viral meningitis.

In 2014, a teacher, Leonard Kaplan, who was accused of inappropriate conduct toward students. He was ultimately asked to resign from the school. One report in the media stated "similar allegations had been made against Kaplan 19 years earlier but he had been allowed to stay on at the school".

In 2019, history teacher and water polo coach Fiona Viotti immediately resigned after her alleged sexual relationship with a matric pupil was exposed. Details later emerged that Viotti slept with 5 boys between 17 and 18 years old with the first incident dating back to 2015, but the investigation by the South African Council for Educators (SACE) was dropped in 2020 after the SACE spokesperson reported that none of the parents of these boys would allow them to speak to the SACE.

== Notable alumni ==
- Stuart Abbott – former England rugby union international
- Raymond Ackerman – businessman
- Selborne Boome – former Springbok rugby player
- Haroon Bhorat – academic and economist
- William Carlsson – first-class cricketer
- Nizaam Carr – first post apartheid Muslim Springbok, Current Wasps player
- Robin Coombs – co-discoverer of the Coombs test
- Ian Donald – physician
- David Eadie – first-class cricketer
- John Fairbairn - naval officer
- Sacha Feinberg-Mngomezulu - Springbok rugby player
- Robbie Fleck – former Springbok rugby player & rugby union coach
- Herschelle Gibbs – former Proteas cricketer
- Johannes de Villiers Graaff – economist and mountaineer
- Edmund Hakewill-Smith - Major General, World War II
- Tony Honoré – lawyer and jurist
- Ed Jordan - musician, songwriter
- Dillyn Leyds – Springbok rugby player
- Francois Louw – Springbok rugby player
- Hal Luscombe - Welsh rugby player
- Chris Mann – author and poet
- John X. Merriman - politician
- Ronald Napier - cricketer and lawyer
- Tim Noakes – scientist & professor
- Gavin Relly – former Anglo-American chairman
- James Roscoe - diplomat
- James Selfe – South African politician
- Mark Shuttleworth – entrepreneur & former astronaut
- Louis Spencer, Viscount Althorp – heir apparent to the Spencer earldom
- Julian Ogilvie Thompson – former De Beers and Anglo American chairman
- Anthony van Ryneveld – first-class cricketer and rugby player
- Dan Vickerman – former Wallabies rugby player
- John Wiley – cricketer and politician

== Notes and references ==
- Gardener, John (1997). Bishops 150: a history of the Diocesan College, Rondebosch. Juta. ISBN 978-0-7021-4539-1.
- Hermitage Day, E. (1930). "Robert Gray: First Bishop of Cape Town". London: SPCK.
- McIntyre, Donald (1950). A Century of 'Bishops'. Juta.
