= Isilimela Secondary School =

Isilimela Secondary School is a school in the Western Cape.
