= Mountview Secondary School =

High school in South Africa

Coordinates: 33°59′24″S 18°31′29″E

- Verulam, KwaZulu-Natal; South Africa

Information
- Established: 1976; 50 years ago
- Enrollment: c.1156
- Website: forty3fortymarketi.wixsite.com/mountviewsecondary

Mountview Secondary School is a school in the KwaZulu-Natal. It was opened in 1976. The school was built in response to the need for a further secondary school in Verulam. As of 2026, enrollment is 1,156.
