= Heideveld Secondary School =

Heideveld Senior Secondary

Location
- Waterburg Road, Heideveld, Cape Town, Western Cape; South Africa; 33.9626°S 18.5605°E

Information
- Type: High School
- Motto: Semper Paratus
- Established: July 1978
- School district: Athlone, Cape Town
- Faculty: 39
- Grades: 8–12
- Enrollment: 1,180
- Colour: Navy Blue
- Website: heideveldhigh.co.za

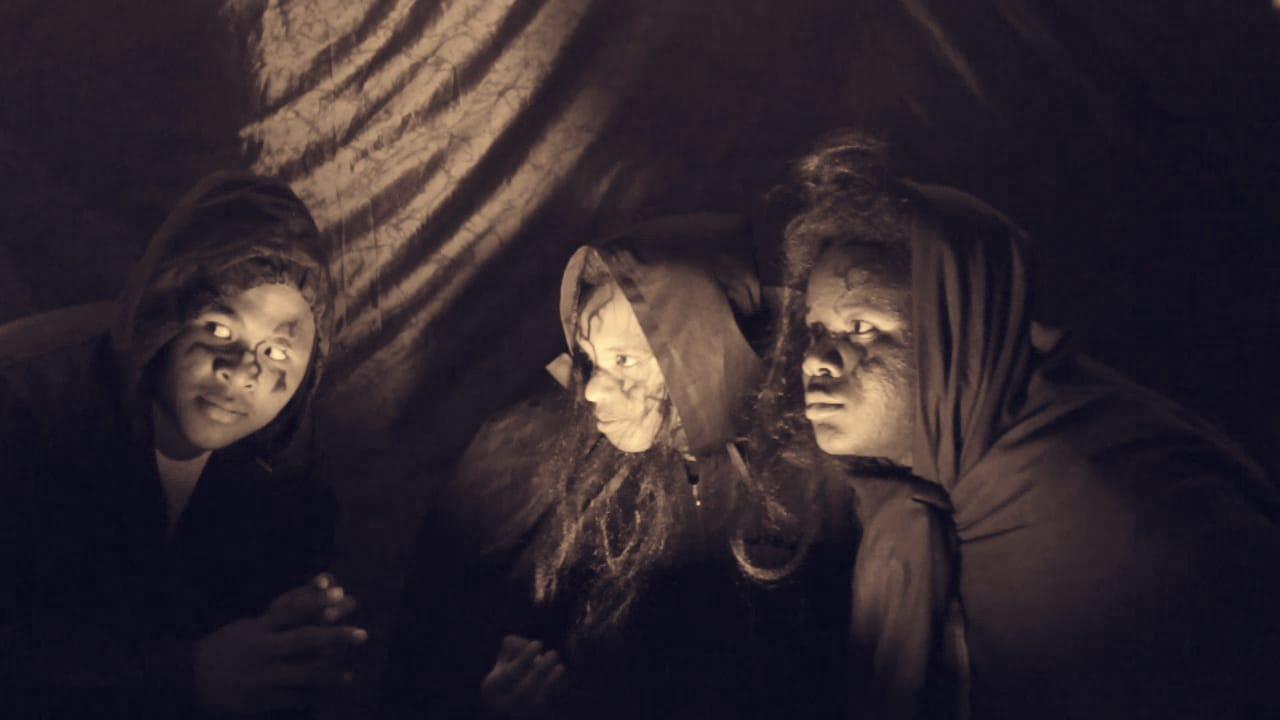
Learners at Heideveld portraying a scene from Macbeth

Heideveld Secondary School is an educational institution located in Heideveld, Cape Town, Western Cape, South Africa. Situated adjacent to a major city thoroughfare and railway tracks, it is recognized for its prominent location. It ranks among the early adopters of E-learning initiatives in the Western Cape region.

== Background ==
Its students range from the academically achieved and physically gifted to those with more difficulty learning. The school provides a standard government based curriculum issued by Western Cape government for learners to be assessed on. Subjects offered are from the extended grades system of the GET phase and has the FET phases for the senior learners.

Provided subjects in the institution are:

- Mathematics and mathematics literacy
- Physics
- Life sciences
- Languages: English, Afrikaans, and Xhosa
- Engineering graphics and design
- Geography
- History
- Accounting
- Economics
- Consumer studies
- Business studies
- Life Orientation

The school also has GET based subjects like EMS and technology for grades 8 and 9.
