= Windermere Secondary School (Cape Town) =

Coordinates: 33.907°S 18.516°E

Windermere Secondary School is a school in Windermere, Cape Town, Western Cape, South Africa.
