= Pelican Park High School =

School in South Africa

Coordinates: 34.04770°S 18.52268°E

Pelican Park High School is a public school owned by the Western Cape Education Department. The current principal is Mrs Clark.
