= Thandokhulu Secondary School =

Coordinates: 33°56′44″S 18°28′16″E

Thandokhulu Secondary School is a school in Mowbray in the Western Cape.
