= Pinelands High School =

Location
- 94 Forest Drive; Pinelands; Cape Town 7405; South Africa; 33.937°S 18.508°E

Information
- School type: Public
- Motto: Excellence, Leadership, Innovation
- Opened: July 1952
- Authority: Western Cape Education Department
- Principal: Graham Sayer (as of 2024)
- Teaching staff: approx. 70
- Grades: 8–12
- Gender: Boys & Girls
- Age: 14 to 18
- Enrollment: approx. 980
- Language: English
- Colours: Blue; White
- Website: www.phs.org.za

Pinelands High School is a public English medium co-educational high school situated in Forest Drive, Pinelands in the city of Cape Town in the Western Cape province of South Africa. It was opened in July 1952 and the founding principal was Jack Kent. The school now enrolls approximately 980 students.

In 2004, the school provided filming locations for the motion picture Ask the Dust, with the sets built to simulate Los Angeles in the 1930s.

== Academics ==
Grades 8 – 9

English Home Language, Afrikaans or isiXhosa First Additional Language, Mathematics, Creative Arts (Art, Music and Drama), Economic Management Sciences, Life Orientation, Natural Sciences, Social Sciences and Technology.

Grades 10 – 12

Compulsory: English Home Language, Afrikaans or isiXhosa First Additional Language, Mathematics or Mathematical Literacy and Life Orientation.

Elective (minimum of three): Accounting, Computer Applications Technology, Consumer Studies, Design (Surface and Textiles), Dramatic Arts, Engineering Graphics and Design, Geography, History, Information Technology, Life Sciences, Music, Physical Sciences, Tourism and Visual Arts.

Academic Extension Subjects (optional): Advanced Programme English, Advanced Programme Mathematics and IT.

== Notable alumni ==
- Lesley-Ann Brandt, actress
- Tim Harrell, professional baseball pitcher who represented South Africa at the 2000 Summer Olympics
- Craig Matthews, South African cricket player
- Austin Smith, captain of the South African men's hockey team at the 2012 Summer Olympics in London

== Controversy ==
On the morning of 26 July 2024, Pinelands High School was notified of a video circulating on social media. The video showed a group of coloured Grade 8 learners "auctioning" off black Grade 8 learners who were forced into a bicycle cage on the Pinelands campus. The "auctioneer" would place the starting bid and then the students outside of the cage would offer their biddings, reminiscent of the slave trade. The video was captioned "Slavery at schools is crazy".

According to a mother of a student who was nearly a victim, the coloured students grabbed her son in an attempt to force him into the cage. However, the child managed to escape. The mother also claimed to have brought previous acts of racist bullying against her son to the school's attention (such as being called a "n****rbob" and being told to "go and eat chicken feet", among other things) but the school had not attempted to deal with it.

The spokesperson for the Western Cape Education Department (WCED), Bronagh Hammond, stated that "The department is aware of the deeply disturbing and hurtful video that is circulating."

The school addressed its staff and students, stating that they are launching an investigation into the situation. As of 28 July 2024, the school has made no official statement to the press.

...
