= Spine Road High School =

Location
- Corner of Spine and Zenith Roads, Rocklands, Mitchell's Plain; Cape Town; South Africa
- Coordinates: 34.0607°S 18.6205°E

Information
- Status: Open
- Principal: Mr Fairbairn
- Website: spineroadhighschool.co.za

Spine Road High School is a school in Rocklands, Mitchell's Plain, a township in Cape Town, South Africa.

== History ==
At the end of the 2014, it became the first school in Mitchell's Plain to achieve a 100% matric pass rate.
