= Vista High School (Cape Town) =

High school in Cape Town, South Africa

Coordinates: 33.9236°S 18.4100°E

Vista High School is a school in Cape Town, Western Cape, South Africa.
