= Spes Bona High School =

School in Cape Town, South Africa

Coordinates: 33.9582°S 18.5081°E

Spes Bona High School is a school in Cape Town, Western Cape, South Africa. It has no more than 200 students as of 2019.
