= Stellenbosch High School =

Coordinates: 33.931°S 18.8802°E

Hoërskool Stellenbosch
- Hoërskool Stellenbosch school crest

Location
- Jannasch Street; Stellenbosch, Western Cape; South Africa

Information
- Type: Public & Boarding
- Motto: SEMPER ALTIOR (ALWAYS HIGHER)
- Religious affiliation: Christianity
- Established: 1978; 48 years ago
- Principal: Mr T. H. Pellissier
- Teaching staff: 35
- Grades: 8–12
- Gender: Boys & Girls
- Age: 14 to 18
- Enrollment: 700 pupils
- Language: Afrikaans
- Schedule: 07:40 - 14:20
- Campus: Urban Campus
- Colours: Red; Black; White
- Nickname: Stellies
- Accreditation: Western Cape Education Department
- Magazine: Stelloskoop
- Website: http://www.stellies.com/

Hoërskool Stellenbosch is a public Afrikaans medium co-educational in the town of Stellenbosch, Western Cape, South Africa. It was founded in 1978 as a business-oriented technical school (Hoërhandelskool Stellenbosch), located in the center of town, but moved to the suburbs in the 1980s. It was reserved for white students during Apartheid, but was opened to all races in 1992.

== Location ==
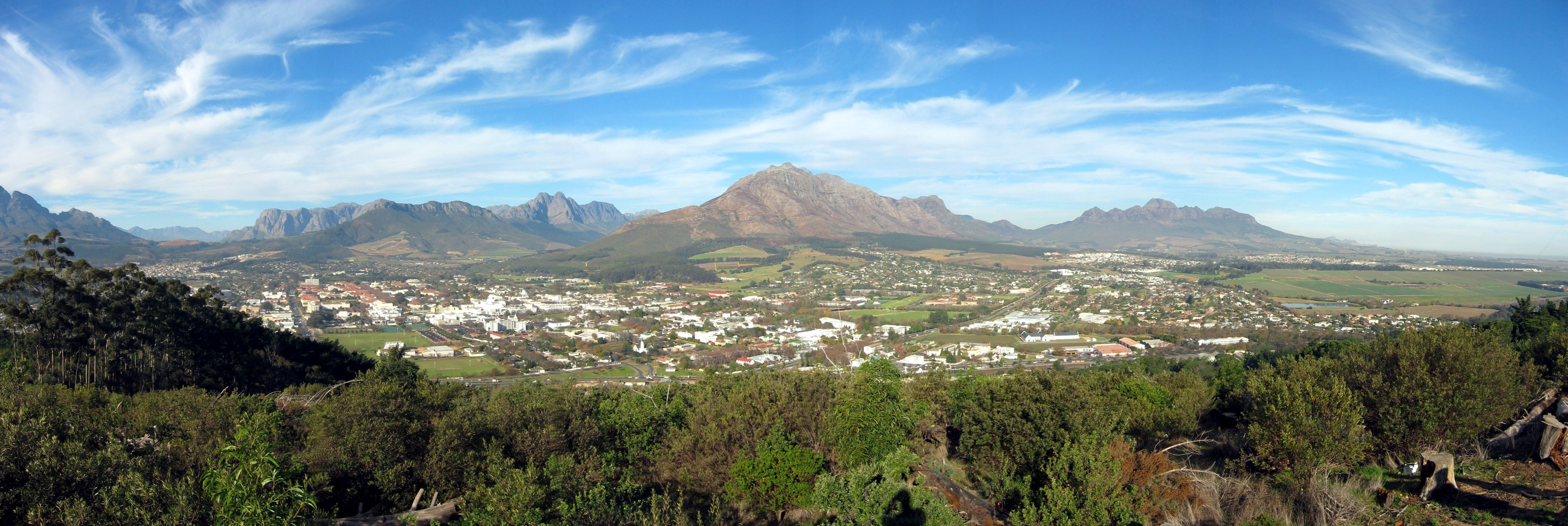
A panorama of Stellenbosch, as seen from Papegaaiberg

Stellenbosch is a town in the Western Cape province of South Africa, situated about 50 kilometres (31 mi) east of Cape Town, along the banks of the Eerste Rivier. It is the second oldest European settlement in the province, after Cape Town. The town became known as the City of Oaks or Eikestad in Afrikaans and Dutch due to the large number of oak trees that were planted by its founder, Simon van der Stel, to grace the streets and homesteads.

The town is home to the University of Stellenbosch and other schools such as Paul Roos Gymnasium, Rhenish Girls' High School and Bloemhof High School. Stellenbosch High School is located between the JS Marais Park and the residential area Uniepark.

== Meaning of school emblem ==
1. The three castles from Simon van der Stel's family crest represents the stronghold that the school offers its learners.
2. The acorn and oak leaf, both symbols of Stellenbosch, symbolise the growth of the learners in the school. It is in gold because their education is precious to them.
3. The result of a learner's education is the certificate with which the school equip them for a bright future, which is why it is placed prominently in the middle.

== School anthem ==
The English version of the school anthem, which is not used any more, was written in April 1978 by JF Spies. HP van der Westhuizen put the lyrics to music in 1977.

The current school anthem is written in Afrikaans. The lyrics are as follows.

Stellenbos ń skone tuiste, en die luister van jou naam
Anker ons aan jou verlede, bind ons tot ń eenheid saam
Vier en hoog net soos die eike
groei ons hier op goeie grond
Met oog gelowig boëntoe
toegerus en afgerond
Semper Altior
Ons lese spoor ons teen die opdraand aan
Vastrap! Moedhou! Altyd hoër!
Tot ons op die bergspits staan

== Academics ==
Learners from Stellenbosch High School write the NSC (National Senior Certificate) examination at the end of their matric year (grade 12). Grade 8–9 learners have the following compulsory subjects:

- Arts and Culture
- Economic and Management Sciences
- English Home Language or English First Additional Language
- Afrikaans Home Language
- Life Orientation
- Mathematics
- Natural Sciences
- Social Sciences
- Technology

In grade 10 learners have four compulsory subjects:

- Afrikaans Home Language
- English Home Language or English First Additional Language
- Mathematics or Mathematical Literacy
- Life Orientation

Further more they can choose 3 or more of the following subjects:

NSC Subjects to choose from:
Computer Applications Technology
Dance Studies
Design
Dramatic Arts
Economics
Engineering Graphics and Design
French Second Additional Language
Geography
German Second Additional Language
History
Hospitality Studies
Information Technology
Life Sciences
Music
Physical Sciences
Tourism
Visual Arts

== Notable alumni ==
- Nicole Holm (South African actress known for her role in the TV series Known Gods)
- Pieter Schoeman (Leader of the London Philharmonic Orchestra)
- Megan-Geoffrey Prins (winner of the Slurpie-Kanna award for best upcoming artist and a soloist in the University of Stellenbosch's symphony orchestra)
- Anjulie de Vos (renowned South African cellist)
- Stefan Temmingh (international Recorder player currently living in Germany)
