= Montebello Design Centre =

Non-profit art space in Cape Town, South Africa

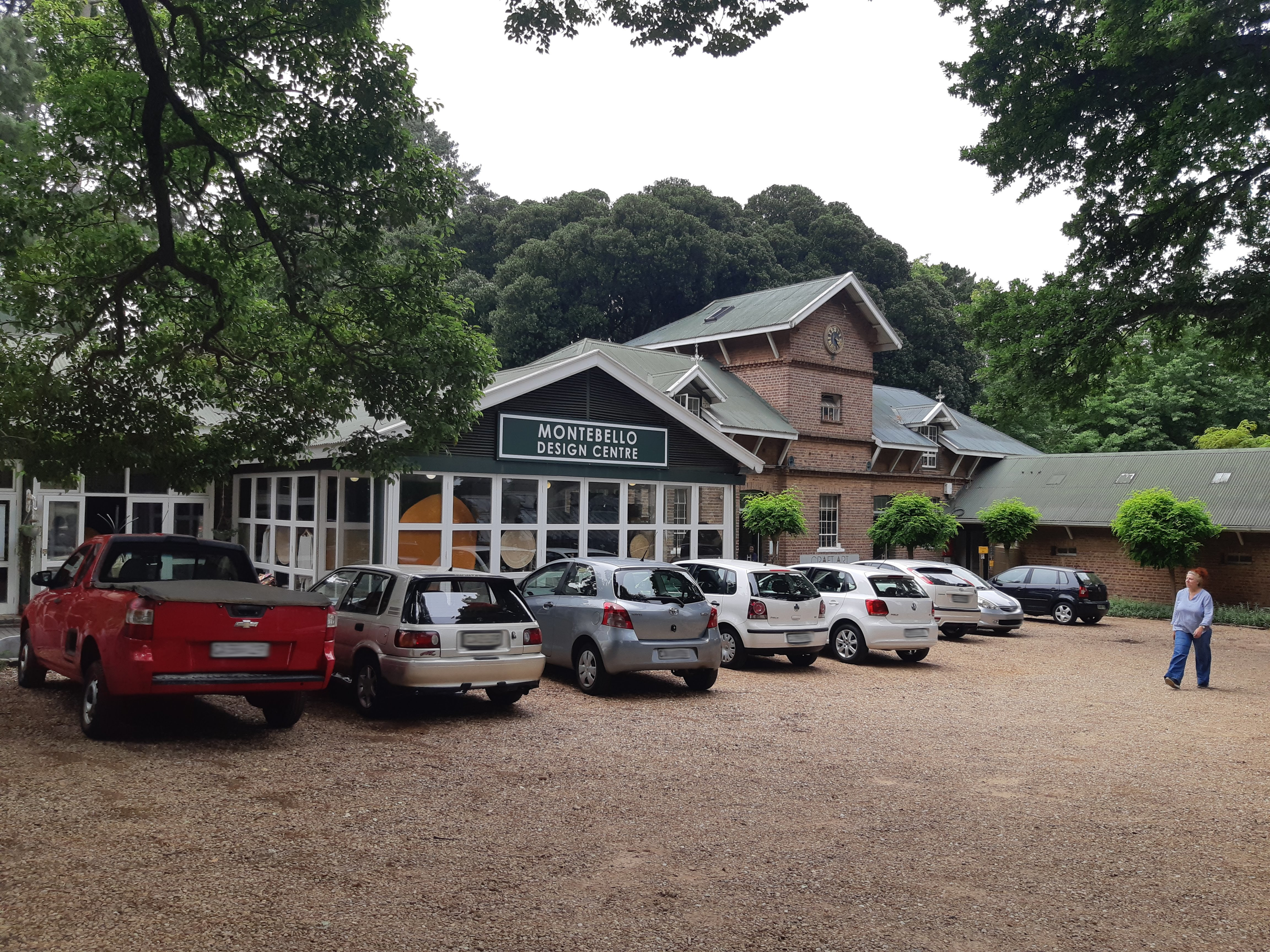
- The gift shop, clock tower and old stable area of the Montebello Design Centre
- Interactive map of Montebello Design Centre
- Location: 31 Newlands Ave, Newlands, Cape Town, 7700
- Coordinates: 33°58′13″S 18°27′26″E
- Type: Art, craft and business space
- Events: Art exhibitions, craft centre, community events

Construction
- Opened: 1993; 33 years ago

Website
- www.montebello.co.za

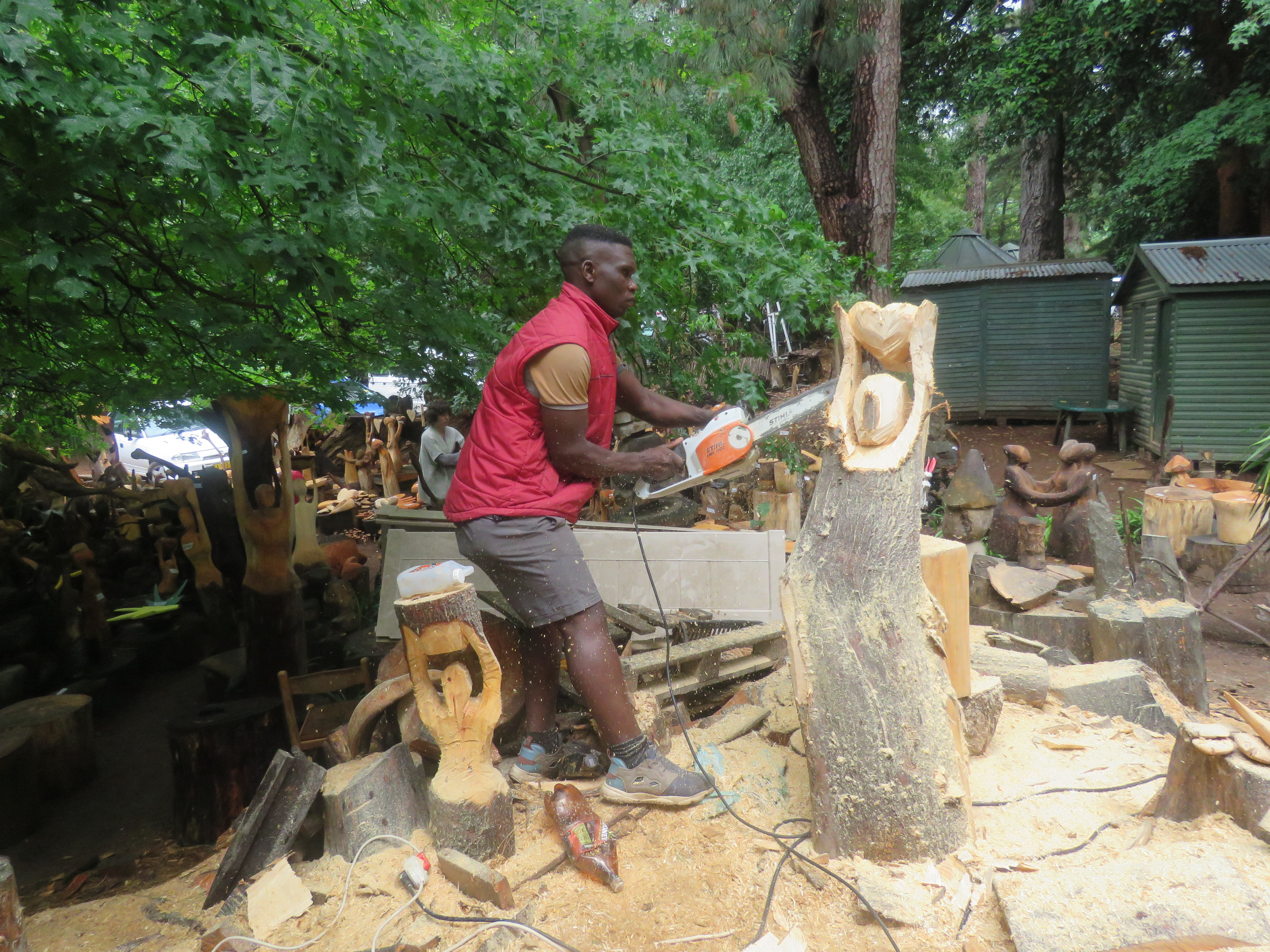
Artist Right Mukore of Zimbabwe located at the Montebello Design Centre sculpting a tree trunk using an electric saw.

The Montebello Design Centre is a non-profit art and craft space established in 1993 and located in Newlands, Cape Town, South Africa. The centre hosts over twenty craft workshops, shops, restaurants, and artist studios.

== History ==
Situated beneath Devil's Peak, the design centre stands in what was once a substantial tract of woods. Described on 6 May 1652 as a, "fine, large forest of very tall, straight growing trees" these lands were the hunting and grazing grounds of the Khoisan Cochoqua people. Remnants of these original forests can still be seen on the lower slopes of the mountain. The Dutch East India Company established the brewer Ruttgert Menssink on the site in 1696.

By the late 19th century the area was an outlying suburb of Cape Town. After the break-up of the original Pappenboom Estate, Daniel Cloete, owner of the Newlands Brewery, purchased a section of the Pappenboom estates and built a mansion. This existing homestead later became the South African College School's Michaelis House. The adjacent face brick stables currently housing the Montebello Design Centre were built in about 1880. The complex is considered one of the finest of its period in South Africa.

Cape Town brewer Anders Ohlsson purchased the estate from Cloete in 1888 and named it Montebello. Ohlsson, who established Ohlsson's Brewery on the site sometime after 1881.

Montebello sits on the site of the brewery's stables which housed the horses that helped support the brewery's logistical operations. The site was sold to the randlord Max Michaelis in 1919 when automotives started replacing horse-drawn wagons. His son, the artist Cecil Michaelis, first experimented with South African clays and kaolin in the late 1940s.

== Design centre ==
Prior to returning to South Africa, Cecil Michaelis' 1935 founding of Rycotewood College for the arts and skilled associated trades in Oxfordshire, United Kingdom, had convinced him an equivalent institution sited at Montebello would succeed in a country where much creative expression was still seen as derivative. First mooted in the 1950s, this ideal would take over thirty years to be realised.

Following the expropriation of the main house and estate from the Michaelis family to house South African College Schools the remaining stables were donated to University of Cape Town in 1988 on condition that a craft and design centre would be established on it. A further financial bequest by Cecil Michaelis allowed for the establishment of the Montebello Design Centre in 1993.

== Notable residencies ==
- John Bauer, potter.
- David Krut, art publisher and dealer.
