= Grovepoint Capital =

British private equity firm

- Industry: Private equity
- Founded: 2010
- Founder: Leon Blitz; Bradley Fried
- Headquarters: London, NW1; United Kingdom
- Website: grovepoint.co.uk

Grovepoint Capital is a private equity firm headquartered in London, United Kingdom. It has additional offices in Israel. It was co-founded by Leon Blitz and Bradley Fried in 2010.

In 2013, it acquired a majority stake in Algatechnologies, an Israeli biotech start-up, at a value of $50 million. In 2014 it acquired a majority stake in the sports nutrition company Grenade at a valuation of £35 million; in 2017 Lion Capital acquired a majority stake in the business from Grovepoint valued at £72 million. In 2015 it bought Payzone UK from Duke Street.

The firm has provided credit including a €25 million debt package to German retailer NKD and a £19 million funding line to the British caravan holiday company Pure Leisure Group. In 2018 the credit arm of the business was renamed from Grovepoint Credit to Bantry Bay Capital.
