= Sans Souci Girls' High School =

Coordinates: 33.9761°S 18.4625°E

Location
- 4 Esme Road, Newlands; Cape Town, Western Cape; South Africa

Information
- School type: All-girls public school
- Motto: Disce Prodesse (Learn To be of Service)
- Religious affiliation: Christianity
- Established: 21 October 1961; 64 years ago
- Sister school: South African College Schools
- School district: District 5
- School number: 021 671 7188
- Headmistress: Deirdre Chandler
- Grades: 8–12
- Gender: Female
- Age: 14 to 18
- Enrollment: 520 girls
- Language: English
- Schedule: 08:00 - 15:00
- Campus: Urban Campus
- Campus type: Suburban
- Colours: Blue; Light Blue; Red
- Nickname: Sans Souci
- Rivals: Herschel Girls School; Rustenburg Girls' High School; Wynberg Girls' High School
- Accreditation: Western Cape Education Department
- Newspaper: Tatler
- School fees: R45,364.00 (tuition)
- Alumni: Old Girls
- Website: www.sanssouci.co.za

Sans Souci Girls' High School is a Public English medium high school for girls situated in the suburb of Newlands in Cape Town in the Western Cape province of South Africa. The school was established in 1960 and was decreed by the apartheid-era South African government as whites only school. In 1991 the school opened enrollment to all races as a model B school.

== Staff ==
List of headmistresses at Sans Souci Girls' High School.

- Joan Kenyon (1960–1978)
- Fiona Watson (1978–1997)
- Elizabeth Fugard (1997–1999)
- Charmaine Murray (1999–2017)
- Ruschida O'Shea (2017–2021)
- Deirdre Chandler (2025– current)

One of the school's former teachers, Denise Frick, is a South African chess master and winner of the 2015 South African Woman's Closed Chess Championships.

== Sport ==
- Archery
- Athletics
- Chess
- Cricket
- Cross country
- Cycling
- Diving
- Equestrian
- Hockey
- Netball
- Rowing
- Squash
- Swimming
- Table tennis
- Tennis
- Water polo

== Controversy ==
In 2016 the school's hair and language policies caused controversy resulting in a broader national discussion of exclusionary or discriminatory school policies and an investigation by the Western Cape Education Department.

In 2019 a teacher at the school was filmed slapping a student. The incident resulted in an Equity Court case against the teacher that was ultimately withdrawn.
