= Westerford High School =

Public secondary school in Cape Town, Western Cape, South Africa

- Westerford High School crest

Location
- 220 Mount Road, Rondebosch, Newlands; Cape Town, Western Cape; South Africa; 33°58′9″S 18°27′54″E

Information
- School type: Public
- Motto: Nil Nisi Optimum (Nothing But Your Best)
- Established: 21 January 1953; 73 years ago
- Headmaster: Mark Smith
- Staff: 108
- Grades: 8–12
- Gender: Boys & Girls
- Age: 14 to 18
- Enrollment: 900 pupils
- Language: English
- Schedule: 08:00 - 15:00
- Campus type: Suburban
- Houses: Buffalo; Indlovu; Luiperd; Simba; Tshukulu
- Colours: Gold; Maroon; Blue
- Song: The Westerford School Song
- Nickname: WHS
- Alumni: Old Westerfordian Association
- Website: www.westerford.co.za

Westerford High School is a public English medium co-educational high school situated in the suburbs of Rondebosch and Newlands in Cape Town in the Western Cape province of South Africa.

It has a campus in Rondebosch where the main school buildings are located and a secondary campus in Newlands used for sport. The school is located close to the Newlands Rugby Ground and Table Mountain. The school opened on 21 January 1953 and celebrated its Diamond Jubilee on 7 March 2013.

Westerford enjoys a prominent position in the local community, hosting visits from key figures within South Africa such as the then President of South Africa, Nelson Mandela and guest speakers such as former Minister of Education Kader Asmal and political cartoonist Jonathan Shapiro.

In 2009, Westerford High School was ranked by the Sunday Times newspaper as the top state school in South Africa and one of the largest feeder schools for the University of Cape Town.

== History ==
View of a sports field looking towards Table Mountain

Westerford opened at the beginning of January 1954, housed in an old homestead which no longer exists. The site was originally known as Westervoort (Afrikaans for "continue West"), but the school was known as Claremont Secondary School from the name of the school which shared a property with a small primary school on Dean Street. The pupils from Claremont Secondary school had transferred their desks to the new property at the end of 1952.

Noel Taylor, the first headmaster, began referring to the institution as Westerford Secondary School and in 1953 the Cape School Board recognised the name. In 1956 when the first pupils matriculated the school became Westerford College Schools.

The institution enjoyed rapid growth from 29 pupils to 34 in its first year and grew further until 1959 when a new hall, named for the first headmaster, was opened as part of new school buildings for the 504 pupils and 27 staff members employed.

== Campus ==
The institution is currently based on the same site as the original homestead, although no trace of the homestead remains. The school now has extensive facilities for use by the students, including a dedicated sports centre and AstroTurf.

== Students ==
The school has approximately 900 pupils in 5 grades ranging from ages 14 to 18. There are roughly equal numbers of girls and boys in classes kept ideally below 30 learners.

A Westerford Matric pupil was placed 12th in the Senior Certificate Examination results for 2005. The school also received a book voucher award in the Senior Certificate Awards for 2005 for achieving excellent academic results. The school was placed in the top 10 schools in the Western Cape with a 100% pass rate, 47% distinction and 96% matriculation endorsement rate. In July 2006 a Westerfordian won the national English Olympiad.

In the final results in 2006 the school was again in the top 10 with a 100% pass rate, 46% distinction and 98% endorsement rate. In 2007 again the pass rate was 100%, the distinction rate 43% and endorsement rate 97%.

== Notable alumni ==
- John Bauer, South African potter
- Farhaan Behardien, cricketer
- Dan Corder, media personality
- Sir Bradley Fried, businessman
- Nik Rabinowitz, comedian and author
- Alan Committie, comedian, actor and educator
- Brendan Young, cricketer
- Thuthukile Zuma, former Chief of Staff for the Department of Telecommunications and Postal Services
