= Wynberg Girls' High School =

All-girls private school in Cape Town, South Africa

- Wynberg Girls' High School crest

Location
- Aliwal Road, Wynberg; Cape Town, Western Cape; South Africa; 34°0′10″S 18°27′50″E

Information
- School type: All-girls public school
- Motto: Honour before Honours
- Established: 12 July 1886; 140 years ago
- Sister school: Wynberg Boys' High School
- School district: District 9
- School number: 021 764 2200
- Headmistress: Jennifer Wallace
- Grades: 8–12
- Gender: Female
- Age: 14 to 18
- Enrollment: 926 girls
- Language: English
- Schedule: 07:50 - 15:00
- Campus: Urban Campus
- Campus type: Suburban
- Houses: Amaqua; Aristea; Azima; Ferraria; iKhala; Jackalberry; Marula; Mowana
- Colours: Brown; Gold; White
- Rivals: Herschel Girls' School; Rustenburg Girls' High School; Sans Souci Girls' High School
- Accreditation: Western Cape Education Department
- Newspaper: Wynpress
- School fees: R60,000 (boarding); R30,000 (tuition)
- Alumni: Old Girls
- Website: www.wynghs.co.za

Wynberg Girls' High School is a public high school for girls situated in Wynberg, Cape Town in the Western Cape province of South Africa.

Founded in 1886, Wynberg Girls' High School is one of the oldest all-girls schools in South Africa. The first headmistress, Miss Margaret Stewart, was supported by two teachers and catered to 27 pupils. Initially a co-educational school, WGHS soon became an all-girls school and was known as Ladies' Seminary.

WGHS is part of the Wynberg Campus of schools, along with Wynberg Girls' Junior School, Wynberg Boys' Junior School, and Wynberg Boys' High School. The school is located in Aliwal Road in the suburb of Wynberg.

== History ==
=== 1895-1908 ===
In September 1884 the Kerkraad of the Dutch Reformed Church, situated on the top of Carr Hill, decided to found a school for girls in Wynberg. Wynberg at this time was a little village on the wagon road from Cape Town. It was situated near the military camp and surrounded by Little Chelsea with its cottages and narrow winding streets.

The minister of the Dutch Reformed Church at that time lived in the old Pastorie where the boarding house is situated today. The church council decided to build a little school building (where the school library is today) and named the school "Ladies' Seminary" - it was soon nicknamed the "School in the Bush."

The school was officially opened in 1885 with two teachers - Misses Annie and Nellie Brink - and twenty-seven young boys and girls. The first principal was Miss Margaret Stewart (1885-1890) The school motto was chosen in 1890 - and the phrase "Honour before Honours" means "Personal integrity and character are more important than winning prizes and awards." The first Standard Ten class matriculated in 1892, and until 1936, the school included pupils from Sub A to Standard Ten. The Cape Education department took over the running of the school in 1905.

The first hostel was built in 1885, and was situated where the main hall is today. The new school was built in 1900, and had dormitories upstairs. The room now used as a staff workroom and offices for HODs used to be a dormitory. Lab One was the kitchen, and the library was the dining room. The school at this time was called Girls' Public School. During this time Physical Education and Sport were introduced into the school. Wynberg introduced Physical Education and employed a qualified Physical Education teacher, Mrs Dolly Rees (who had studied in London). A gymnasium was erected in 1900, and a hockey field was laid out where the Wellington Quad is today. Activities practiced at the school were hockey, cricket and tennis.

=== 1909-1914 ===
The first school hall was built during Miss A Chambers' time as principal. It is now the Ballet Hall.

=== Miss King, 1914-1936 ===
Under the leadership of Miss King, a new building for the Junior School was built. The Peninsula Girls' Schools Games Union was formed and Inter-schools events became a feature of school life. Prefect and House systems were introduced and the school magazine was revived, and has been published every year since 1916.

=== Miss Hawkins ===
In 1936, the Junior School became a separate school. School colours of the time were navy and blue, until Miss Hawkins changed these back to the original colours of brown and gold.

The school is built on part of the Waterloo Estate, originally owned by Captain William Underwood. He had fought under the Duke of Wellington at the Battle of Waterloo before coming to live in Wynberg. In 1938, a new hostel was built and Miss Hawkins named it Waterloo House, and asked the 5th Duke of Wellington if she could use an adapted version of his coat of arms as the new school badge. A new gymnasium was built, and opened in 1944, after the old building had suffered storm damage.

== Sport ==
The sports that are offered in the school are:

- Athletics
- Chess
- Cross country
- Diving
- Touch rugby
- Hockey
- Netball
- E-sports
- Soccer
- Squash
- Swimming
- Table tennis
- Tennis
- Water polo

== Notable alumni ==
- Natalie Du Toit, swimmer
- Ingrid Jonker, poet
- Kirstin Lewis, archer, 1996, 2000 and 2004 Summer Olympics
- Claire-Louise Leyland, British politician
- Alison Munro, British civil servant and headmistress of St Paul's Girls' School (London)
