= Cecil Michaelis =

South African painter (1913–1997)

- Born: Maximilian Gustav Alfred Cecil Michaelis; 19 August 1913; Cabourg, France
- Died: 3 May 1997 (aged 83); Aix-en-Provence, France
- Education: Ruskin School of Drawing and Fine Art
- Known for: Ceramic art, painting

Maximilian Gustav Alfred Cecil Michaelis (born: 19 August 1913 - died: 3 May 1997), was an artist who also practised in glass and ceramics, and a philanthropist who encouraged crafts and design. He was the only son of Sir Max Michaelis, a South African randlord.

== Early life and education ==
Cecil Michaelis was born in Cabourg, France, in 1913, the son of Sir Max Michaelis, a British citizen of German-Jewish extraction who was a self-made Randlord in South Africa, and Lady Lillian Elizabeth Michaelis (?-1969, London). He studied at the Ruskin School of Drawing and Fine Art in Oxford, and then moved to Paris where he studied under Henri Dimier and Othon Friesz, and was advised by Georges Rouault and André Derain. Cecil Michaelis was a member of the Iliazd-Club from 1990 until his death

== Career ==
Although his family wealth precluded a formal career, Michaelis worked tirelessly at his art, drawing and sculpture whilst dividing his time between France, South Africa and Great Britain. In 1935 Sir Max Michaelis purchased Rycote Park near Thame in Oxfordshire, for Cecil's use while he was studying at the Ruskin School of Drawing and Fine Art in Oxford. It remained one of his residences until his death.

=== Teapots ===
One of Michaelis' specialities was making teapots, most especially with anti-drip spouts. Whilst serving in the British Army in Sicily he was renowned for both making and teaching the manufacture of teapots.

=== Exhibitions ===
His work was exhibited widely from 1940 to 1980 in Paris, New York and London.

== Rycotewood College ==
In the late 1930s his philanthropy established Rycotewood College in the nearby town of Thame as a school dedicated to developing skilled craftsmen. In 2003 it merged with Oxford City College and the Rycote Furniture Centre courses were moved to Oxpens road.

== Montebello Design Centre ==
In 1988 he donated part of his Cape Town estate in Newlands to the University of Cape Town so as to set up the Montebello Design Center.
