= Newlands, Cape Town =

Newlands Nuweland
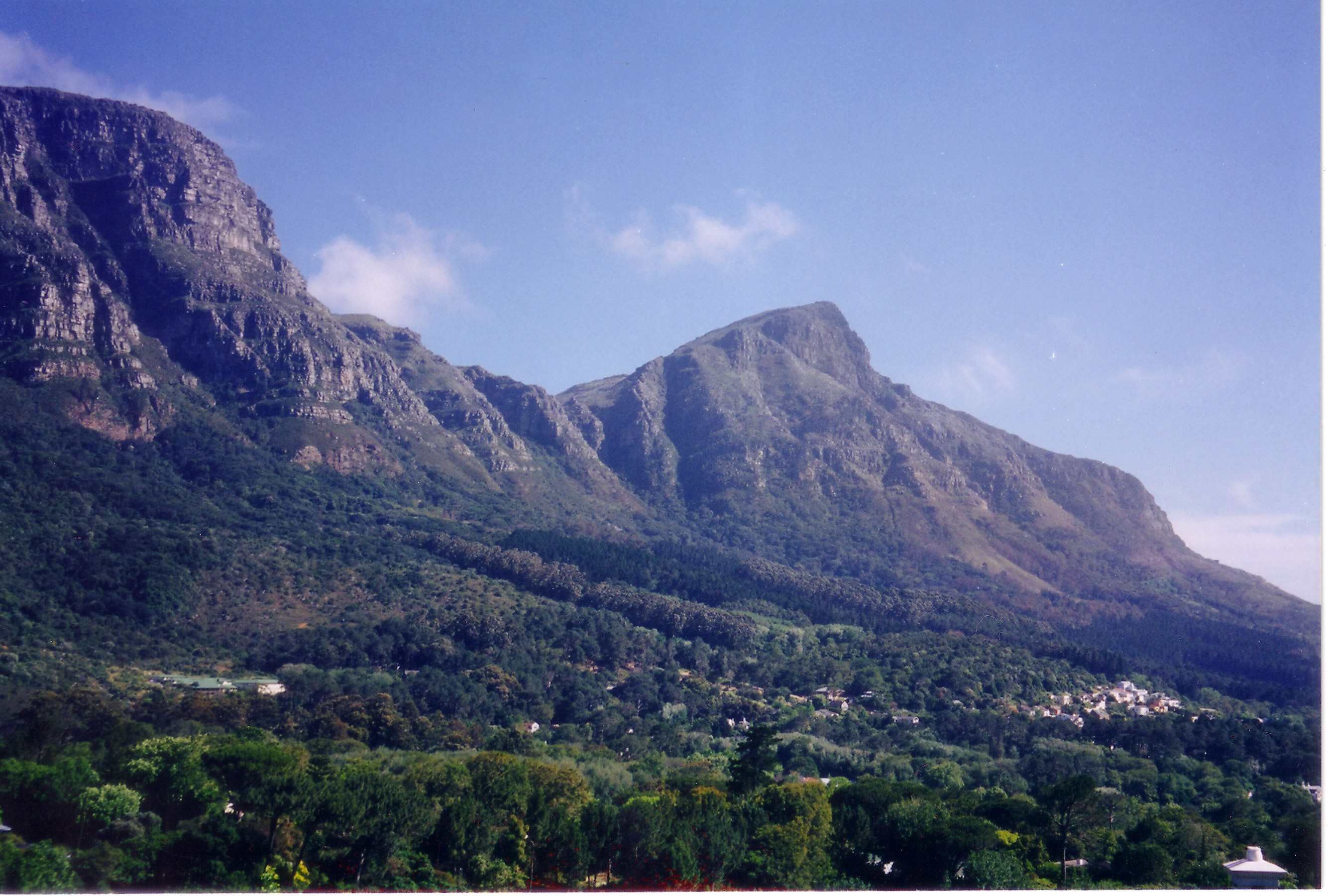
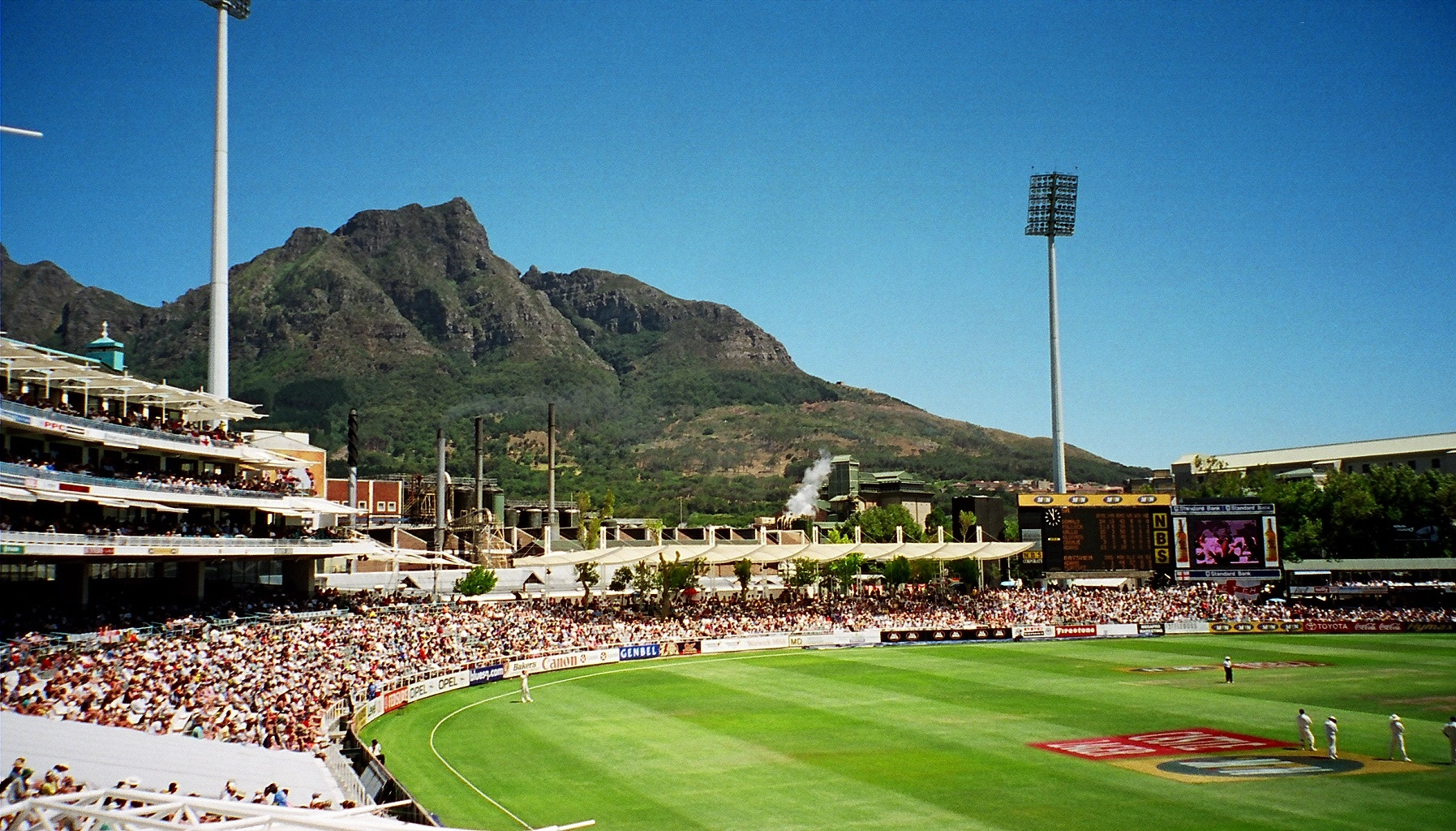
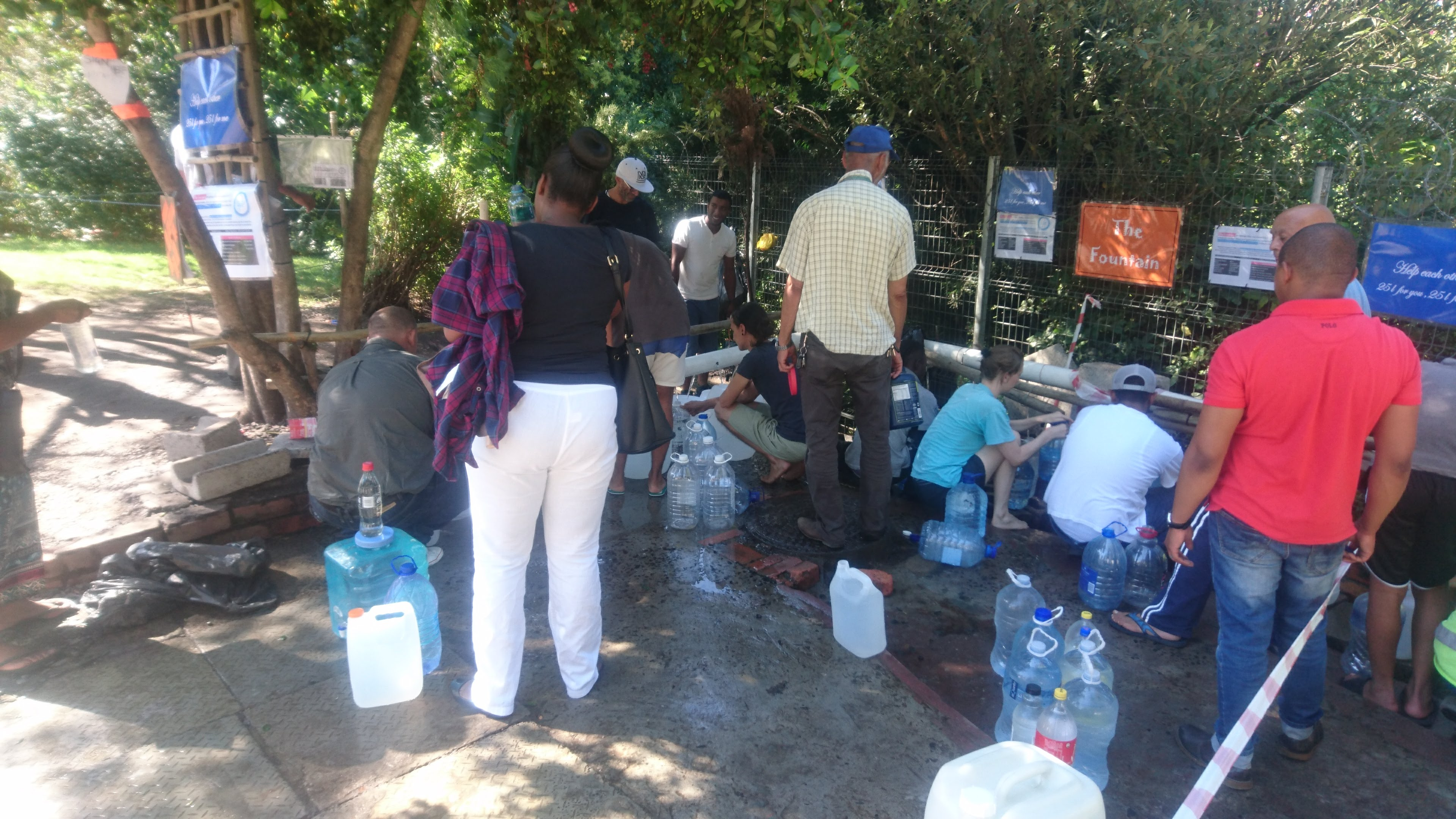
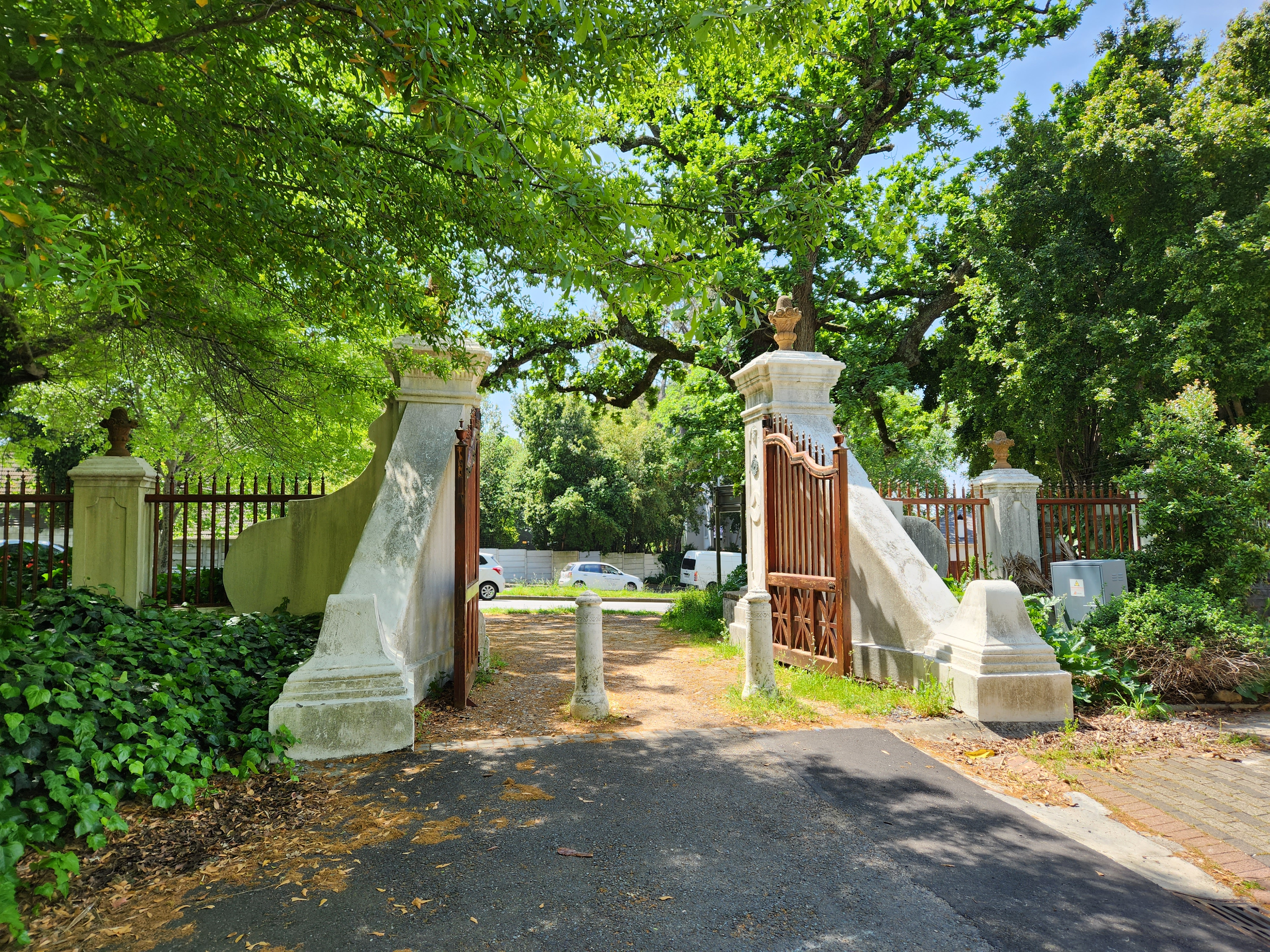
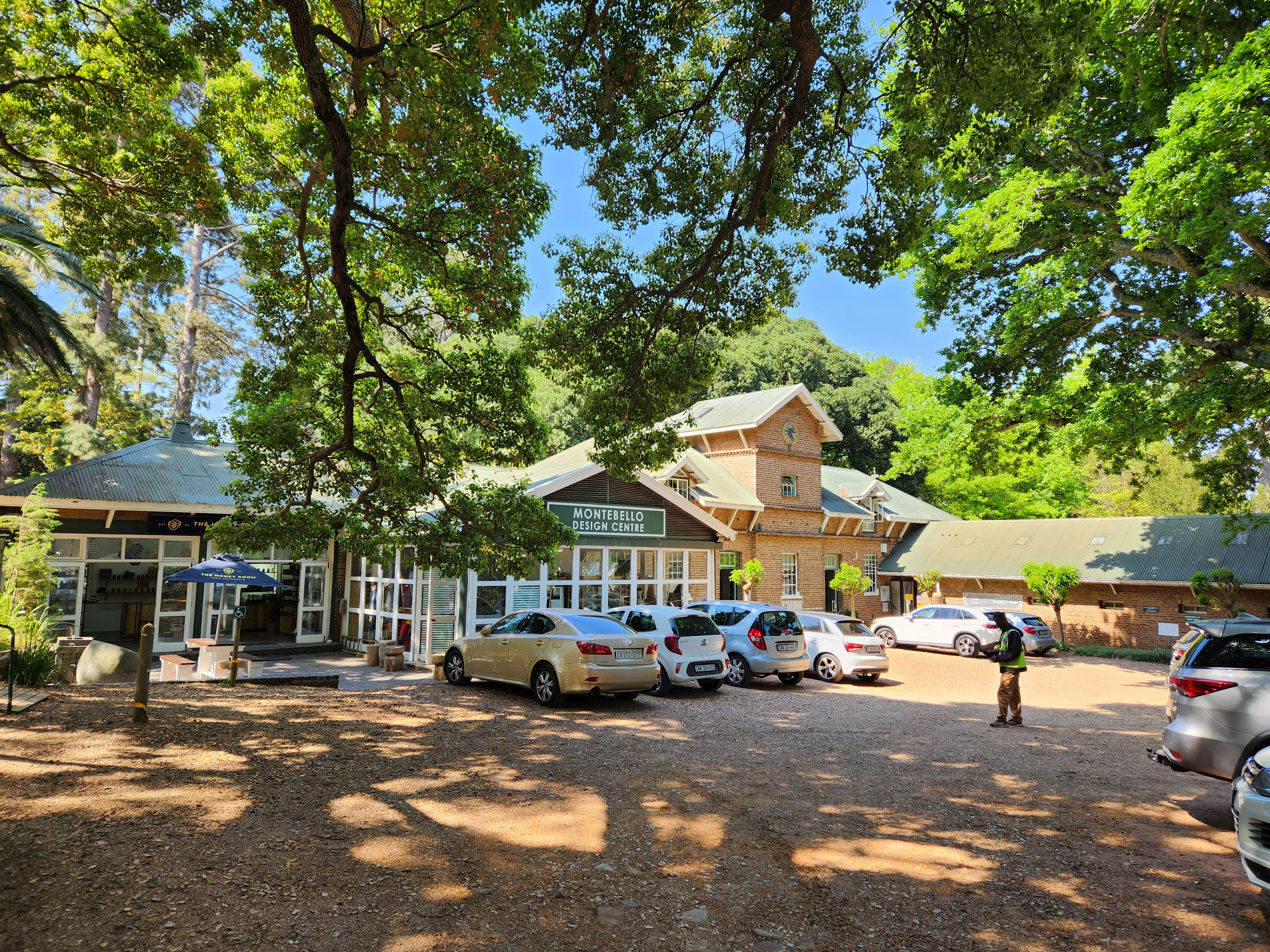
- Upper Newlands and Devil's Peak Newlands Cricket Ground & brewery Newlands Spring on Springs Way Boshof gateway Montebello Design Centre
- Interactive map of Newlands
- Coordinates: 33°58′45″S 18°27′0″E
- Country: South Africa
- Province: Western Cape
- Municipality: City of Cape Town

Area
  - Total: 3.48 km^{2} (1.34 sq mi)
- Elevation: 70 m (230 ft)

Population (2011)
  - Total: 5,100
  - Density: 1,500/km^{2} (3,800/sq mi)

Racial makeup (2011)
  - Black African: 8.9%
  - Coloured: 5.9%
  - Indian/Asian: 3.8%
  - White: 77.0%
  - Other: 4.4%

First languages (2011)
  - English: 85.7%
  - Afrikaans: 7.4%
  - Xhosa: 1.5%
  - Other: 5.3%
- Time zone: UTC+2 (SAST)
- Postal code (street): 7700
- PO box: 7725
- Area code: 021

Newlands (Nuweland) is an upmarket suburb of Cape Town, South Africa. It is located at the foot of Table Mountain in the Southern Suburbs of Cape Town, and is the wettest suburb in South Africa due to its high winter rainfall. The neighborhood of Bishopscourt is situated to its southwest, Claremont to its southeast, and Rondebosch to its east and northeast.

== History ==
Little is known of the inhabitants, likely Khoekhoe clans such as the ǃUriǁʼaekua, of the area prior to the arrival of the Dutch East India Company and the establishment of Cape Town and the Cape Colony in 1652.

Then governor of the colony, Willem Adriaan van der Stel, was granted land for an estate in 1700 which he named De Nieuwe Land or Nieuwland. The estate was sold in 1791 and changed hands a number of times until 1826. In the 1860s the estate was leased to the British Colonial Government so as to act as a country residence for Cape governors, during which time it is thought that Newlands Village was established.

A railway line to Cape Town central, extended from Salt River, was opened in the neighborhood on 19 December 1864.

== Notable locations ==
It is best known for Newlands Cricket Ground and Newlands Stadium, a rugby union and football venue. It is also the original home of Ohlsson's Cape Breweries, which is still located next to the rugby grounds. The original Ohlsson's Anneberg Brewery site is now location of the SACS grounds. The only remainder of the original brewery is the Josephine Mill, which used a water wheel to grind the grain for the brewery. This is now a historic monument and restaurant. Next door to SACS is the Montebello Design Centre located within the historic stables of Cecil Michaelis's estate and bequeathed to the University of Cape Town.

The pipeline from the Table Mountain spring which supplies the Newlands Brewery runs under the historic Cardiff Castle Building which is located in Newlands Village.

The Liesbeek River runs through Newlands, past the Vineyard Hotel, and was the original water source used to make the first European-style beer in southern Africa. Friends of The Liesbeek maintain a walk along the river bank, past landmarks in the area.

The distinctive southern half of Newlands, bordering the suburb Bishopscourt, is known as Fernwood, after a farm estate which used to occupy this area. The original manor house of this estate still exists, but is now used as a parliamentary sports club.

In 1967 the first Spur Steak Ranch was opened on Dean Street in Newlands.

=== Parks ===
The neighborhood is the location of a number of notable parks such as Newlands Forest and Kirstenbosch National Botanical Gardens.

Newlands Forest is incorporated within the Table Mountain National Park. The forest is a popular outdoor recreation area which includes surviving remnants of indigenous afro-temperate forest and endangered Granite Fynbos, as well as extensive pine plantations. There are also historic sites including the Woodcutter's Cottage and Lady Anne Barnard's Path. Newlands is home to the indigenous frog species Rose's ghost frog and sandellia, a tiny frog that lives in the waters of the Liesbeek river.

=== Newlands spring ===
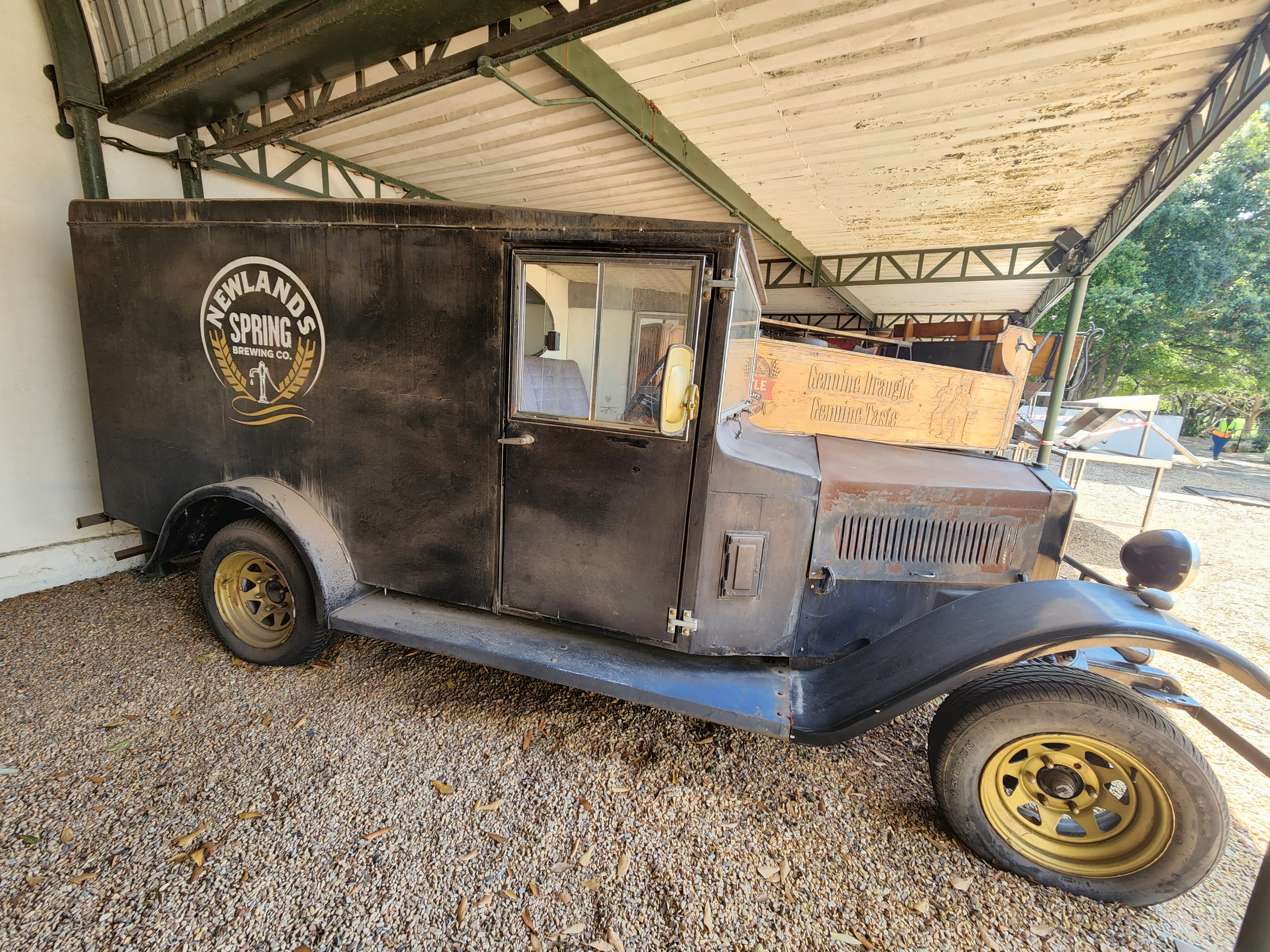
An early 20th-century delivery vehicle for the Newlands Spring Brewing company. The beer brewing industry was historically a major economic activity in Newlands.

The fresh water springs in Newlands have played an important role in the development and history of the area. The springs are locally renowned for the high quality of the water they produce. It is still a popular practice for Capetonians to collect water at the springs. The main spring is located at the South African Breweries brewery on the corner of Main and Letterstead Road. A second popular spring was located on Kildare Road but was closed during the Cape Town water crisis in 2018 following a physical altercation between water collectors. Other reasons given for its closure by the municipality were that the council found water collection difficult to regulate at the site, and there had been complaints from locals about noise and traffic congestion.

The water at the springs has played an important role in the brewing industry, with South Africa's first licensed brewery being set up in the area at Papenboom in 1694. Water from the springs was also used to power water mills from the mid-1800s onwards.

== Education ==
Newlands is home to a number of schools, including the South African College Schools (SACS) Junior and High Schools as well as Groote Schuur High School and Sans Souci Girls' High School.

The Imhoff sports grounds of Westerford High School (which borders the neighborhood) is also located within Newlands.

The Peter Clarke Art Centre is located in the southeastern corner of the neighborhood.

== Notable residents ==
- Alexander du Toit (1878-1948), geologist
- Cecil Michaelis (1913-1997), artist and philanthropist
- Barry Streek (1948-2006), journalist and anti-apartheid activist
- Edward Neville Syfret (1889-1972), naval officer and admiral
