= Bishopscourt, Cape Town =

Residential Southern Suburb of Cape Town, South Africa

Bishopscourt
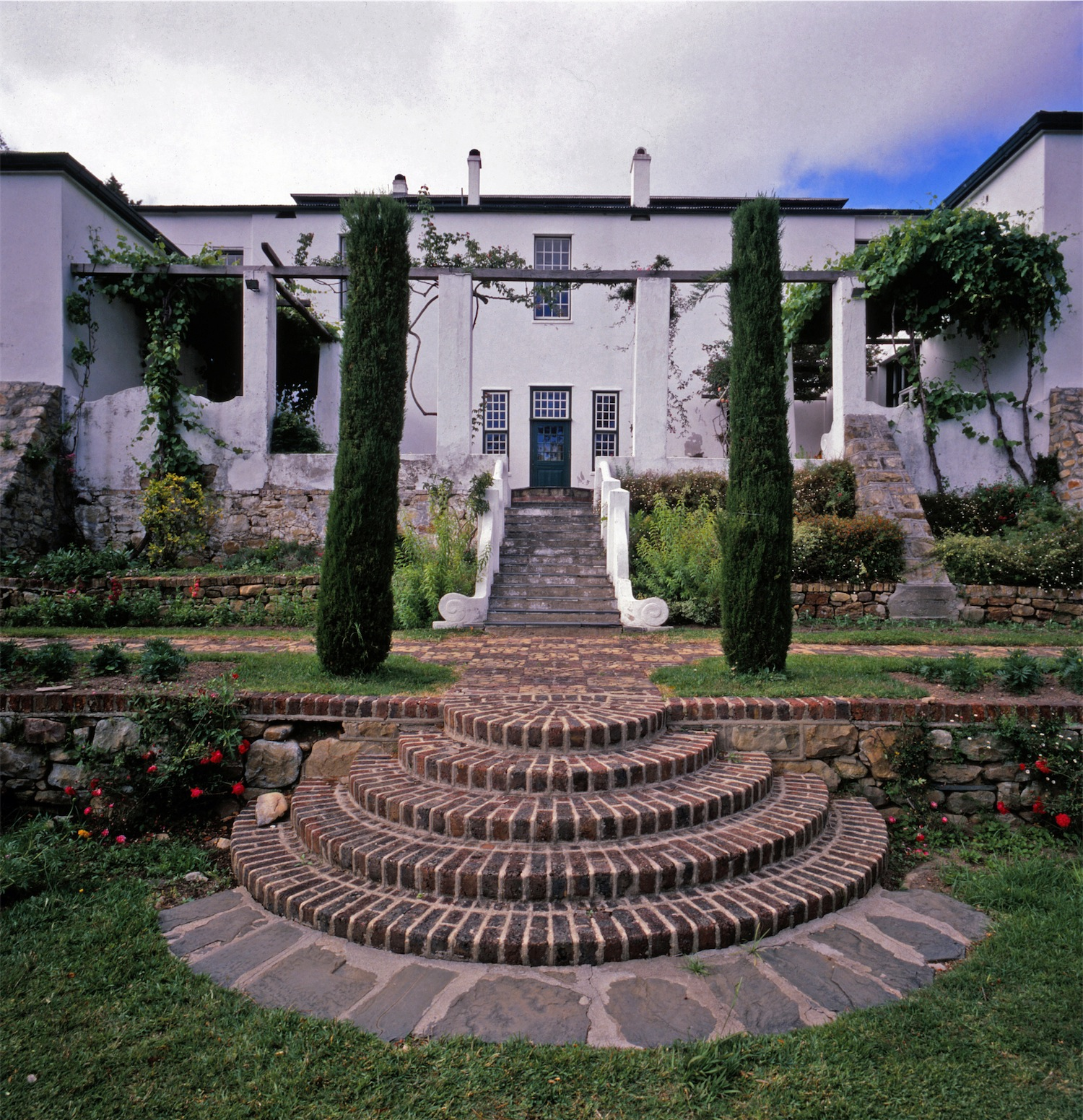
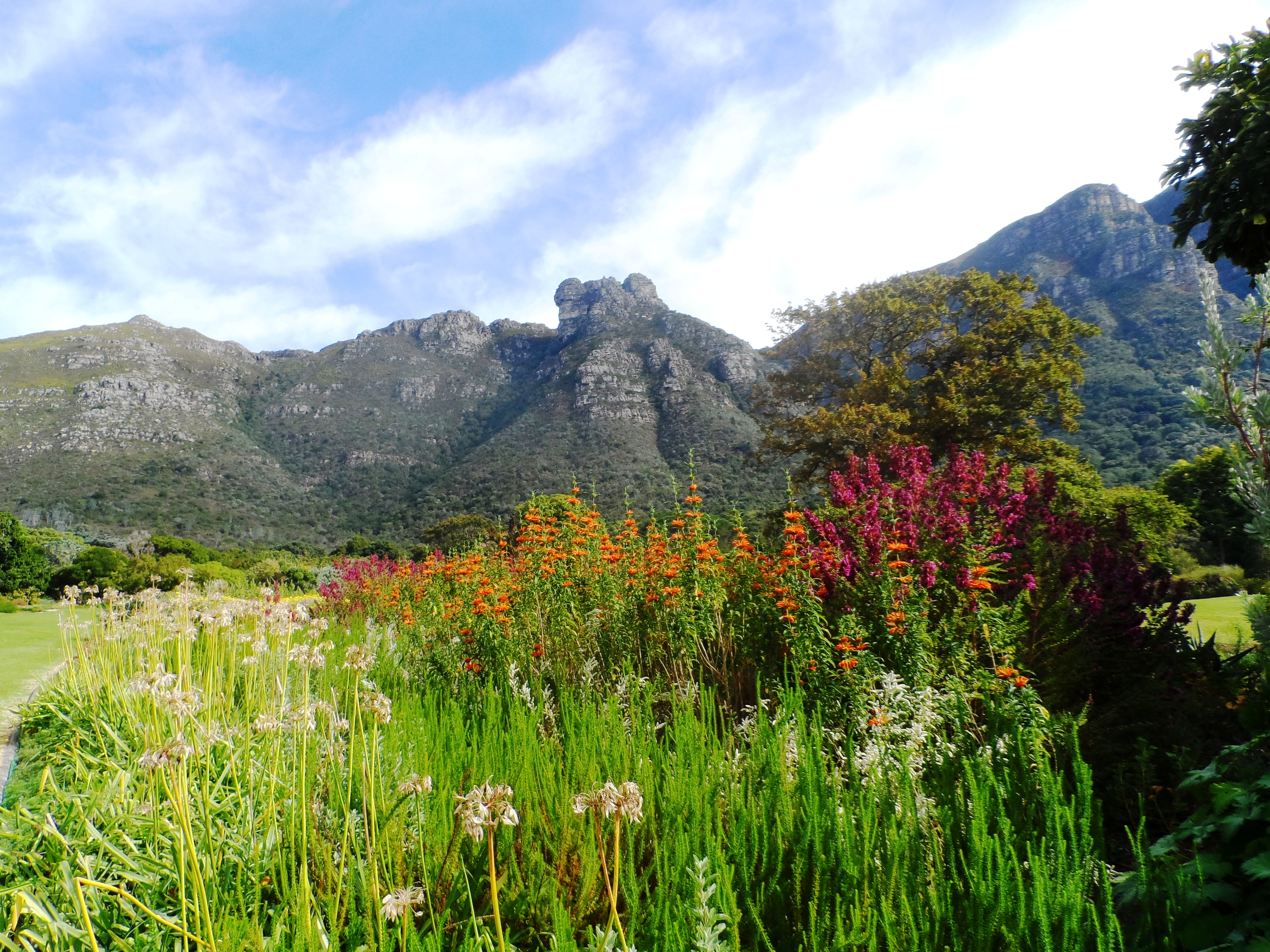
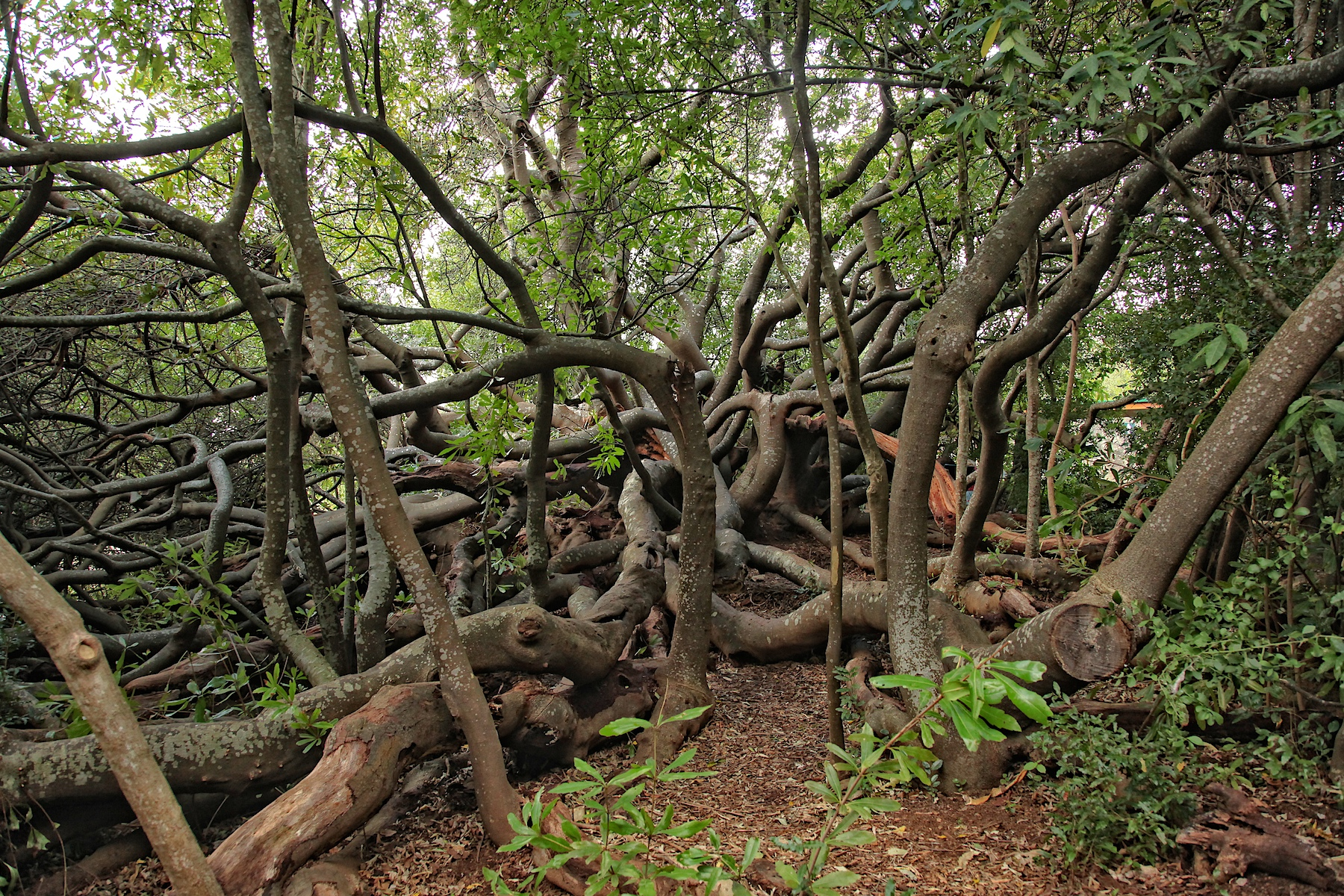
- Top, the historic Bishopscourt residence of Anglican archbishop. Bottom left, Kirstenbosch Botanical Gardens is located to the immediate west of Bishopscourt. Bottom right, remaining part of Van Riebeeck's Hedge that used to run through the area.
- Interactive map of Bishopscourt
- Coordinates: 33°59′25″S 18°26′45″E
- Country: South Africa
- Province: Western Cape
- Municipality: City of Cape Town

Area
  - Total: 2.31 km^{2} (0.89 sq mi)
- Elevation: 103 m (338 ft)

Population (2011)
  - Total: 1,603
  - Density: 694/km^{2} (1,800/sq mi)

Racial makeup (2011)
  - Black African: 12.7%
  - Coloured: 5.2%
  - Indian/Asian: 5.5%
  - White: 74.0%
  - Other: 2.6%

First languages (2011)
  - English: 85.3%
  - Afrikaans: 5.1%
  - Xhosa: 3.0%
  - Other: 6.6%
- Time zone: UTC+2 (SAST)
- Postal code (street): 7708
- Area code: 021

Bishopscourt is a small, wealthy, residential suburb in the Southern Suburbs region of Cape Town, South Africa. The suburb has approximately 350 houses, most of which are situated on more than 4,000 square metres (1 acre) of land.

Bishopscourt includes the official residence of the Archbishop of Cape Town, which is known as Bishopscourt, whence comes the name of the suburb. It is also the location of a large number of foreign consulates and embassies. Along with the neighbouring suburbs of Newlands and Claremont, Bishopscourt is located in an area at the foot of Table Mountain that attractions considerably more rainfall than the rest of the Cape Peninsula.

In 2015, it was ranked the sixth richest suburb in South Africa, with an average property value of R11 million.

== History ==
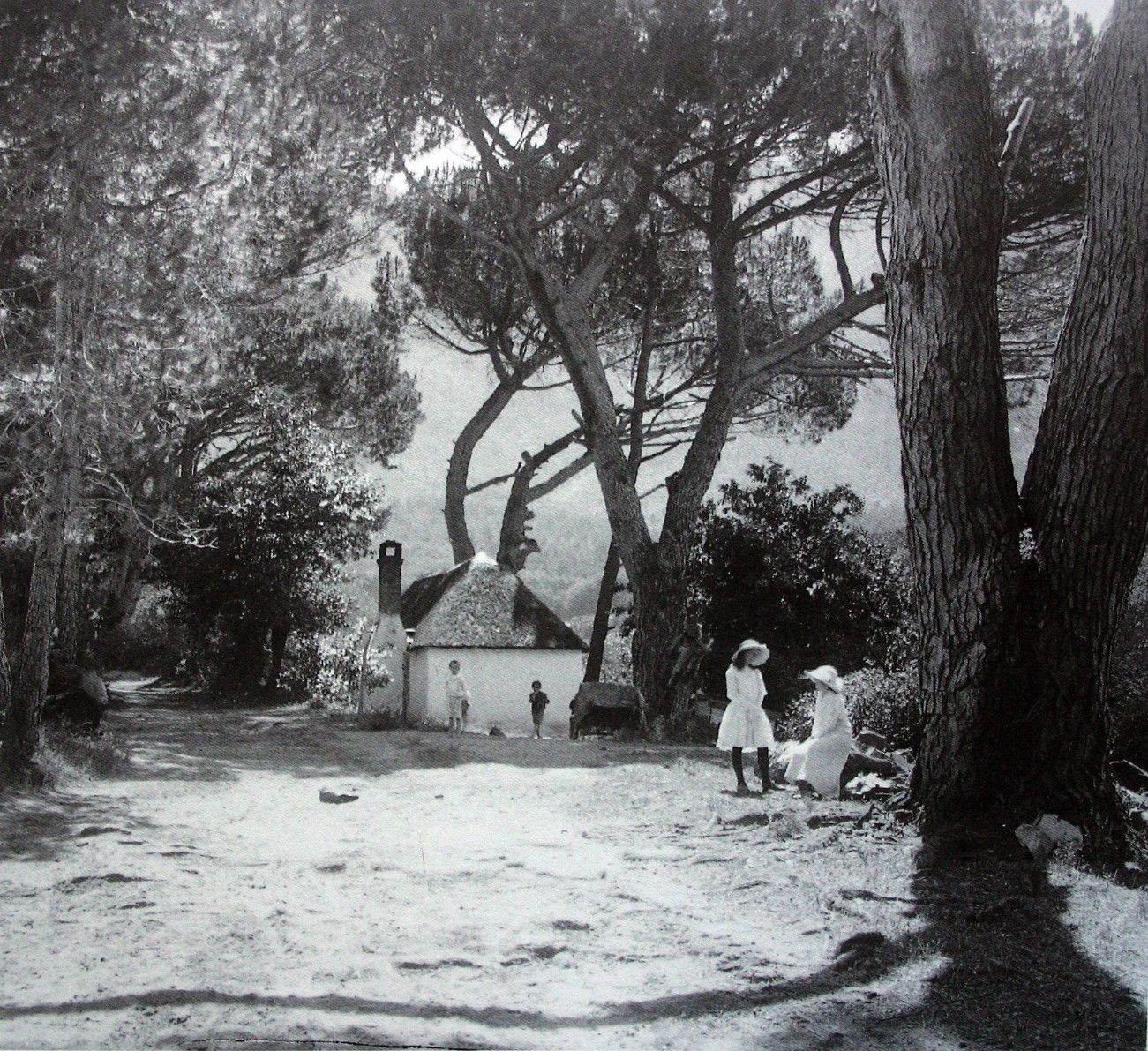
A cottage in Bishopscourt around the turn of the 20th century taken by Arthur Elliott.

Following the establishment of the Dutch East India Company in 1652, the land that would later become Bishopscourt was originally the site of a farm called Boscheuvel ("Bush Hill"), managed by Jan van Riebeeck, the first colonial governor of the Cape. The farm was known for cultivating a range of imported grapevines, fruit trees, and nut trees.

=== Forced removals ===
Between 1959 and 1970, 132 families were forcibly removed from the area under the terms of the Group Areas Act, the apartheid legislation which declared the area to be for white residents only. Following the end of apartheid, a land claim was instituted in 1995, and claimants were granted erven in 2006. Construction of homes for the 86 families that opted for the return of rights to their land began in 2025.

== Nearby places of interest ==
- Kirstenbosch National Botanical Garden
