= Bradley Fried =

British businessman (born 1965)

Sir Bradley Fried
- Born: August 12, 1965 (age 61); Cape Town, South Africa
- Education: University of Cape Town; Wharton School of the University of Pennsylvania
- Occupation: Businessman
- Title: Chair, Goldman Sachs International
- Spouse: Lauren Fried
- Children: 2

Sir Bradley Fried (born 12 August 1965) is a South African-British businessman. He is the chairman of Goldman Sachs International. He co-founded Grovepoint Capital, prior to which he was chief executive of Investec Bank Plc, and previously served as chairman of the Court of the Bank of England. He was previously also a non-executive board member of the Financial Conduct Authority.

== Early life ==
Fried was born into a Jewish family in Cape Town, South Africa. He attended Westerford High School in Rondebosch, Cape Town from 1979 until his matriculation in 1983. He has a bachelor's degree in commerce, awarded with distinction, from the University of Cape Town. He was a Palmer Scholar at the Wharton School of the University of Pennsylvania, where he was awarded a master's degree in business administration (MBA) with distinction. He is also a qualified chartered accountant, having trained with Arthur Andersen in South Africa.

== Career ==
Fried was a partner at McKinsey & Company in New York, where he focused on strategy consulting to the financial services industry.

Fried joined Investec Bank in the UK in 1999, where he served as chief operating officer and chief executive. He subsequently served as a non-executive director of Investec Plc and Investec Limited between 2010 and 2016.

Fried co-founded Grovepoint Capital with Leon Blitz, a private equity firm, specialising in growth capital investments, in 2010. The firm has since overseen investments exceeding $1 billion, focusing primarily on the UK, Israel, and Germany. A significant portion of Grovepoint's investments are directed toward Israel, including a $50 million investment in Algatech, a company cultivating micro-algae in the Arava desert. Fried has emphasized the importance of supporting Israel's innovation while adhering to international law, explicitly avoiding projects in disputed territories.

Fried served as a non-executive director of the Court of the Bank of England from July 2012 to June 2022, and served as Chair of Court from July 2018 to June 2022.

Fried chaired the Review Committee that examined the "Bank of England's approach to conflicts of interest." The report was released in August 2017.

He was previously on the Board of Directors of Partners Capital.

Fried joined Preqin's Board of Directors in 2019, becoming Chair in May 2022.

Fried has been appointed Chair of Goldman Sachs International with effect from February 2023.

He was knighted in the 2022 Birthday Honours for public service for his work with the Bank of England.

== Personal life ==
Fried is a Governor at the London Business School. He was a Fellow at Magdalene College, Cambridge, and was previously CEO-in-Residence of the Cambridge Judge Business School.

He and his wife, Lauren, have two sons, and lives in St. John's Wood. They met as teenagers while both were involved in a South African Habonim camp.

Fried attended cheder and participated in the Claremont Synagogue choir. He has characterized his Jewish identity as a central aspect of his life, shaped by a predominantly Lithuanian heritage and family roots in Jerusalem that extend over 300 years. Fried has emphasized his deep commitment to supporting Israel. He frequently travels to Israel and maintains a home in Herzliya.
