= Bindlach =

- Municipality
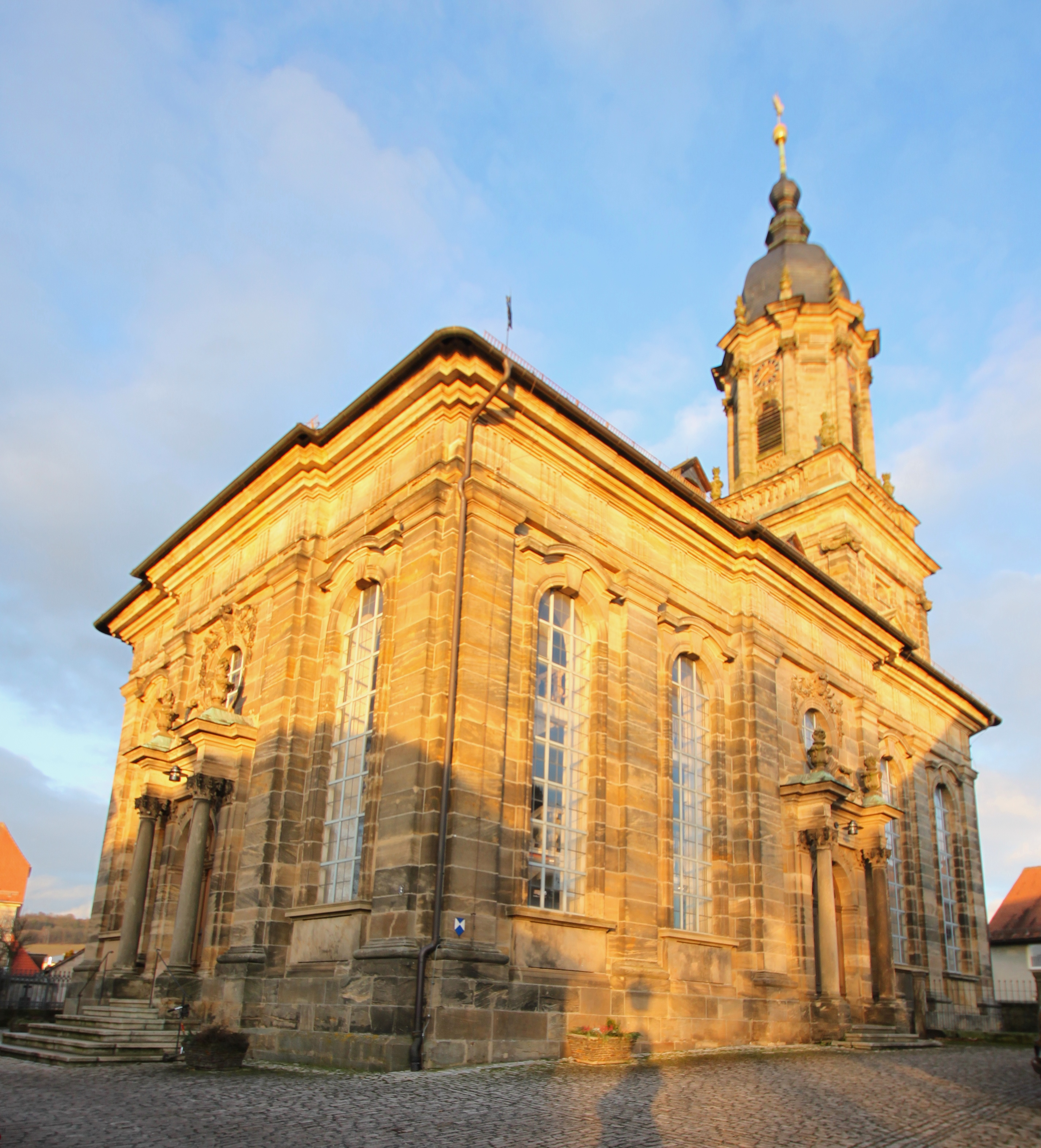
- Church of Saint Bartholomew

- Coat of arms

- Location of Bindlach within Bayreuth district
- Interactive map of Bindlach
- Location within Germany Location within Bavaria
- Coordinates: 49°58′N 11°36′E
- Country: Germany
- State: Bavaria
- Admin. region: Oberfranken
- District: Bayreuth
- Subdivisions: 7 Ortsteile

Government
  - Mayor (2020–26): Christian Brunner (CSU)

Area
  - Total: 37.60 km^{2} (14.52 sq mi)
- Elevation: 362 m (1,188 ft)

Population (2025-12-31)
  - Total: 7,127
  - Density: 189.5/km^{2} (490.9/sq mi)
- Time zone: UTC+01:00 (CET)
  - Summer (DST): UTC+02:00 (CEST)
- Postal codes: 95463
- Dialling codes: 09208
- Vehicle registration: BT
- Website: www.bindlach.de

Bindlach is a municipality in the district of Bayreuth in Upper Franconia in Bavaria, Germany. The town is adjacent immediately north of the town of Bayreuth. The population count of December 2006 was 7197 inhabitants.

== History ==
The name Bindlach is derived from the Slavic Pnetluky containing the verb tlouki which means "to chop". Thus Bindlach can be translated with "Village of the people chopping trunks" as the village is situated in an area rich with woods and a clearance had to be created prior to settlement.

More recent research traces the name back to the Old Saxon word Binutlaka meaning "Small, standing lake overgrown with juncus". Charlemagne supposedly resettled deported Saxons in the area.

Archaeological excavations have produced Celtic leftovers as well as remains from the Urnfield culture and the Bronze Age giving proof of settlement as early as 1300 BC.

The first official mentioning in modern times occurred in a private charter on April 6, 1178 as bintlvke.

Being part of the Prussian Principality of Bayreuth, Bindlach was ceded to France in 1807 following the Treaties of Tilsit. In 1810 it became part of the Kingdom of Bavaria. The town as it is known today was formed in 1818.

== Culture ==
Bindlach's Protestant church St. Bartholomew was built in the baroque style between 1766 and 1768 by Carl Phillip von Gontard and Rudolf Heinrich Richter. The altar with integrated pulpit and the organ are of extraordinary beauty.

== Economy ==
The German clothing discount store chain NKD (retailer) is headquartered in Bindlach.

== Infrastructure ==
Bindlach is situated on the Bayreuth–Neuenmarkt-Wirsberg line and is served by local trains. The Autobahn A9 crosses through Bindlach at the western edge of the old part of the town, separating it from the newer parts built in the 1950s, 60s and 70s. Bundesstraße 2 runs through the old part of the town linking Bayreuth and Bad Berneck. Bayreuth Airport is on top of the hills on the eastern side of town; despite the name on Bindlach territory.

== Military ==
Overlooking Bindlach from the east, a large American military base was maintained on top of the hills east of Bindlach (Bindlacher Berg). Its official name was Christensen Barracks but it was called The Rock by the soldiers stationed there. The main function of the base was securing the borders to the GDR and Czechoslovakia, both borders being only 70 km (43 mls) away. This was home to the 1st Squadron, 2nd ACR, (2nd Cavalry Regiment (United States)) from the late 1950s into the 1990s. The base closed down in the early 1990s after German reunification and the opening of the borders to the east.
