= Arthur Elliott (photographer) =

South African photographer

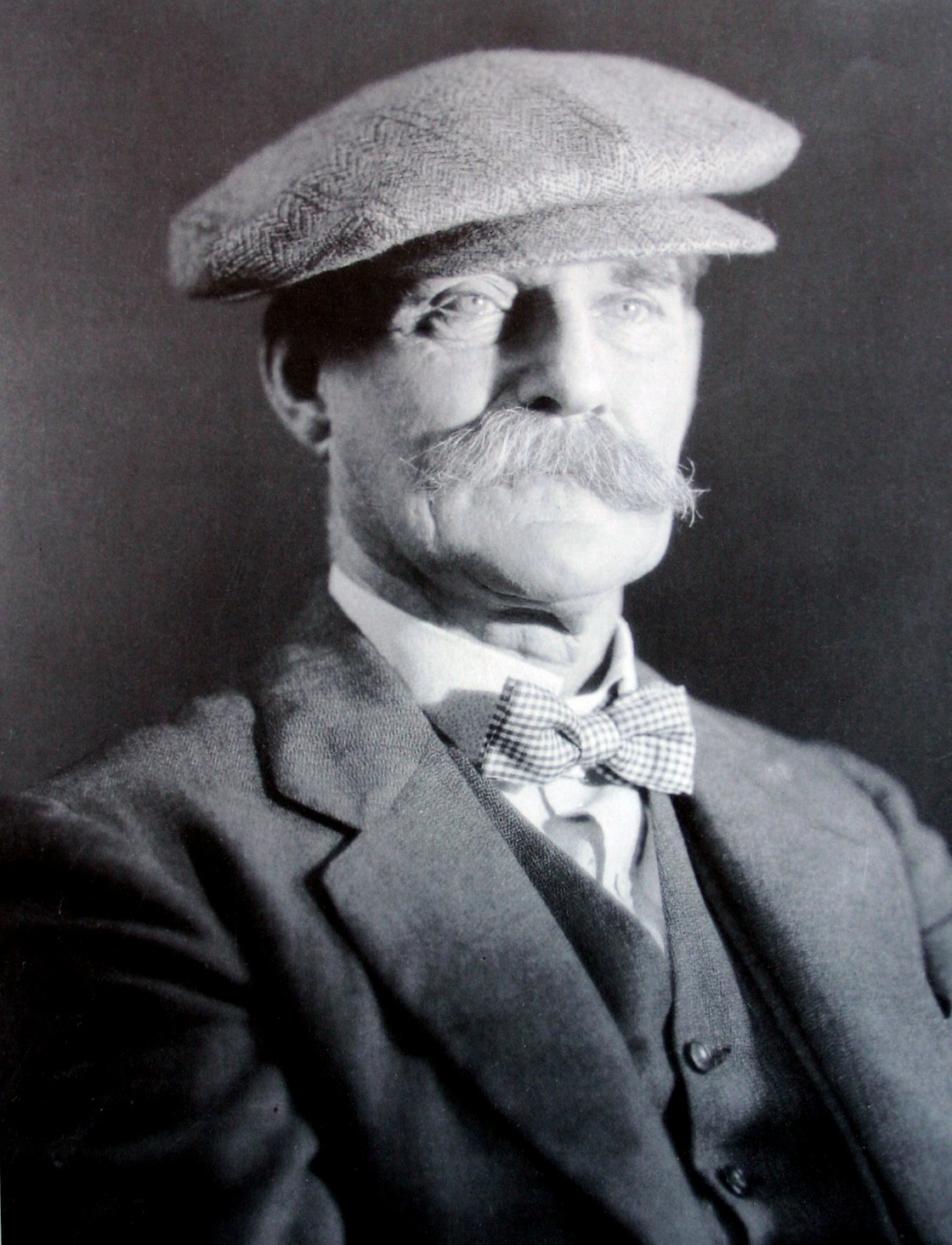
- Arthur Elliott self-portrait
- Born: 1870; New York City, New York, United States
- Died: 20 November 1938 (aged 75–76); Cape Town, Union of South Africa
- Occupation: photographer
- Years active: 1900-1930
- Known for: architectural & street photography

Arthur Elliott (1870, New York City – 20 November 1938, Cape Town), was an American born South African photographer who recorded the architecture and daily life of the Cape. Elliott took over 10,000 photographs of Cape Dutch architecture, creating an unrivalled pictorial record of early 20th century buildings at the Cape.

== Life ==
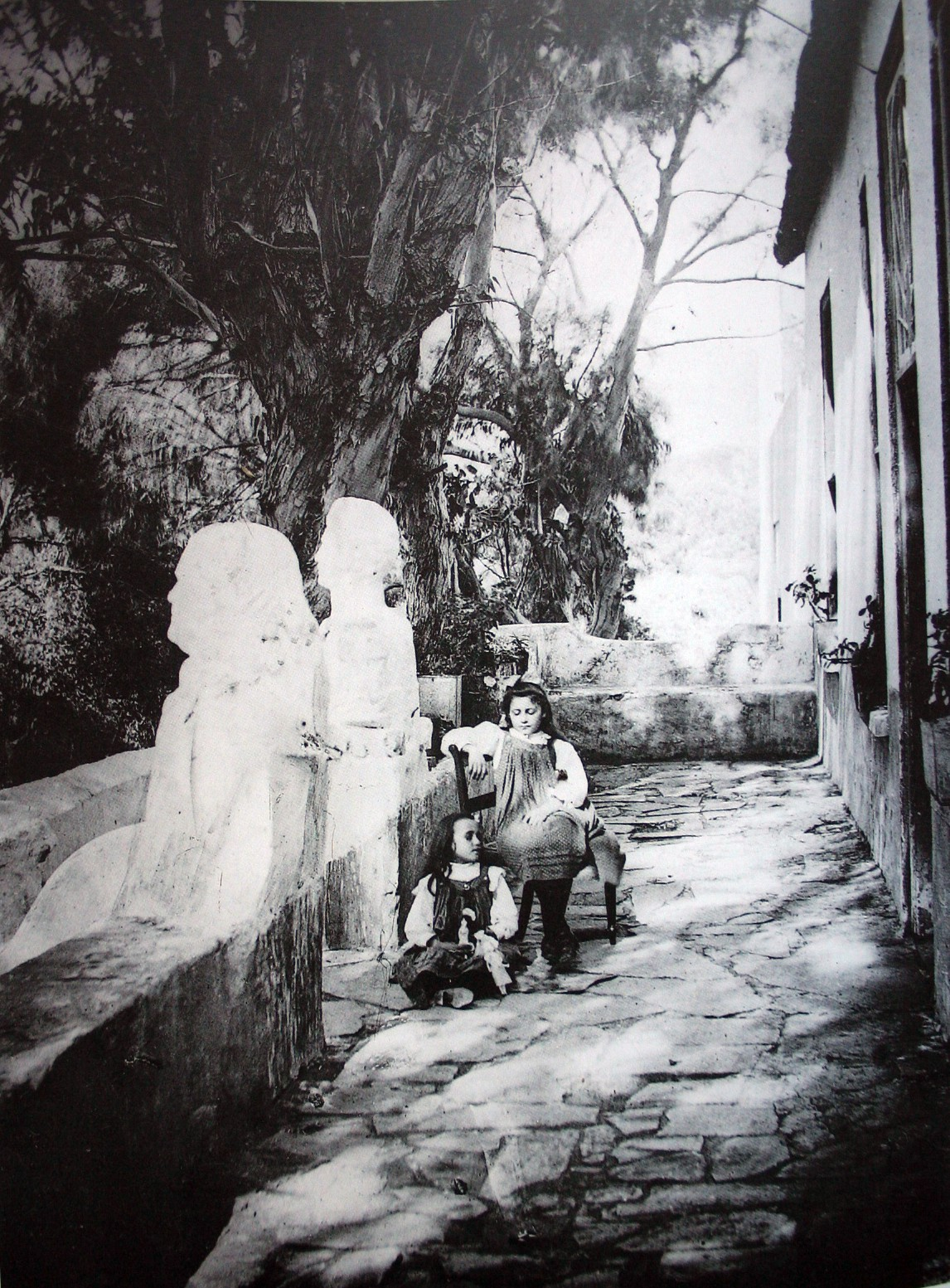
Imhoff's Gift House built on the farm Noordhoek given by Baron Gustav Wilhelm van Imhoff to the widow Christina Rousseau

Elliott was born in New York City in 1870 to Scottish parents. He was orphaned at 12 years old and worked in a series of odd jobs. A job as a ships crew member took him to England and India before arriving in South Africa at the age of 30. He tried his hand at various jobs such as phonograph salesman, scene-painter and production manager at the Luscombe Searelle Acting Company in Johannesburg.

Elliott died in Cape Town on November 30, 1938.

== Work ==
Anglo-Boer war prompted Elliott to started taking photographs. The war caused him to move to Cape Town as a war refugee in 1900 where he took to photography as a fulltime profession and passion. He acquired a quarter-plate (3.25 × 4.25 inches) camera from a friend and had his first success selling selling photographs of Boer prisoners of war to British soldiers in the Cape.

His home in Cape Town is commemorated by a plaque at 134 Long Street. He had a number of major exhibitions in Cape Town; in 1910, 1913 (with a catalogue compiled by Theal and F.K. Kendall's article on Cape architecture), in 1926 (with an introduction by Sir George Cory, the historian), another in 1930, arranged by W.R. Morrison. His final exhibition, in 1938, was titled "The Cape, Quant and Beautiful” and included a catalogue edited by Victor de Kockin. These gave him widespread recognition and enabled him to eke out a living through the selling of prints. During his life he took more than 11,000 photographs of the Cape, the most comprehensive collection of images of life at the Cape during that period ever collected.

Elliott seems to have been determined to record as much as he was able of the old farmhouses, buildings and streets that were rapidly disappearing with the ever-growing pressure to modernize. During his lifetime only a portfolio of some of his images was published for the use of schools, but in 1969 he authored selection of his best images, showing farmsteads and historic buildings, with an introduction and annotations by Hans Fransen. Before his death, Elliott offered his collection of photographs to the local government for £5000; the offer was declined. After his death, his collection was acquired by the Government and presented to the Cape Archives. A further 1,000 photographs from the collection of W.R. Morrison were added later. The Elliott Collection, as his set of images came to be called, has been used extensively by authors writing about all aspects of old Cape architecture.

=== Gallery of work ===
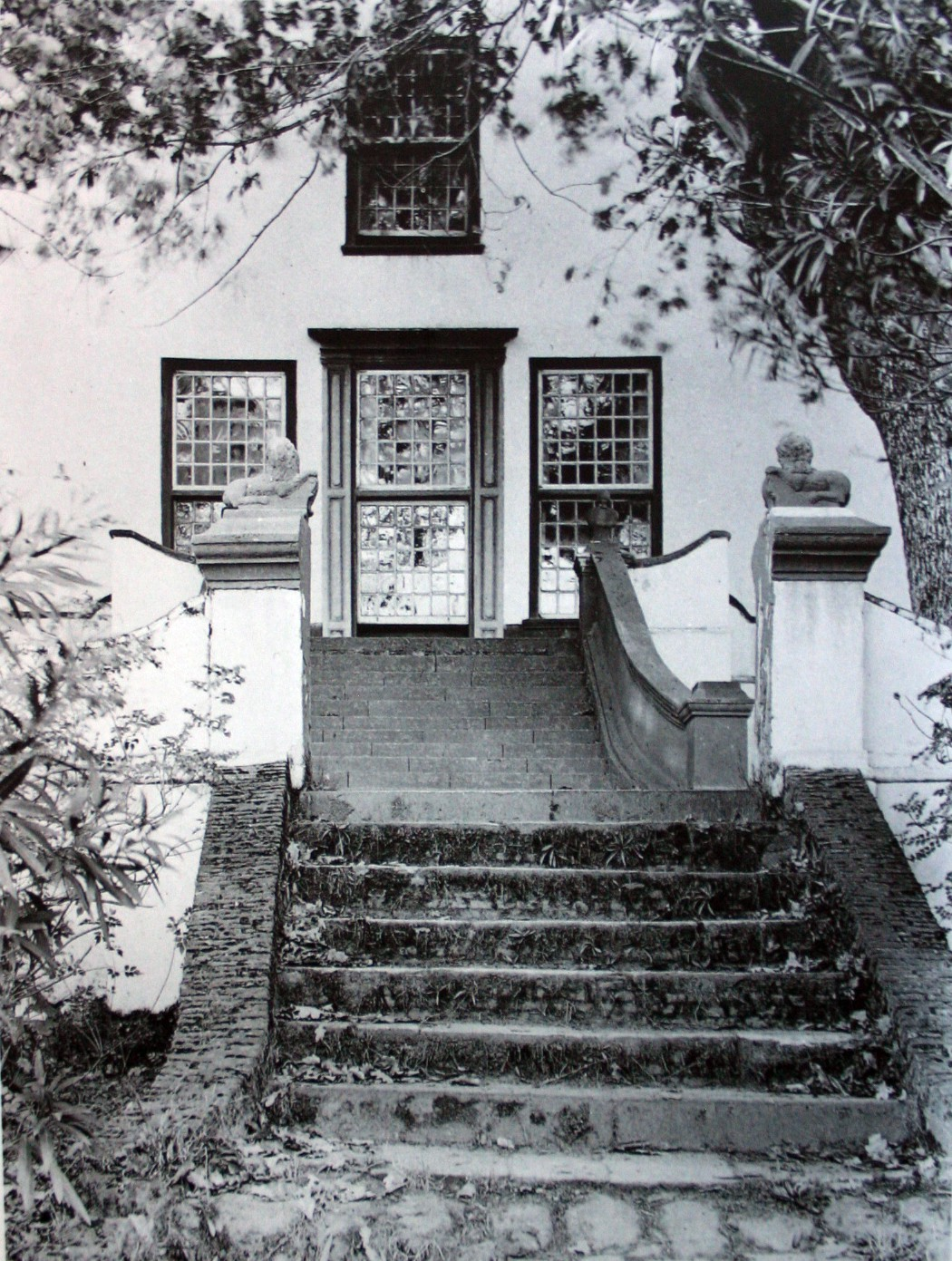
Alphen, 18th century farmhouse

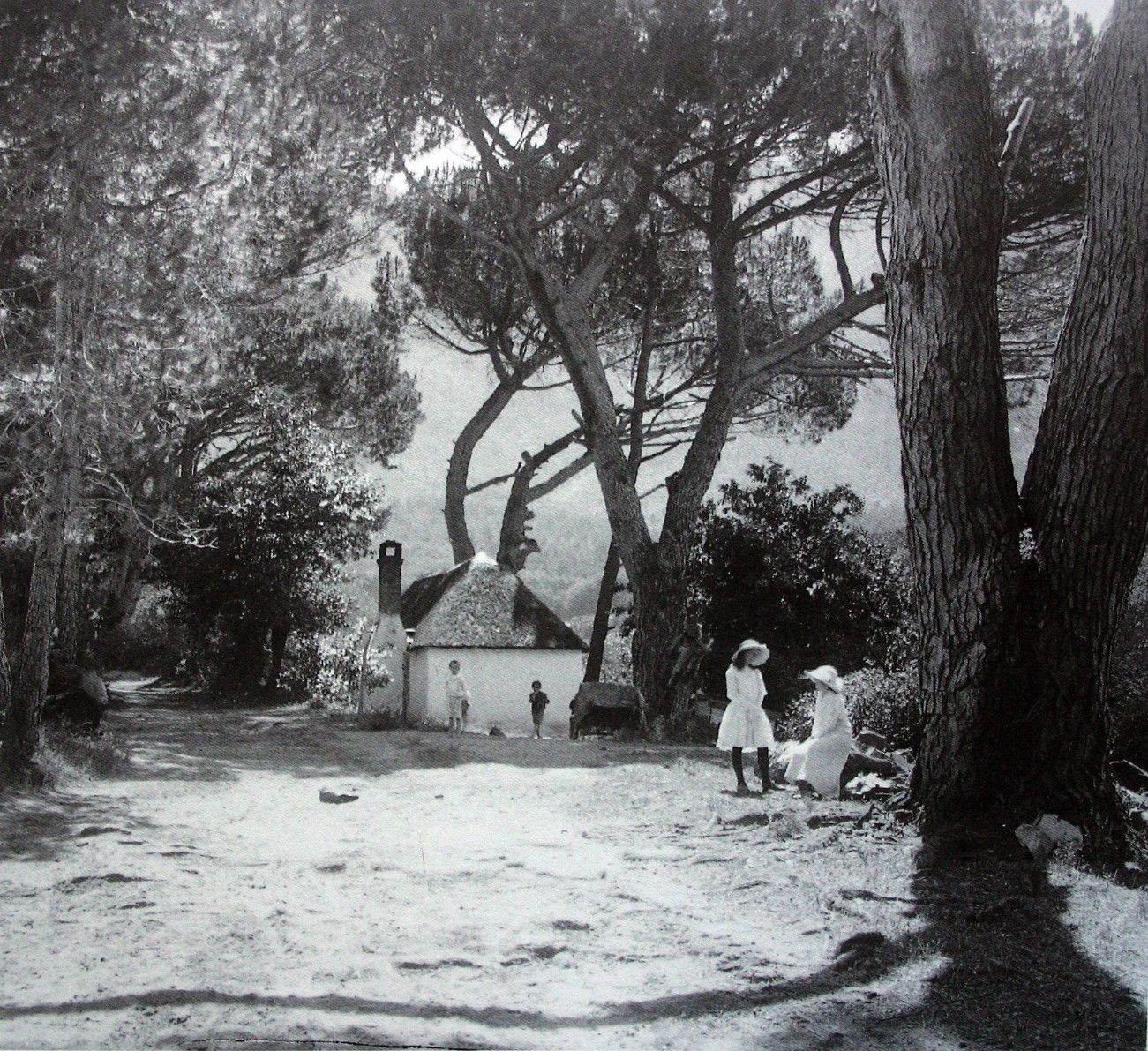
Cottage at Bishopscourt

Rhone House, Stellenbosch

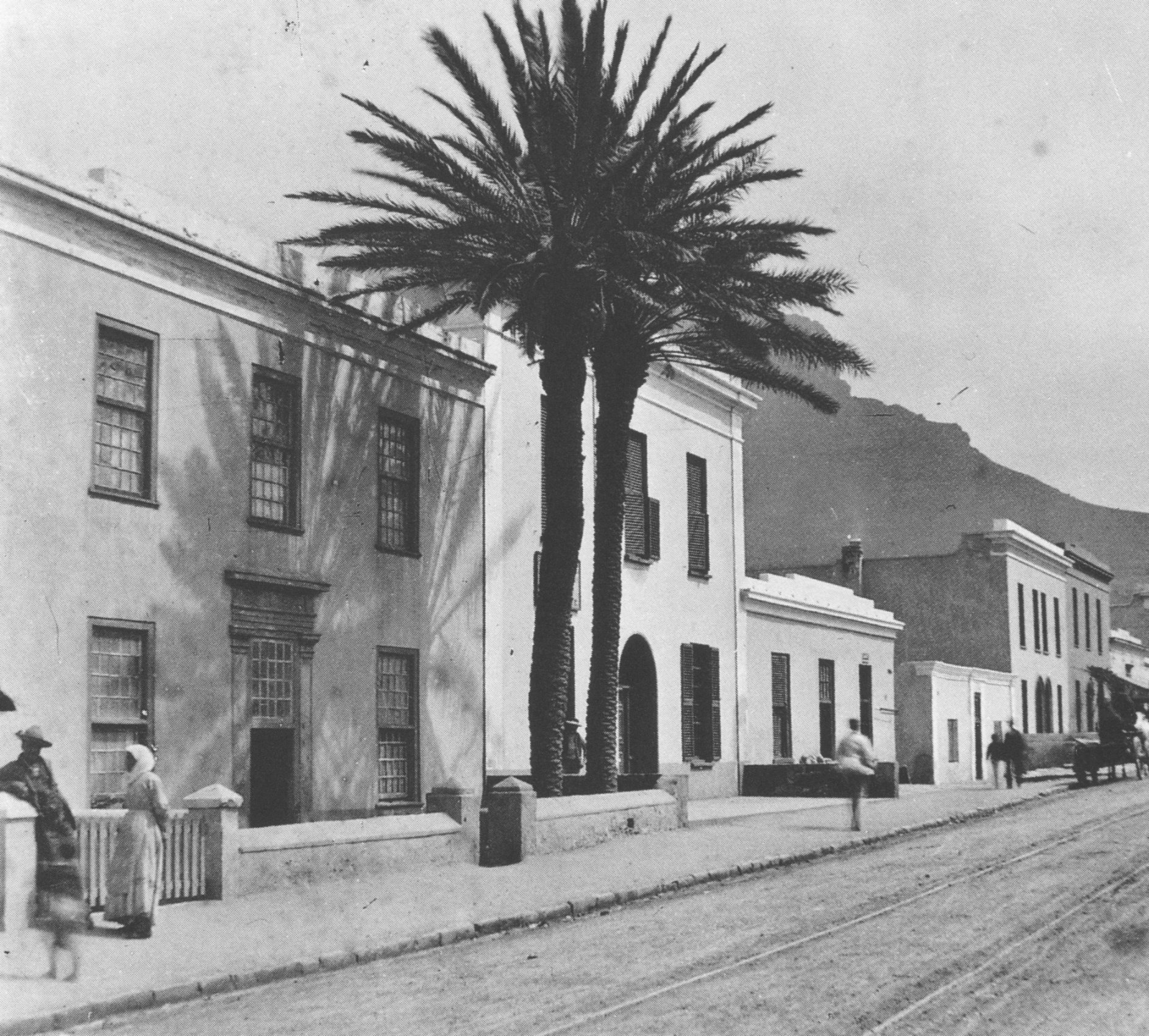
The Palm Tree Mosque, 1915

Two children outside the tomb of Sheik Yusuf

Main Street, Swellendam at the turn of the 20th century

Jonkershuis, Groot-Constantia

== Bibliography ==
- Laidler, P. W. Arthur Elliott, a Sentimental Appreciation. Cape Town.
- Lighton, C. Arthur Elliott; a Memoir of the Man and the Story of his Photographic Collection. Cape Town, 1956.
- Architectural Beauty of the Cape as seen by Arthur Elliott – Hans Fransen (Balkema, Cape Town 1969)
