= NKD (retailer) =

German clothing discount store chain

NKD Group GmbH
- Company type: GmbH
- Industry: Retail
- Founded: 1962
- Founder: Burkard Hellbach
- Headquarters: Bindlach, Germany
- Area served: Germany, Austria, Slovenia, Croatia, Italy, Poland, Czech Republic
- Key people: Alexander Schmökel CEO, Nils Bolender CFO, Christian Welles (Chief Sales Officer)
- Products: Clothing and Non-Food products
- Revenue: € 820 (2023) million
- Number of employees: est. 10,000 (2024)
- Website: https://www.nkd.com

NKD is a German clothing discount store chain headquartered in Bindlach, Germany. With about 2,100 stores in Germany, Austria, Italy, Slovenia, Croatia, Czech Republic, and Poland, an online shop and over 10,000 employees, NKD is one of the largest fashion retail companies in Germany.

== History ==
In 1962 founder Burkard Hellbach opened the first retail store named NK Discount in Essen-Rüttenscheid, Germany. By 1985 the 250th store was opened and by 1989 the 500th store was opened. NKD first internationalized in 1995 via a takeover of around 100 stores owned by Hertz TPS (Tief Preis Shop) headquartered in Wels, Austria. In 2006 NKD entered Italy. In 2008 NKD entered Slovenia. In 2010 NKD entered Croatia. In 2022 NKD entered Poland.

Since 2007 NKD also sells its products online.

=== Insolvency proceedings ===
In March 2001 the NKD holding company filed for insolvency at the district court of Bayreuth with the insolvency proceedings starting shortly after. Around 18 months later, NKD successfully restructured and refinanced ending the insolvency proceedings.

=== Embezzlement scandal ===
In November 2013 embezzlement charges involving Euro 3.7 million were brought against former managing director Michael Krause, at that time already in pre-trial custody, and one of his employees by the prosecution Hof (district). In April 2015, Krause was convicted of embezzlement and received a six-year prison sentence.

== Ownership ==
Founder Burkard Hellbach, who died in 2006, left NKD in 2001 and the company was integrated into the Daun Group. In 2013 finance investor OpCapita from London, UK bought NKD from the Daun Group and six years later private equity firm TDR Capital acquired NKD from OpCapita.

== See also ==
- KiK
