= Max Michaelis =

South African mining magnate (1852–1932)

Sir Max Michaelis KCMG
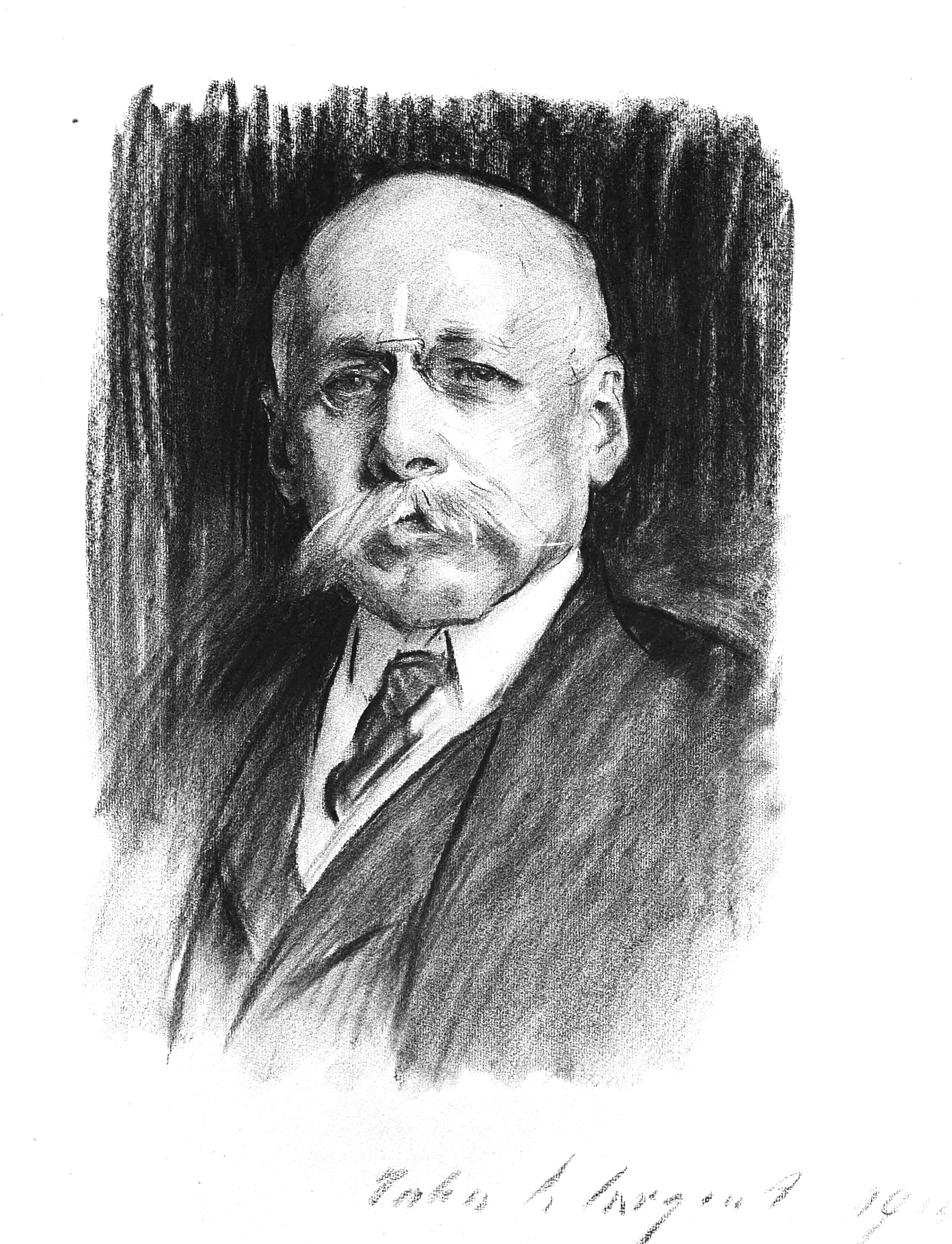
- Max Michaelis by John Singer Sargent
- Born: Maximillian Michaelis; 26 May 1851; Eisfeld, Germany
- Died: 26 January 1932 (aged 80); Zürich, Switzerland
- Occupations: Financier, mining magnate, benefactor and patron of the arts
- Spouse: Lillian Elizabeth Michaelis
- Children: 3, including Cecil Michaelis

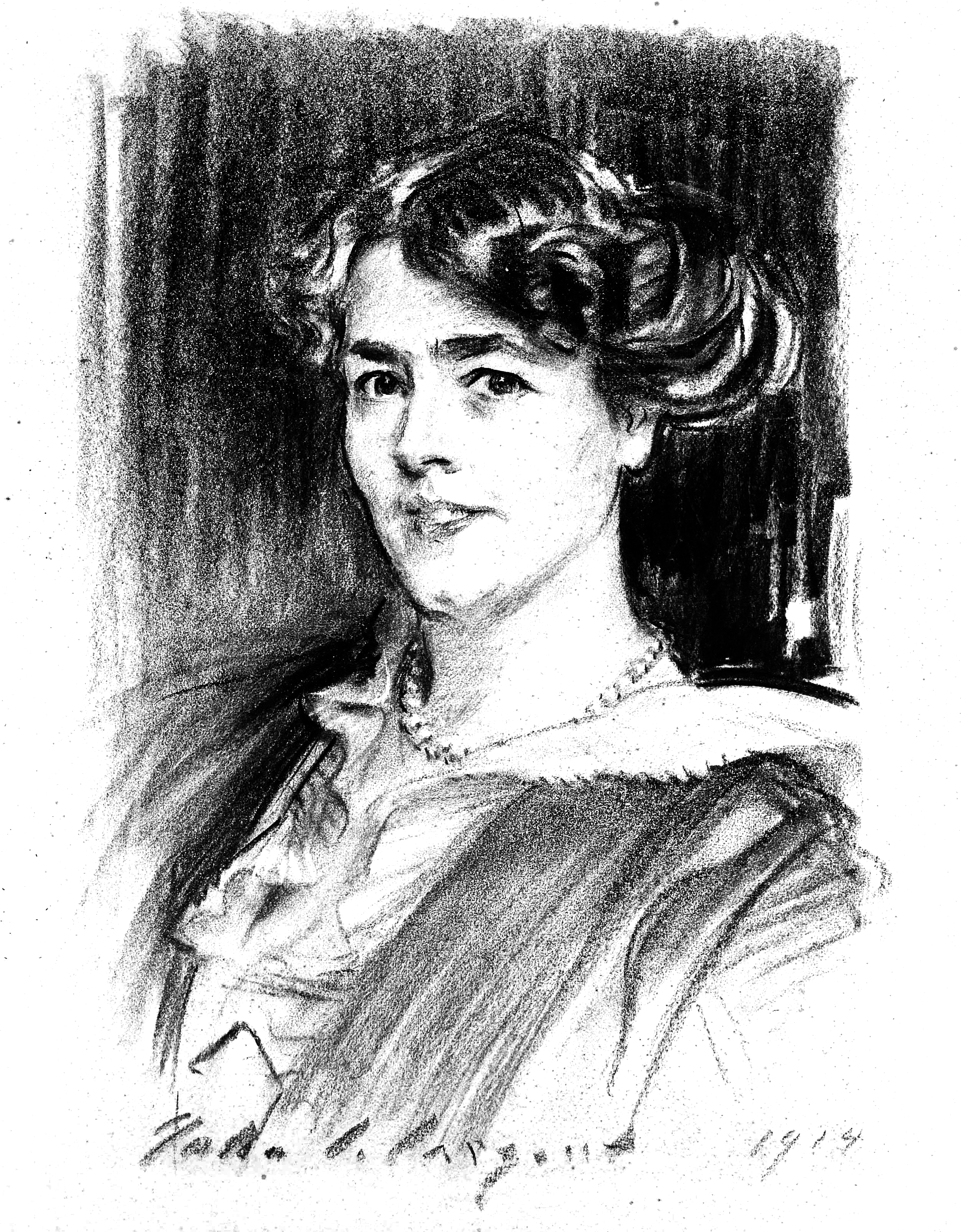
Lady Michaelis by John Singer Sargent

Sir Maximillian Michaelis, KCMG (11 May 1852 – 26 January 1932) was a South African financier, mining magnate, benefactor and patron of the arts.

He received his early schooling in Nuremberg.

== Mining career ==
Michaelis first arrived in South Africa in 1876 when he landed at Port Elizabeth. Two years later he moved to Kimberley, drawn by the 1871 discovery of diamonds and the prospect of wealth. Here he became a close business associate of Julius Wernher and Alfred Beit, and got to know Hermann Eckstein and Jim B. Taylor – friendships that were to last a lifetime. He was co-opted by Wernher to deal in diamonds for Porges and Wernher, and in the 1880s restructured the Cape Diamond Company. He was a founding partner of Wernher, Beit & Co. Within some years he became manager of the Central Mining and Investment Corporation in Johannesburg.

From 1896 he worked at the corporation's offices in London and remained there until 1919, when he returned to South Africa. In England he led an extremely secluded life on the country estate, Tandridge Court in Surrey. Unlike the other Randlords, he was not given to lavish entertaining and spending, avoided the press, did not have an opulent London mansion and despite desiring a baronetcy, was not socially ambitious.

== Later life ==
With the outbreak of World War I and the anti-German hysteria that gripped England, Michaelis acted on a suggestion by General Smuts that he return to South Africa. Michaelis and his wife arrived in Cape Town in 1919. In December of that year a grand civic reception for 2,000 guests was given in his honour. They went on to have two children, Cecil and Iris Michaelis.

=== Philanthropy and art ===
In 1913 he presented a collection of Dutch and Flemish old masters to the Union government, a gift leading to his being knighted. These formed the basis of the Michaelis Collection and were housed in the Old Town House in Cape Town. The decision to house the collection in Cape Town came in for a great deal of criticism. Public sentiment at the time was that the money had originated from the Reef gold mines and that the collection belonged in Johannesburg. Also, a lot of the works were regarded as being of indifferent quality (Portrait of a Woman by Frans Hals being the cynosure of the collection) and there was at least one painting of questionable attribution. These works had been collected by Lady Phillips (wife of Sir Lionel Phillips, Bt) and Sir Hugh Lane.

In June 1920 at the urging of Lady Phillips, Michaelis endowed the chair of Fine Art at the University of Cape Town and in return was rewarded with an honorary LL.D. The school now bears his name, the Michaelis School of Fine Art. He also donated a large number of art works to museums in Kimberley and Johannesburg.

In the 1924 Birthday Honours Michaelis was appointed a Knight Commander of the Order of St Michael and St George (KCMG).

He died of cancer at Bellariastraße 7 in Zürich on 26 January 1932.

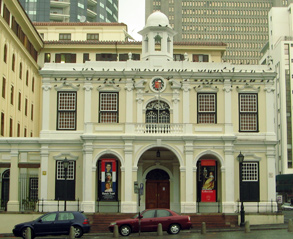
The Old Town House where the Michaelis Collection is exhibited. Cape Town, 2008.

Lady Michaelis, who returned to England on the death of Max Michaelis, presented large collections of art to the National Art Gallery in Cape Town and to Pretoria, with further gifts to the Michaelis Collection in Cape Town. She was the founder of the Lady Michaelis Orthopaedic Home in Cape Town. Moses Kottler created a bronze bust of Sir Max, which was placed in the garden of the Old Town House in Cape Town.

In 1920, Max Michaelis had acquired the Montebello estate in Newlands. Before his death in 1996, his son Cecil Michaelis, the artist, resenting government expropriation of the estate, donated Montebello to the University of Cape Town on condition the estate was used to promote design – this is now known as the Montebello Design Centre and the old residence as Michaelis House, the junior boarding house of the South African College Schools.

== Gallery ==
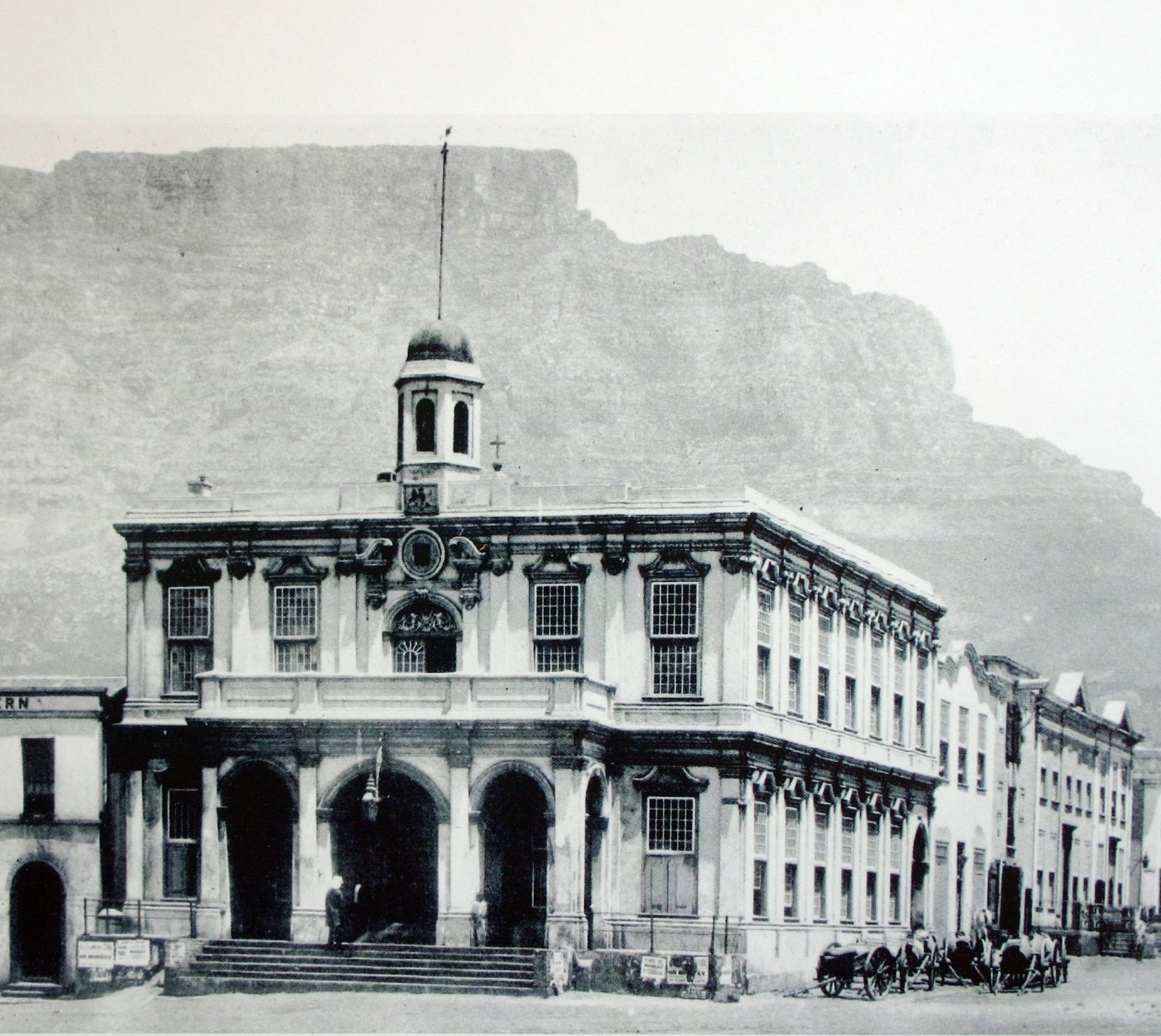
Old Town House, Cape Town in 1878

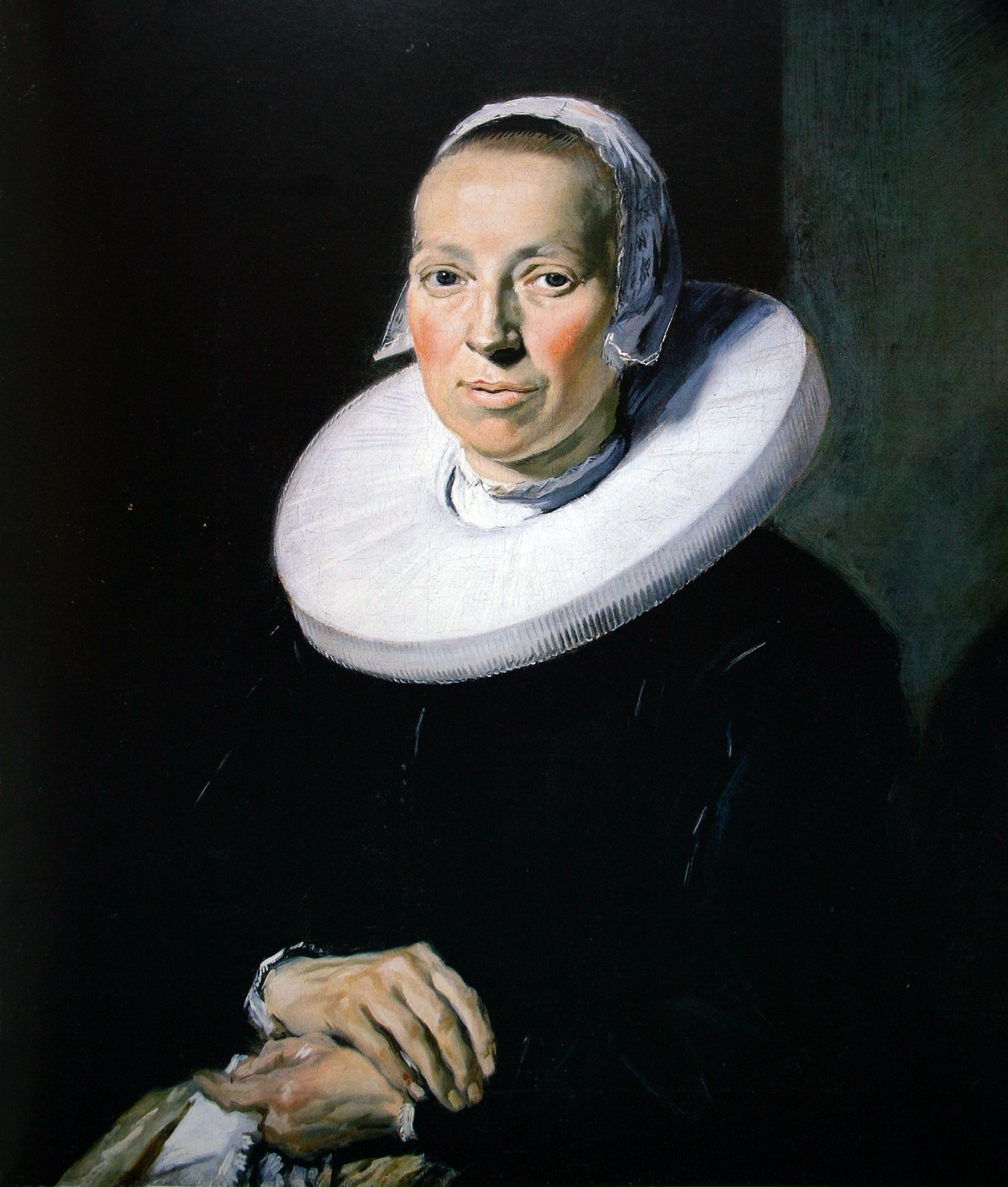
Portrait of a Woman
by Frans Hals

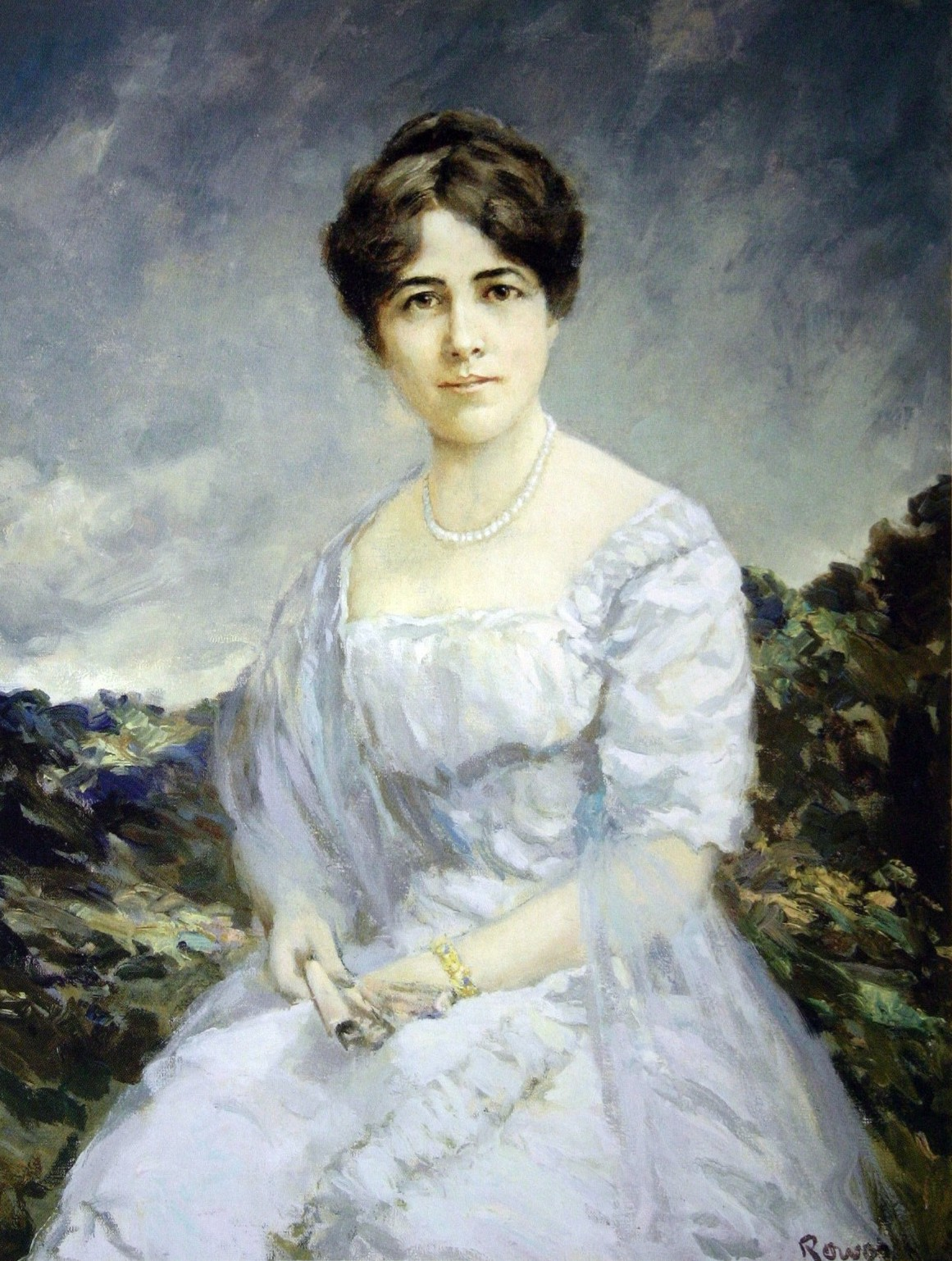
Lady Michaelis
by Edward Roworth
