= John Bauer (potter) =

South African ceramic artist

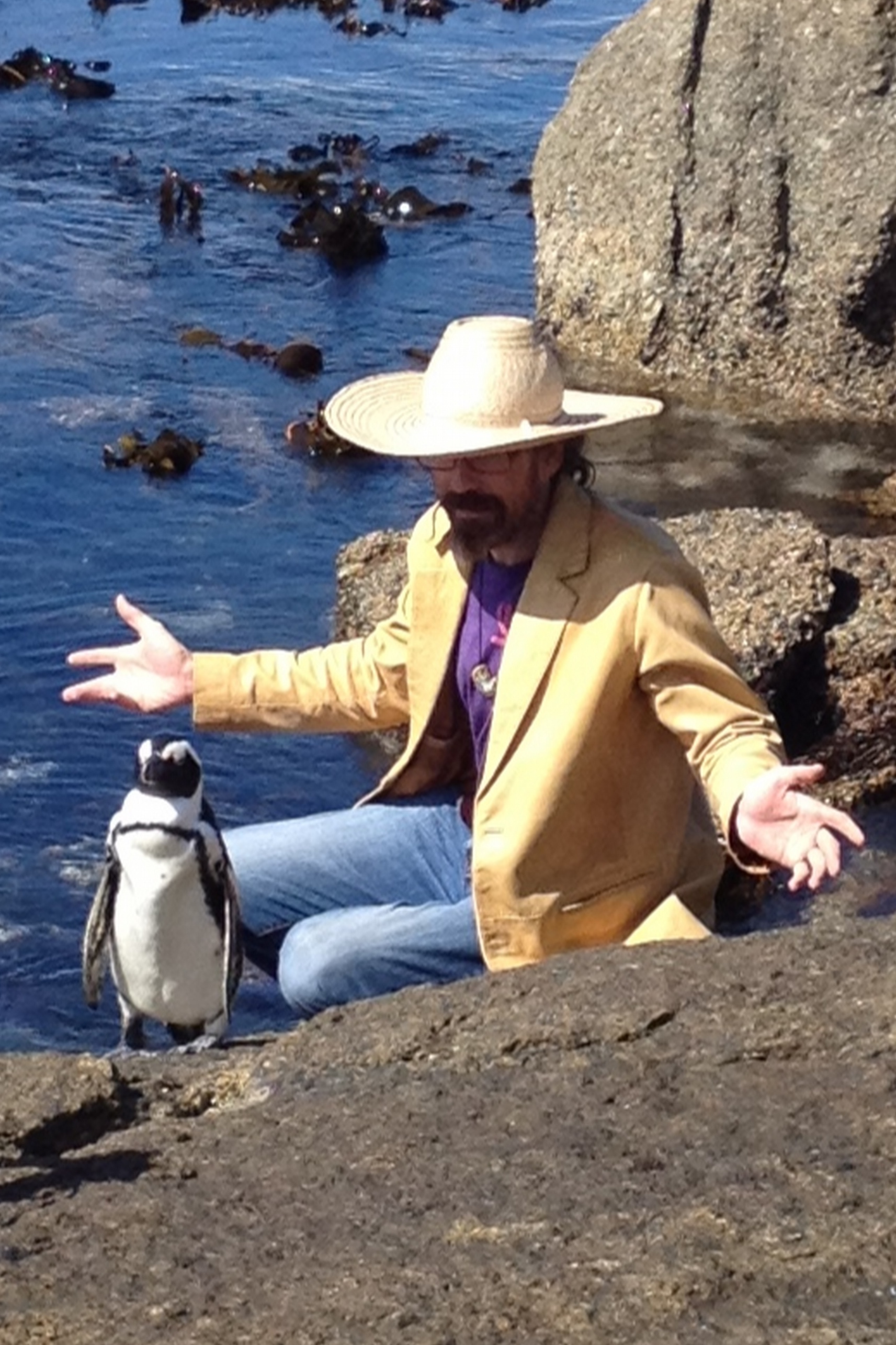
- Bauer on Boulders Beach, Simonstown, South Africa.
- Born: John Bauer; 6 January 1978 (age 48); Port Elizabeth, South Africa
- Known for: Ceramic art, installation art, painting

John Bauer (born 6 January 1978) is a South African ceramist known for his contributions to Ceramic art. He resides in Muizenberg and operates a studio at the Montebello Design Centre in Newlands, Cape Town.

== Early life ==
John Bauer was born in Port Elizabeth, Eastern Cape, to a middle-class family. Tragically, in 1983, his mother and grandmother were killed in a car accident involving a drunk driver. Later in his early twenties, his surviving grandmother was murdered, which deeply influenced his artistic work.

In 1985, Bauer's family relocated to Newlands, Cape Town, to start anew. He attended Westerford High School, where his dyslexia went undiagnosed, leading to academic challenges that made him averse to reading. At the age of thirteen, Bauer discovered his passion for pottery, which would shape his future career.

== Career and influences ==
Bauer's commitment to pottery led him to study with local potters despite initial financial struggles. He explored various aspects of porcelain, experimenting with clay compositions, molding techniques, glazes, and coloring agents. His work is influenced by Imperial Chinese porcelains of the Song dynasty (960–1,279). Bauer's research led to the development of a unique process for incised ornamentation, increasing his production capacity.

One of Bauer's notable creations is a collection of over 4,000 small porcelain bowls produced from 2000 to 2004. These bowls feature intricate low-relief, incised decorations, exploring themes of love, loneliness, and the pursuit of happiness. While often whimsical, they also touch on profound subjects, including bereavement and the role of providence.

In addition to his bowls, Bauer diversified his artistic repertoire, creating plaques, tiles, and bowls that simulated basketry, knitwear, and textiles. His sources of inspiration range from lace and crochet to oriental lacquer and relief ornamentation found on various objects.

Bauer's work honors traditional hand skills and folk art, celebrating the craftsmanship of the pre-industrial era. He particularly acknowledges women who crafted objects to enhance domestic life and explores themes related to the 'eternal feminine' and the redemptive power of love in his art.

John Bauer's artistic achievements include being recognized as an Emerging Creative at Design Indaba 2009. His work has been featured in exhibitions, including a retrospective at the South African Museum in 2012. His art is part of collections at the Slave Lodge in Cape Town and the William Humphreys Art Gallery in Kimberley.
