= South African College Schools =

Coordinates: 33°58′13.45″S 18°27′36.38″E

South African College Schools (SACS)

Location
- Newlands Avenue (High School); Dean Street (Junior School); Newlands; Southern Suburbs; Cape Town, Western Cape, 7700; South Africa

Information
- School type: All-boys public school
- Motto: Spectemur agendo (Let us be judged by our deeds)
- Established: 1 October 1829; 197 years ago
- Headmaster: Brendan Grant (High School); Gary Skeeles (Junior School)
- Grades: R–12
- Gender: Male
- Colours: Gold (#D9AD2B); Navy (#00174D); White
- Song: The S.A.C.
- Fight song: 'S.A. College S.A. College, Woah'
- Nickname: SACS
- Rivals: Bishops Diocesan College; Rondebosch Boys' High School; Wynberg Boys' High School
- Accreditation: National Senior Certificate; GCE A-levels; IGCSEs
- Website: sacollege.org.za sacsrugby.com (Rugby)

The South African College Schools, colloquially known as SACS, is a public English medium primary and high education institution situated in Newlands – part of the Southern Suburbs region of Cape Town in the Western Cape province of South Africa. Founded in 1829, it is one of the oldest continuously-run schools in South Africa.

SACS is one of four schools expressly endowed by Cecil John Rhodes to offer an annual Rhodes Scholarship to one of their graduating students.

== History ==
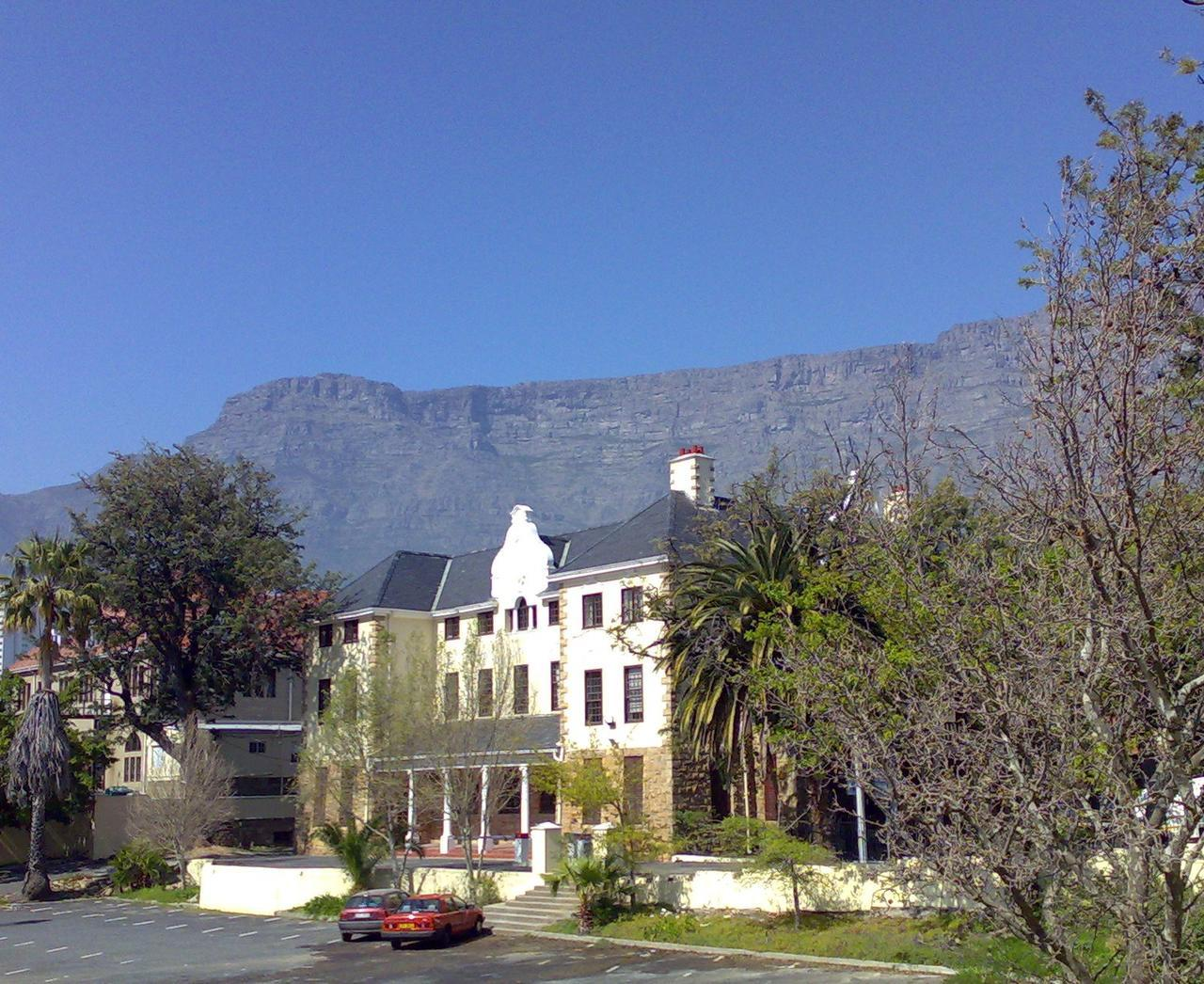
Rosedale House (former)

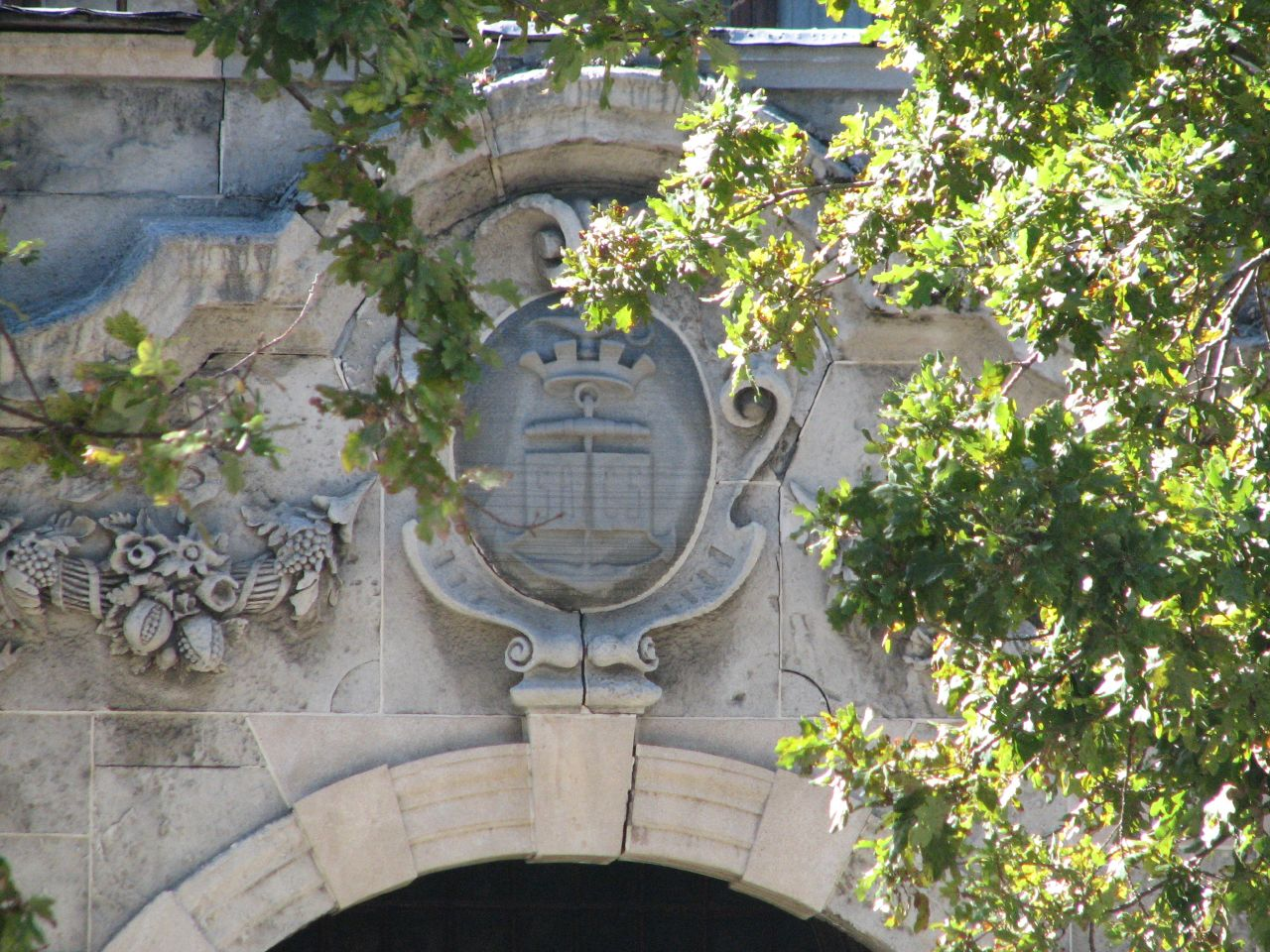
SACS Badge

The concept of the South African College was formed in 1791 when the Dutch Commissioner-General, Jacob Abraham Uitenhage de Mist, asked for funding to be set aside to improve schooling in the Cape. After the British took control of the Cape Colony, the second colonial governor – Lord Charles Henry Somerset PC - gave permission for the funds reserved by De Mist to be used to establish the South African College in 1814.

The founding committee met in the Groote Kerk to discuss funding and accommodation for the school, and – on 1 October 1829 – the inauguration of the South African College was held and classes began. The original location of the school was in the Weeshuis on Long Street. The school moved to what is now known as the Egyptian Building in the Gardens district of Cape Town in 1841.

It was decided in 1874 that the younger students should be separated from their older counterparts. The South African College was separated into the College which became the University of Cape Town and the College School.

In 1896, the College School moved to its own building on Orange Street, separate from the college. For the next few decades, the school grew and the building became too small for the number of students attending.

In 1959, the school moved to its current home on the Montebello Estate in Newlands, former home of the mining magnate Sir Max Michaelis, after negotiations spanning a decade with the Cape Administration.

In 2012, the school grounds were used to film Spud 2: The Madness Continues.

== School buildings ==
The current school buildings are situated along Dean Street and Newlands Avenue in Cape Town.

The Junior School is located along Dean Street and is equipped with numerous fields for sporting activities, of which some are shared with the High School. The Junior School has a full-length swimming pool, with a smaller children's pool for the younger students. A number of tennis courts are also available to the students. The Junior School has a Media Centre which hosts computer facilities, a library and classrooms. The music department has its own auditorium for cultural events and is also used for events with smaller audiences. The Junior School's boarding house is named after J. E. De Villiers.

The High School is closest to Newlands Avenue and also hosts a number of sports fields for the various sports which the school offers throughout the year. The swimming pool is mainly used for Water Polo, and is also heated to facilitate training and usage in winter. The High School has a Media Centre with air-conditioned computer labs and library. The school hall is named after one of the School's most famous students, Jan Hendrik Hofmeyr. The boarding houses for the High School are Michaelis House (for the junior students) and Rosedale House (for the senior students).

== High school sports ==
SACS offers a wide variety of summer and winter sports for boys to partake in throughout the year. Boys are required to partake in at least one main summer and winter sport, and may also partake in other secondary sports (provided they are involved in a main sport first).

- Main summer sports
  - Cricket
  - Swimming
  - Water polo
  - rowing
  - Tennis
  - Basketball
  - Athletics
  - Mountain biking
- Secondary summer sports
  - Sailing
- Main winter sports
  - Rugby union
  - Hockey
  - Cross-country
  - Squash
  - Mountain biking
- Secondary winter sports
  - Bodyboarding
  - Golf
  - Surfing

== High school clubs and societies ==
Clubs, societies and bands are available at the high school. As of 2022, there were the following active clubs, societies and bands operating at SACS:

- History Society
- Marimba Band
- Choir
- Piano Legends
- Big Band
- Junior Jazz Band
- Concert and Marching bands
- Clarinet Ensemble
- Flute Ensemble
- Brass Ensemble
- Saxophone Ensemble
- Tentet
- Rock Band
- Muslim Students' Association
- Christian Union
- Science Club
- Representative Council of Learners (RCL)
- Interact Society
- Photography Society
- First Aid Society
- Multimedia Society
- Film Society
- Chess Club
- Maths Club
- Debating Society
- Pride Society
- Wheel Chair Club
- African Society
- Waterpolo Table Society
- Rugby Refereeing Society
- Drama Society
- Coin and Metal Collecting Society
- Projector Alignment Society (Inactive)

== Uniform ==
The traditional school colour of navy blue was determined in the 1880s when SACS pupils purchased the only pattern available of alternating white, light- and dark-blue horizontal stripes from Porter Hodgson's Outfitters in Cape Town. Prior to this, the pupils wore what they could afford, while still being presentable.

Today, the High School uniform consists of a summer and winter uniform. During summer, boys wear khaki shorts with long khaki socks and brown shoes. In winter, the basic uniform consists of long charcoal trousers, black socks and black shoes. Both the summer and winter uniforms are accompanied by the SACS navy-blue blazer, white school shirt and school tie. Both these uniforms can be worn at any time during the school year, except for certain formal school functions, where a specific uniform is required.

The Junior School uniform consists of a white shirt, charcoal shorts, a SACS Junior belt, charcoal socks with thin light and dark blue stripes at the top, black shoes and the Junior School tie, which is similar to the High School tie, apart from one minor difference. The Junior School uniform includes the same blazer as the High School, with the difference that the Junior School does not modify blazers for Blues (colours) awards, as at the High School.

== Rhodes Scholarship ==
When Cecil John Rhodes died in 1902, he specifically endowed the South African College in his will as one of four schools in the Cape Colony where the Rhodes Scholarship would be awarded on an annual basis to a former student to study at the University of Oxford.

== Notable Old Boys of SACS ==
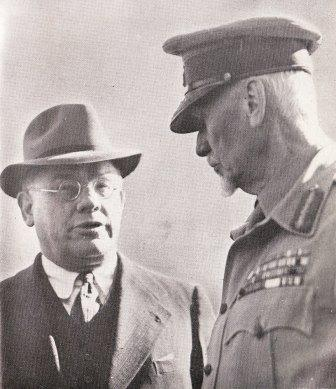
Jan Hendrik Hofmeyr and former Prime Minister of South Africa, Jan Smuts

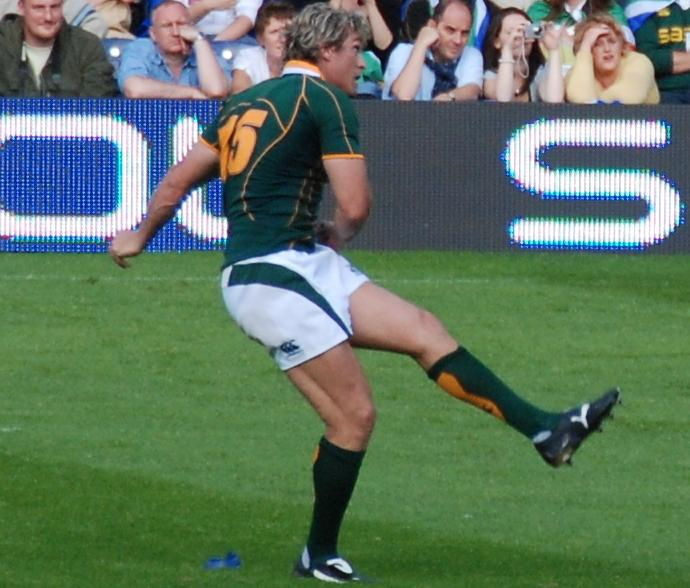
Percy Montgomery

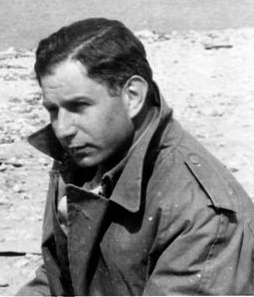
Solly Zuckerman, Baron Zuckerman

- Dr. Abdullah Abdurahman – doctor, Cape Muslim leader, founder of the anti-apartheid movement African People's Organisation and human rights campaigner.
- Captain Andrew Beauchamp-Proctor VC, DSO, MC and Bar, DFC
- Kyle Brown – former South Africa Sevens captain and 2016 Summer Olympic Games medallist.
- Benjamin Duff – Springbok rugby player
- Abraham Fischer – Sole Prime Minister of the Orange River Colony in South Africa
- Rob Herring – rugby union hooker for Ulster and Ireland.
- Gino Lupini – former Italian Rugby player, author and political educationist.
- Leonard Hoffmann, Baron Hoffmann PC – former senior British judge
- Jan Hendrik Hofmeyr – former Deputy Prime Minister of South Africa, Minister of Finance and Education, Administrator of the Transvaal and Rhodes Scholar
- Peter Kirsten – former South African cricketer
- Sihle Lonzi - South African politician, member of parliament for the Economic Freedom Fighters
- Nicolaas Petrus van Wyk Louw – Afrikaans-language poet, playwright and scholar
- William Ewart Gladstone van Wyk Louw – Afrikaans-language poet
- Percival Colin "Percy" Montgomery – former South African rugby union footballer, 2007 Rugby World Cup winner and the first Springbok to earn 100 caps.
- Dr. Cecil Moss – former South African rugby union player and South African Rugby Union coach
- Sir Allan Mossop – Chief Judge of the British Supreme Court for China
- Sebastien Rousseau – Three time Olympian Swimmer for South Africa, Commonwealth Games Medalist, South African Record Holder.
- Albie Sachs – former justice of the Constitutional Court of South Africa
- Ryan Sandes – ultramarathon trail runner, who has won all four of the 4 Deserts races, amongst other achievements.
- Simon Walker – British business executive, government adviser and Director General of the UK's Institute of Directors
- Solly Zuckerman, Baron Zuckerman OM, KCB, FRS – British zoologist, public servant and key World War II Allied strategic adviser
- Dr Joseph Ozinsky – Anaesthetist who gave anaesthesia for the first heart transplant at Groote Schuur Hospital 1967, working with Dr Cecil Moss (above).
- Dane Piedt – South African cricket player, 2014 to present, more than 300 caps.
