= Hoërskool Bellville =

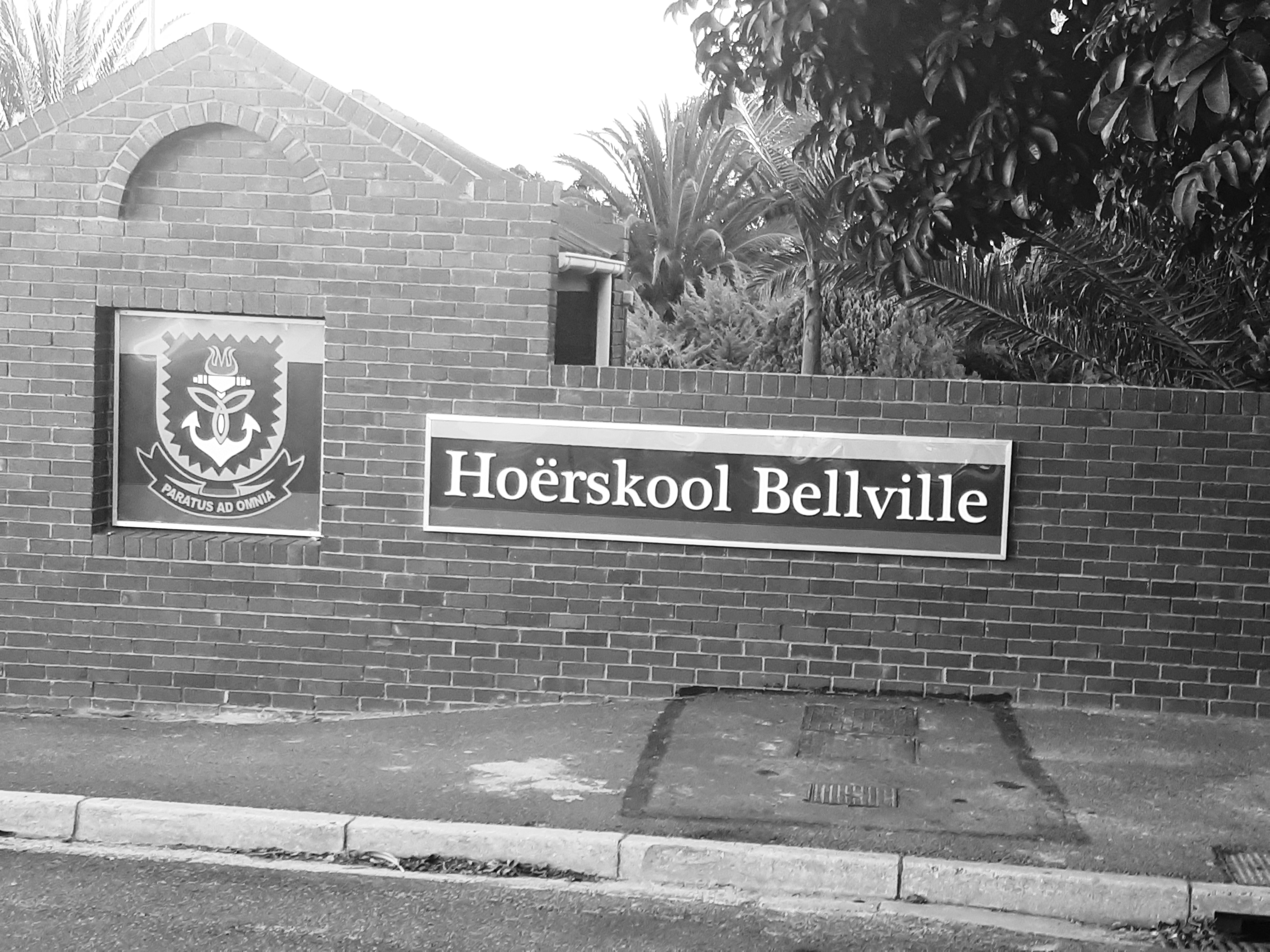
- Hoërskool Bellville in 2018

Location
- 17 de la Haye Avenue; Bellville, Western Cape; South Africa; 33°53′34.23″S 18°38′55.06″E

Information
- School type: Public school
- Motto: Paratus Ad Omnia (translated: "Be ready for all")
- Religious affiliation: Christianity
- Established: 25 January 1937; 89 years ago
- School district: District 4
- Principal: T. Mc Geer
- Staff: 100 full-time
- Grades: 8–12
- Gender: Boys & Girls
- Age: 14 to 18
- Average class size: 28
- Language: Afrikaans
- Schedule: 07:40 - 14:30
- Classrooms: 60
- Campus: Urban Campus
- Campus type: Suburban
- Colours: Gold; Maroon; Navy; White
- Nickname: Bellville
- Rival: DF Akademie; Hoërskool Stellenberg; Hoërskool Tygerberg
- Accreditation: Western Cape Education Department
- Newspaper: Sapiens
- School fees: R3750 per month
- Feeder schools: Laerskool Bastion; Laerskool Bellville; Laerskool Bellpark; Laerskool Bellville-Noord
- Alumni: Hennie Bosman; Dawie de Villiers
- Website: http://www.hsbellville.co.za

Hoërskool Bellville (Bellville High School) is a public Afrikaans medium co-educational high school situated in Bellville in the Western Cape province of South Africa, It is one of the top schools in the Western Cape province, It was founded in 1937.

== Background ==
The school was established in 1937.

== Headmasters ==
The school had the following principals: C.J. Grové 1937- 1949, R. Coetzee –1949-1970, D.L. van den Berg 1971- 1973, G.F.P. Kellerman 1974–1983, C.E. van Staden 1983–1985, A.C. Lombard 1986- 1996, J.P. Crous 1997- 2010, D. du Plessis 2011 - 2024, and currently T. Mc Geer.

== Athletics ==
Hoërskool Bellville annually participates in the MTBS athletics competition, along with three other schools from the Bellville area: DF Akademie, Tygerberg and Stellenberg. MTBS is especially well known for the performance of these schools' non-participating pupils on the pavilion as they perform songs and cheers to encourage their athletes during the day - for which a trophy is also awarded. Bellville has won this singing section in 2003, 2004, 2006, 2008 and 2019.

== Other events ==
In 2006 the school's team won the national SAGE competition in entrepreneurship when they made and sold items from pillow cases to tissue boxes. The final was in China and despite the contestants parents sometimes being unemployed the team of six flew off to compete after sponsorship was identified by minister Tasneem Essop.

The school also participates in a yearly Interschools event (week long derby) with its local rival DF Akademie, in which the schools contest on most platforms - including Field hockey, Rugby, Netball, Cross country, Chess and Debate. The first team rugby, hockey and netball matches are the main events. In 2017, the school produced Janke van Dyk, the top achieving matriculant in South Africa.

== Alumni ==
Gene Louw, politician and cabinet minister. († 2015)

Dawie de Villiers, Springbok rugby player - scrumhalf and captain, preacher, ambassador in London, Minister of Trade and Industry. († 2022)

Hennie Bosman, karate expert and stunt man.

Carlü Sadie, Lions Rugby Union player - prop, represented South Africa U20 in 2016 and 2017 in the Junior Rugby World Cup.

Francois van Coke, lead vocalist in the band Fokofpolisiekar and Van Coke Kartel, and solo artist.

Janke van Dyk, the top achieving matriculant in South Africa in 2017.
