= Forgive Them For They Know Not What They Do =

Compilation album by Fokofpolisiekar
- Released: 2009
- Genre: Alternative Rock
- Length: 60:30
- Labels: Rhythm Records; Punkskelm Records

Fokofpolisiekar compilation chronology
Forgive Them For They; Know Not What They Do (2009)	Fokofpolisiekar 10 Year Anniversary (2012)

Forgive Them For They Know Not What They Do is Fokofpolisiekar's first compilation album. It was released in 2009.

The title is a quote from the Bible said by Jesus in Luke 23:34.

== Track listing ==
No.	Title	Released On	Length
1.	"Fokofpolisiekar"	As Jy Met Vuur Speel Sal Jy Brand	2:37
2.	"As Jy Met Vuur Speel Sal Jy Brand"	As Jy Met Vuur Speel Sal Jy Brand	2:24
3.	"Maak Of Braak"	As Jy Met Vuur Speel Sal Jy Brand	2:24
4.	"Tygerberg Vliegtuig"	As Jy Met Vuur Speel Sal Jy Brand	2:51
5.	"Sporadies Nomadies"	Lugsteuring	3:56
6.	"Hemel Op Die Platteland"	As Jy Met Vuur Speel Sal Jy Brand	2:39
7.	"Die Grootste Gaping"	Lugsteuring	4:13
8.	"Bid Vir My"	Lugsteuring	3:18
9.	"Vernietig Jouself"	As Jy Met Vuur Speel Sal Jy Brand	1:58
10.	"Monoloog In Stereo"	Monoloog in Stereo	4:01
11.	"Vasbeslote Korporasie"	Swanesang	3:48
12.	"Lugsteuring"	Lugsteuring	3:51
13.	"Tevrede?"	Lugsteuring	4:18
14.	"Die Illusie Van Veilgheid"	Monoloog in Stereo	4:13
15.	"Brand Suid-Afrika"	Swanesang	3:20
16.	"Antibiotika"	Antibiotika	2:50
17.	"Wintersdag By Die Seer"	Monoloog in Stereo	4:01
18.	"Ek Skyn (Heilig)"	Swanesang	3:48
Total length:			60:30
