= DF Akademie =

High School in Bellville, Western Cape, South Africa

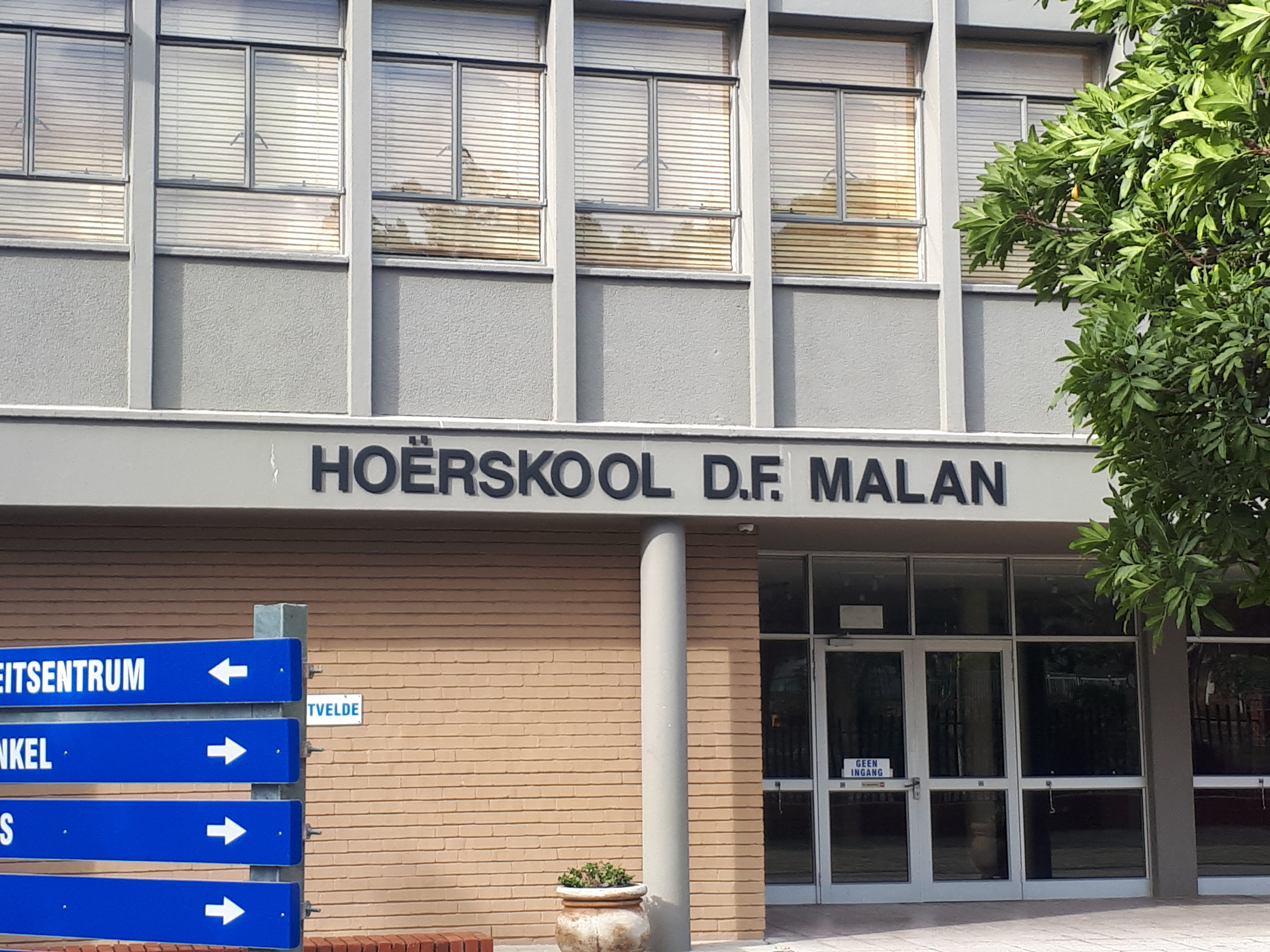
- Hoërskool D.F. Malan prior to being renamed to DF Akademie

Location
- Frans Conradie Drive, Boston; Bellville, Western Cape; South Africa; 33.8936°S 18.6265°E

Information
- Former names: Bellville Sekondêre Skool (1953); Hoërskool DF Malan (1953–2026)
- School type: Public Semi-Private
- Motto: Vir jou Suid-Afrika (For you South Africa)
- Religious affiliation: Christianity
- Established: 1954; 72 years ago
- School district: District 4
- Principal: Hannes Oosthuizen
- Deputy principals: Stiaan Dippenaar (Staff affairs); Nicolette Solomon (Learner affairs)
- Staff: 100 full-time
- Grades: 8–12
- Gender: Boys & Girls
- Age: 14 to 18
- Schedule: 07:45-14:10
- Campus: Urban Campus
- Campus type: Suburban
- Colours: Yellow; Blue; White
- Slogan: Akademie is ons besigheid ("Education is our business")
- Nickname: DF
- Rivals: Hoërskool Bellville; Hoërskool Stellenberg; Hoërskool Tygerberg
- Accreditation: Western Cape Education Department
- Newspaper: Die Herout
- Feeder schools: Laerskool Kenridge; Laerskool Panorama; Laerskool Totius; Laerskool Welgemoed; Parow East Primary School; Vredelust Primary School; Laerskool De Tyger
- Alumni: Werner Greeff; H.Kennedy; P. Greeff; Eduard Greyling; Loki Rothman; Marais Erasmus; Frikkie Kancho; Margot Rothman; Juvan Coetzee; Johnny de Ridder
- Honours: Part of 100 schools included in The Cambridge University Student Guide to Excellence: 2012 and 2013
- Website: DF Akademie official website

DF Akademie (formerly Hoërskool D.F. Malan) is a public Afrikaans medium co-educational high school situated in Boston, a suburb of Cape Town's Bellville suburb in the Western Cape province of South Africa. In 2012 and 2013, the school was included in The Cambridge University Student Guide to Excellence, a selection of 100 top schools worldwide. In recent years, it has been one of the academically top-performing schools in the Western Cape.

== History ==
The school was established in 1951. D. Brink was the first principal up to 1969. He was followed by E. Smit (1970–1977), H. Franzen (1978–1986), C. de Jager (1986–1988), B. Volschenk (1989–1996), R Truter (1996–2007), Joe Dorfling (2007–2016), Sias Conradie (2017–2025) and currently Hannes Oosthuizen.

The school was initially named Hoërskool D.F. Malan after the Prime Minister of South Africa from 1948 to 1954. Objections to the school's name commemorating Malan, known as one of the "architects of apartheid", led the school's governing body to initiate a process to change the name, and a vote in 2021 supported a change to "DF Akademie". The name change was challenged in court, but in June 2025 the Supreme Court of Appeal dismissed the challenge and the new name became official in 2026.

== Music scene ==
DF Akademie is also notable for producing several famous musicians on the local South African music scene, such as Pierre Greeff and Hunter Kennedy. Consequently, many local bands including aKing, Foto na Dans, Jax Panik, Lukraaketaar, Die Heuwels Fantasties and Frik13 are associated with the school. This, along with the fact that other similar musicians attended neighbour school Bellville High School, has led to the Bellville area, in which these schools are situated, earning the nickname "Bellville Rock City". Musician Loki Rothman, who attended the school, reached the final of SA's Got Talent in 2009 while still a senior in the school, and the founding members of Cape Town alt-pop duo EMERGER, Emma de Goede and Gerrit "Gerry" Matthee, also attended the school. Their debut single "Break & Fall" was a winner of the international Avid and Abbey Road Studios Song Contest and they were featured as Apple Music's New Artist Spotlight in July 2018.

== Alumni ==
Other notable alumni include former Springbok rugby player Werner Greeff, international cricket umpire Marais Erasmus, ballet dancer Eduard Greyling and a former dean of Engineering at the University of Stellenbosch, Prof. Arnold Schoonwinkel. Actors Leigh Wakeford, Albert Maritz and 7de Laan duo Chris Vorster and Corné Crous all attended the school.

== Sister School ==
DF Akademie has a sister-school in Kortrijk, Belgium and some of the students from these schools usually visit each other yearly.

== Athletics ==
DF Akademie annually participates in the DTBS athletics competition (known as MTBS prior to DF Akademie's name change), along with three other schools from the Bellville area: Tygerberg High School, Bellville High School and Stellenberg High School. DTBS is especially well known for the performance of these schools' non-athlete pupils on the pavilion, as they perform songs, cheers and dances, as well as choreographed visual displays known as "flashes" to encourage their athletes during the day. A trophy is also awarded for best spirit on the pavillion and best flashes. DF Akademie has thus far been the second most successful school in the flashes trophy, winning it two times fewer than Stellenberg High School. It is in the athletics, however, where the school achieved unprecedented success, winning the trophy all but three times in the first 19 years of the competition.

== Other events ==
The school also participates in a yearly Interschools event (week-long derby) with its local rival Bellville High School, during which the schools contest on most platforms, including rugby, field hockey, netball, cross country, chess, debate, mountain biking and, from 2013 onwards, EA Sports FIFA. The first-team rugby, hockey and netball matches are the main events. In recent years Bellville High School has strongly dominated the rugby while DF Akademie dominated both boys' and girls' hockey.
