= Tygerberg High School =

Hoërskool Tygerberg
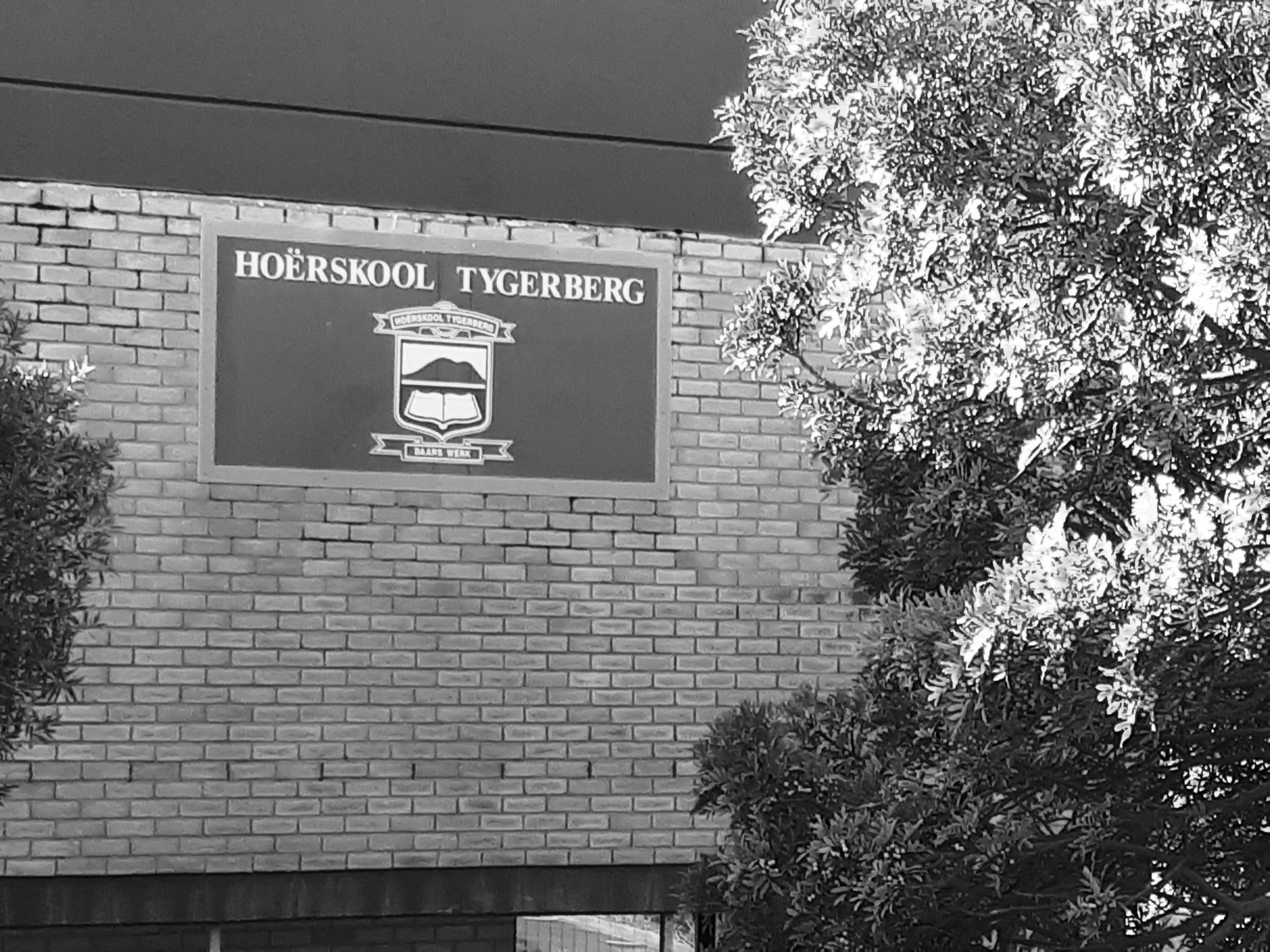
- Hoërskool Tygerberg 2018

Location
- Fairfield Street; 5 Fairfield St, De Tijger, Cape Town, 7500; Parow; Cape Town, Western Cape, 7505; South Africa
- Coordinates: 33.8933°S 18.5944°E

Information
- School type: Government funded, Public school
- Motto: DAAR’S ‘N NASIE TE LEI, DAAR’S ‘N STRYD TE STRY, DAAR’S WERK! (THERE'S A NATION TO LEAD, THERE'S A BATTLE TO FIGHT, THERE'S WORK!)
- Established: 1954; 72 years ago
- School district: District 4
- School number: 021 939 2023
- Principal: Dr L.S. Herselman
- Teaching staff: 50
- Grades: 8–12
- Gender: Males and Females
- Age range: 14-19
- Classes offered: English (Home Language or First Additional Language) Afrikaans (Home Language or First Additional Language) Mathematics Mathematics Literacy (grade 10-12) Life Orientation Creative Arts Dramatic Arts (grade 8-9) Music Natural Sciences (grade 8-9) Life Sciences (grade 10-12) Physical Sciences (grade10-12) Economics and Management Sciences (grade 8-9) Accounting (grade 10-12) Business Studies (grade 10-12) Economics (grade 10-12) Tourism (grade 10-12) History (grade 10-12) Social Sciences (grade 8-9) Computers Application Technology (grade 10-12) Information Technology (grade 10-12) German (Second Additional Language) Consumer Studies (grade 10-12) Technology (grade 8-9) Engineering Graphics & Design (grade 10-12)
- Language: Afrikaans and English
- Hours in school day: 08:00-14:30
- Classrooms: 49
- Campus type: Urban Campus
- Colors: Green, Gray, White
- Slogan: There’s work
- Song: Waar die Tygerberg steeds waghou staan die skool wat ons bemin. Daar ontvang ons voorbereiding voor die lewensstryd begin. We work hard there with our hands, we play, we learn, we grow. Till our gifts and all our talents come to bloom, all that we sow. Aan ons skool sal ons getrou bly, aan ons land en volk en kerk. Met ons leuse tot besieling, Kom dan maats, daar’s stryd, daar’s werk! To our school we shall be true, to our people and our Lord. With our motto as inspiration: Come everyone, let’s strive, let’s work!
- Athletics: Yes
- Sports: Yes
- Mascot: Tiger & Tigress
- Nickname: Tiere
- Rivals: Hoërskool Bellville; DF Akademie; Hoërskool Stellenberg
- Accreditation: Western Cape Education Department
- Newspaper: The Roar
- Alumni: Rochelle Lawson; Eben Etzebeth; Justin Geduld; Juarno Augustus
- Website: www.hstygerberg.co.za

Hoërskool Tygerberg is a public Afrikaans-English medium co-educational high school situated in Parow in the Western Cape province of South Africa. It is a government-funded school, established in 1954.

== Background and history ==
The school was founded in 1954. The first principal was M. du T. Potgieter.

== Motto ==
There is work.

== Through the years ==
Potgieter served as principal up to 1963. D.A. Kotzé took over for one year. After Kotzé, the school had numerous principals: R.K. de Villiers 1964–1967, S.W. Walters 1968–1972, J.A. de Jager 1973–1975, J.A. van Wyk 1976–1984, F.P.J. Smit 1985–1990, J.A. de Vries 1991–1993, A.J.C. Schreuder 1994–1997 and C.E. van der Westhuizen 1997–2011. L.S. Herselman, who started in 2012-2024.

== Improvements ==
The schools new buildings were opened on 7 August 1981.

== Language ==
The language medium is Afrikaans and English.

== Choir ==
The Tygerberg High School Choir took part in the 35th World International Youth Music Competition in Vienna, Austria. The choir won the second place prize.

== Athletics ==
They represent the "T" in the MTBS annual interschool's athletics competition. The other school participating are "M" for DF Akademie (formerly DF Malan), "B" for Bellville and "S" for Stellenberg.

== Alumni ==
- François Bloemhof – Author
- Rochelle Lawson – South Africa Protea Netball Player (Goal Defence)
- Eben Etzebeth – Springbok Rugby Player (Lock and Captain)
- Justin Geduld – South Africa sevens rugby player.
- James Kriel – Head of the South African Airforce
- Juarno Augustus – Western Province rugby player, playing eighthman.
- Marvin Orie – Springbok rugby player
- Faffa Knoetze – Springbok rugby player
- Travis Ismaiel - Springbok Rugby Player
