= Wilder as die Wildtuin =

Studio album by Die Heuwels Fantasties
- Released: 11 March 2011
- Length: 58:03
- Label: Supra Familias

Die Heuwels Fantasties chronology
Die Heuwels Fantasties (2009)	Wilder as die Wildtuin (2011)	Alles Wat Mal Is (2012)

Wilder as die Wildtuin is the second album from South African electronic rock group Die Heuwels Fantasties, released in 2011 by Supra Familias in South Africa.

== Track listing ==
No.	Title	Length
1.	"Wilder as die Wildtuin"	3:50
2.	"Buitenste Ruim"	4:25
3.	"Verlore Stilte"	4:57
4.	"Heel Te Mal"	3:54
5.	"Waar die Hel Uitkom (feat. Adriaan Brand)"	4:09
6.	"In en Uit"	3:51
7.	"Verwag My Terug (feat. Ryk Benadé)"	4:13
8.	"Nog 'n Jaar"	4:37
9.	"Modus Operandi (feat. Inge Beckmann)"	4:13
10.	"Los My Uit (feat. Francois Van Coke)"	3:04
11.	"Wind en Weer"	2:36
12.	"Mangemaak (feat. Frieda van den Heever)"	3:28
13.	"Wonder Bo Wonder (feat. Coenie De Villiers)"	4:00
14.	"Wilder as die Wildtuin II"	6:46
Total length:		58:03
