= MTBS =

Interschools athletics competition

DTBS
- Genre: Schools athletics
- Date: February
- Venue: Cape Town stadium and Green Point Athletics Track (Athletics)
- Country: South Africa
- Years active: 32
- Founder: Frans du Toit
- Previous event: 7 February 2026
- Next event: February 2027
- Participants: 2,000 (athletes and students on pavilion)
- Attendance: 12,000 (Spectators)

DTBS (formerly MTBS) is an annual interschools athletics competition held between four high schools located in Bellville, Western Cape. It was created by the late Frans du Toit, a retired teacher from JG Meiring High School in Goodwood and a part time sports journalist. The competition is mainly an athletics meeting and includes cheerleading and flashes. These schools are: DF Akademie, Tygerberg High School, Bellville High School and Stellenberg High School. The name is a derived acronym from the names of the schools in that order. The first DTBS took place in 1994.

The flashes consist of each school showing their images while sitting on the pavilion. This performance consists of a medley of songs during which the pupils create a "human LCD screen" on the pavilion. This is achieved by the students opening and closing their school blazers at unique pre-determined moments, with each student functioning like an individual pixel and thus allowing images and animations to be displayed. Other parts of the school uniform (such as dresses and socks) may also be used, but no other props (such as cards) are allowed. Each school' adheres to a specific theme that has been chosen by that particular school. The annual attendance is an estimated 12,000 spectators. The athletics and flashes are attended by the whole community. The event receives coverage by South African newspapers Die Burger, Tygerburger and Rapport. It has also been broadcast on national television channel SABC 2. Similar events exist: most notably in South Korea. Different athletics items take place throughout the day; including short distance sprints, long distance running, hurdles shot put, javelin, long jump, discus, high jump, triple jump and relay races. Two athletes from each school take part in an event, adding up to 8 athletes in each event.

Points are rewarded as follows:

- 8th place - 1 point
- 7th Place - 2 points
- 6th place - 3 points
- 5th place - 4 points
- 4th place - 5 points
- 3rd place - 6 points
- 2nd place -7 points
- 1st place - 9 points

Awards for each age group are rewarded at the end of the day.

| | Athletics: | Flashes | Best Spirit |
|---|---|---|---|
| 1994 | DF Malan | DF Malan | |
| 1995 | DF Malan | DF Malan | |
| 1996 | Bellville | Stellenberg | |
| 1997 | Bellville | Stellenberg | |
| 1998 | DF Malan | DF Malan | |
| 1999 | DF Malan | Stellenberg | |
| 2000 | DF Malan | DF Malan | |
| 2001 | DF Malan | Stellenberg | |
| 2002 | DF Malan | DF Malan | |
| 2003 | DF Malan | Bellville | |
| 2004 | No Competition | Bellville | |
| 2005 | Tygerberg | No Competition | |
| 2006 | DF Malan | Bellville | |
| 2007 | DF Malan | DF Malan | |
| 2008 | DF Malan | Bellville | |
| 2009 | DF Malan | Stellenberg | |
| 2010 | DF Malan | Stellenberg | |
| 2011 | DF Malan | Stellenberg | |
| 2012 | DF Malan | Stellenberg | |
| 2013 | Stellenberg | Stellenberg | |
| 2014 | Stellenberg | Stellenberg | |
| 2015 | Stellenberg | No Competition | |
| 2016 | Stellenberg | No Competition | |
| 2017 | Stellenberg | DF Malan | DF Malan |
| 2018 | Stellenberg | Stellenberg | DF Malan |
| 2019 | Stellenberg | DF Malan & Bellville | DF Malan |
| 2020 | Stellenberg | DF Malan | DF Malan |
| 2021 | No Competition | No Competition | No Competition |
| 2022 | Bellville | No Competition | No Competition |
| 2023 | Stellenberg | Stellenberg | Stellenberg |
| 2024 | Stellenberg | DF Malan | No Competition |
| 2025 | Stellenberg | Stellenberg | DF Malan |
| 2026 | Stellenberg | DF Akademie | DF Akademie |

From 1994 to 2016, there were only 2 categories (Athletics and Flashes) in the competition. (excl. 2004, 2005, 2015, 2016) The Athletics cup is awarded to the school with the highest total score, according to the scoring system. The winners of the Flashes and Best Spirit categories are independently judged. If a school wins both, it is called "double gold". In 2017, the Best spirit category was added. If a school wins all three categories, it is called "triple gold".

Times won :

| School | Athletics | Flashes | Best Spirit |
|---|---|---|---|
| DF Malan | 15 | 11 | 6 |
| Stellenberg | 11 | 13 | 1 |
| Bellville | 3 | 6 | |
| Tygerberg | 1 | | |

Double gold :

| School | Times |
|---|---|
| DF Malan | 10 |
| Stellenberg | 6 |

Consecutive wins :

| School | Athletics | Flashes | Best spirt |
|---|---|---|---|
| Stellenberg | 8 | 6 | |
| DF Malan | 7 | 2 | 6 |
| Bellville | 2 | 2 | |
