= Forgive Them For They Suck K*k =

Live album by Fokofpolisiekar
- Released: 8 August 2013
- Recorded: December 2012

Forgive Them For They Suck K*k is the first live album by Punk rock band Fokofpolisiekar. It was recorded in 2012 during the band's performance at the Barnyard Theatre in the Cresta Mall, Johannesburg. The name of the DVD was chosen after Wynand Myburgh jokingly remarked that if a follow-up DVD was made to their 2009 documentary Forgive Them For They Know Not What They Do, it should be called Forgive Them For They Suck K*k; Myburgh elaborated by saying "We do not take ourselves too seriously in Fokofpolisiekar".

== Track listing ==
No.	Title	Length
1.	"Ek Dink Aan Jou"
2.	"Klipgooi Glashuis"
3.	"Wintersdag By Die Seer"
4.	"Bel Vir Middelvinger"
5.	"Vasbeslote Korporasie 1"
6.	"Vasbeslote Korporasie 2"
7.	"Monoloog In Stereo"
8.	"Die Illusie Van Veiligheid"
9.	"Tiny Town"
10.	"Brand Suid-Afrika"
11.	"Vernietig Jouself"
12.	"Hemel Op Die Platteland"
13.	"Morning Star, Durbanville"
14.	"Vir Altyd 07 November"
15.	"Tevrede"
16.	"Maak Of Braak"
17.	"Tevrede?"
18.	"Prioritiseer"
19.	"Angs Aanval"
20.	"Dag Dronk"
21.	"Antibiotika"
22.	"Kyk Noord"
23.	"Ek Skyn"
24.	"Fokofpolisiekar"
