= Antibiotika =

EP by Fokofpolisiekar
- Released: 2008
- Genre: Alternative rock
- Length: 40:16
- Label: Rhythm Records

Fokofpolisiekar chronology
Swanesang (2006)	Antibiotika (2008)	Selfmedikasie (2017)

Antibiotika is the 2008 double CD by the Afrikaans South African band Fokofpolisiekar. It contains four tracks and eight music videos of previous releases with a trailer of the upcoming Fokofpolisiekar Documentary.

== Track listing ==
No.	Title	Length
1.	"Antibiotika" (Antibiotics)	2:52
2.	"Van Weelde En Rykdom" (Of Luxuries and Riches)	3:07
3.	"Tussen Die Krake" (Between The Cracks)	3:13
4.	"Kyk Noord" (Look North)	3:01
5.	"Ek Skyn (Heilig)" (I Shine (Hypocritically))	3:48
6.	"Brand Suid-Afrika" (Burn South-Africa)	3:20
7.	"Maak Of Braak (Bonus)" (Make or Break)	2:26
8.	"Tieneraksie Einde (Bonus)" (Teen-Action Ending)	3:59

== Personnel ==
- Francois Van Coke – vocals
- Johnny de Ridder – lead guitar
- Hunter Kennedy – back-up vocals and rhythm guitar
- Wynand Myburgh – bass
- Jaco "Snakehead" Venter – drums
