= Die Heuwels Fantasties =

South African rock band

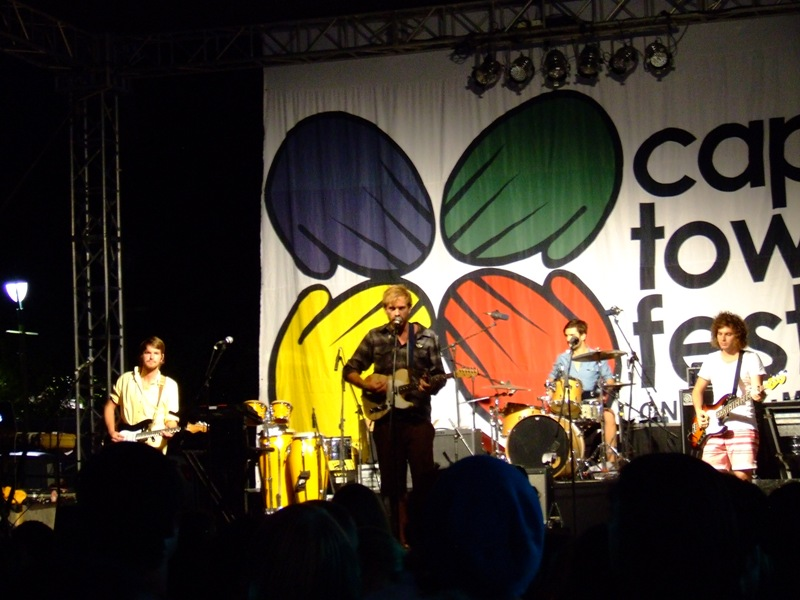
- Die Heuwels Fantasties performing in 2011

Background information
- Origin: Bellville, Western Cape, South Africa
- Genres: Rock
- Years active: 2007–present
- Label: Supra Familias
- Members: Hunter Kennedy; Pierre Greeff; Fred den Hartog; Sheldon Yoko
- Past members: Darren Rix; Leon Pienaar; Johnny de Ridder; Phillip Erasmus
- Website: dieheuwels.co.za

Die Heuwels Fantasties (English: The Hills Fantastic) is an Afrikaans rock band from Bellville, South Africa. The group is made up of Hunter Kennedy (Fokofpolisiekar, formerly of aKING), Pierre Greeff (Lukraaketaar), Fred den Hartog (Thieve), and Sheldon Yoko (Die Gevaar). As of 2022, they have released eight studio albums and four EPs, all on their own record label, Supra Familias.

== Career ==
=== Die Heuwels Fantasties: 2009–2010 ===
Die Heuwels Fantasties released their self-titled debut album on 19 March 2009. It includes contributions from Francois Van Coke (Fokofpolisiekar, Van Coke Kartel), Laudo Liebenberg (aKING), Adriaan Brand (Springbok Nude Girls), Neil Basson (Foto na Dans), and Jack Parow.

The record's publication was preceded by two singles, including "Vinger Alleen", which spent three weeks at number one on the Afrikaans television music channel MK. The track also earned the band a nomination for Best Video at the MK Awards in March 2009, without them having played a single concert.

In 2010, the group won a SAMA award in the category Best Alternative Album in Afrikaans for Die Heuwels Fantasties.

=== Wilder as die Wildtuin: 2011 ===
The band's second studio album, Wilder as die Wildtuin, was released on 11 March 2011 and included their new drummer, Phillip Erasmus.

=== Further albums: 2013–present ===
Die Heuwels Fantasties published their third studio album, Alles Wat Mal Is, in 2013. It was followed by Ja. Nee. Lekker a year later, Okay! in 2017, 2021 and HERVERBEEL in 2020, and Volume II in 2022.

== Band members ==
Current

- Hunter Kennedy
- Pierre Greeff
- Fred den Hartog
- Sheldon Yoko

Past

- Darren Rix
- Leon Pienaar
- Johnny de Ridder
- Phillip Erasmus – drums

== Discography ==
Studio albums

- Die Heuwels Fantasties (2009)
- Wilder as die Wildtuin (2011)
- Alles Wat Mal Is (2012)
- Ja. Nee. Lekker (2014)
- Okay! (2017)
- 2021 (2020)
- HERVERBEEL (2020)
- Volume II (2022)

EPs

- Pille vir Kersfees (2008)
- Wens Jy Was Hier (2013)
- Volume (2021)
- C'est la vie (2022)
