= Stellenberg High School =

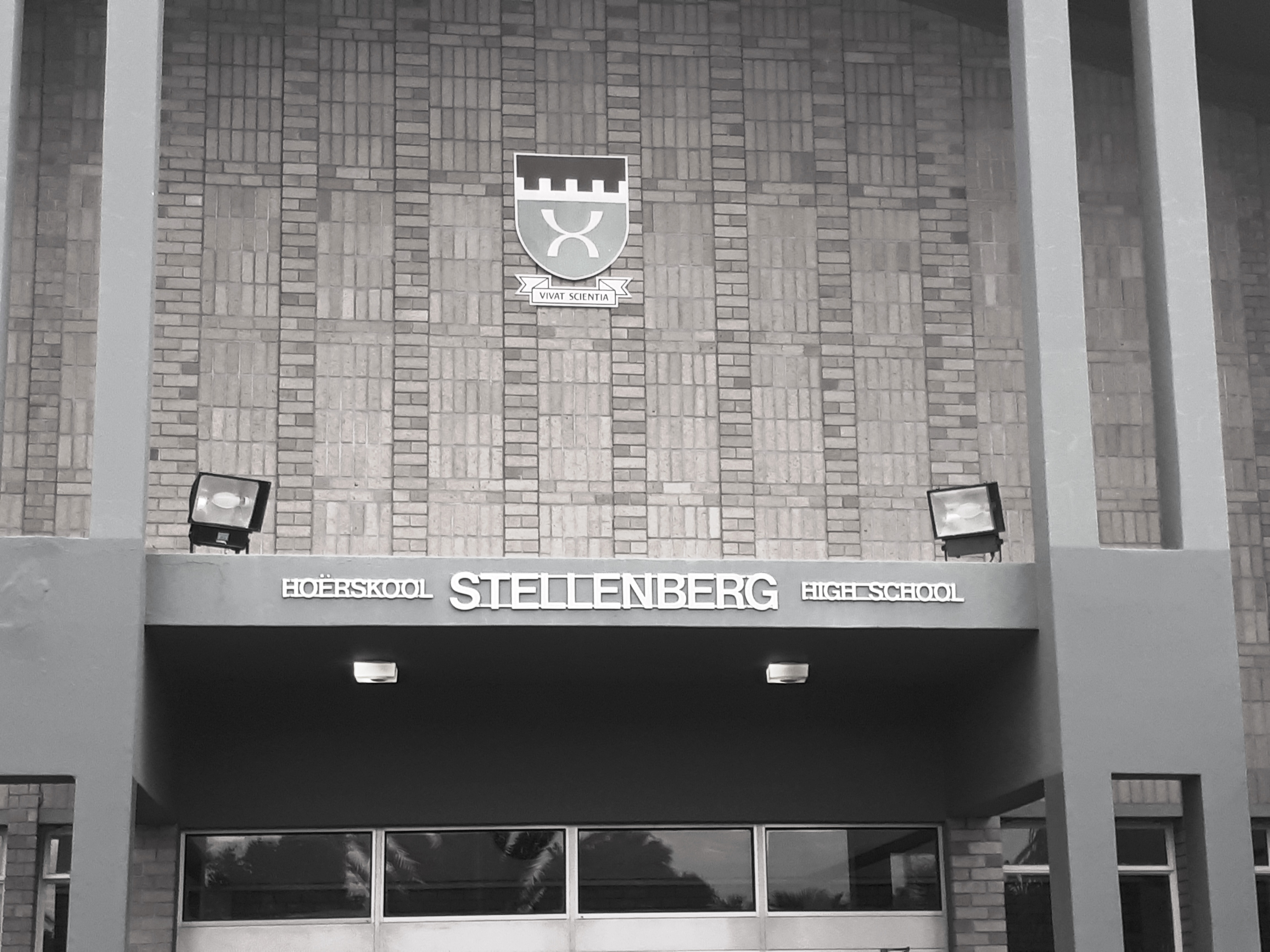
- Hoërskool Stellenberg 2018

Location
- Mountain View Road, Bellville; Cape Town, Western Cape; South Africa
- Coordinates: 33.8637°S 18.6620°E

Information
- School type: Public
- Motto: Vivat Scientia (Let Knowledge Live)
- Religious affiliation: Christianity
- Established: 1986; 40 years ago
- School district: District 4
- Principal: Yolandé Havinga
- Staff: 100 full-time
- Grades: 8–12
- Gender: Coeducational
- Age: 13 to 18
- Average class size: 30
- Classes offered: Afrikaans, English, German, isiXhosa, Physics, Life Science, Design, Art, Consumer Studies, Business Studies, Life Orientation, Accounting, Geography, History
- Campus: Urban
- Campus type: Suburban
- Colours: Navy; Jade; Maroon
- Mascot: Hestelian
- Nickname: Stellies
- Rivals: Hoërskool Bellville; Hoërskool Durbanville; DF Akademie; Hoërskool Tygerberg
- Accreditation: Western Cape Education Department
- Newspaper: Res Novae
- School fees: R41,500 (tuition)
- Feeder schools: Laerskool Durbanville; Laerskool Eversdal; Laerskool Kenridge; Laerskool Gene Louw
- Website: www.stellenberg.org.za

Stellenberg High School is a public, dual-medium (Afrikaans and English), co-educational high school located in Stellenberg, Bellville in the Western Cape province of South Africa. The high school was established in 1986.

== History ==
In 1986, Stellenryk High School opened its doors to 316 students and 16 faculty members. Several letters were received from parents, requesting that the school's name be changed to either Stellenberg High School or Eversdal High School. The first school day started with an assembly in the Stellenberg Dutch Reformed Church, as the school building was only partially completed at the time. Weekly assemblies later took place in a quad, until the building was completed.

The first principal, Siebert Neethling, served from 1986 until 1996.

On 23 November 1987, Stellenberg High School was officially opened by State President P.W. Botha.

The school song was written by a number of faculty members, including Johan Pretorius, who died in 2021, and was sung for the first time during an assembly on 5 November 1989. The school's motto, Vivat Scientia, freely translated, means "Let knowledge live".

The school badge depicts two motifs in silver against a background of jade and maroon. The primary motif is a curule seat, symbolizing the acquisition and transference of knowledge. The second motif, of a battlement, can be historically related to the origin of the farm, Stellenburg, as it was registered in 1705. This farm is the suburb Stellenberg today.

Principal Theo Boonzaaier was appointed in 1996 and retired in 2020. The current principal is Yolandé Havinga.

== Student body ==
The student body is represented by democratically elected student leaders, and is known as the Student Representative Council (SRC). It consists of 40 members elected from grades 9 to 12.

The Representative Council of Learners (RCL) consists of twelve members - three from each grade - and forms part of the SRC. Four head-leaders - a chairperson and three deputies - lead the student council.

== Facilities ==
Sport facilities include a South African Hockey Association-approved sand-based artificial turf, a mini hockey field, three South African Rugby Union-approved fields (grass), four netball courts, four tennis courts, a multifunctional indoor activity centre, a gymnasium and a resistance-training gym.

The school has a cafeteria and a function room with views of the sports fields and distant mountains.

STEM facilities include science labs, technology and design studios, and remedial mathematics education.

The school hosted one of the rugby games of the under-18 rugby international games, which was contested between South Africa, England, Wales and France in 2018.

== DTBS ==
Stellenberg High School participates in the annual DTBS athletics competition, along with three other schools from the Bellville area: DF Akademie, Tygerberg, Bellville and Stellenberg. DTBS is especially well known for the performance of these schools on the pavilion, where they support their athletes with LCD-like flashes and singing compilations, for which a trophy is also awarded.

Stellenberg has thus far been the most successful school in acquiring the singing trophy, winning it 11 times in the past 21 years that the cup has been awarded. The school's biggest achievement was made from 2009 until 2014, when the school won the singing trophy for six consecutive years, making it the first school to achieve this streak.

In athletics, Stellenberg has been the second most successful, achieving first place for the past six consecutive years.

== Alumni ==
Notable alumni of Stellenberg High School:

- Angelo Davids, South African Springbok sevens rugby player; matriculated in 2017
- Kayla de Waal, Olympian and FIH Hockey World Cup player
- Roxy Louw, surfer, international model, and actress
- Janko Swanepoel, Bulls rugby union player
- Tiaan Swanepoel, Lions rugby union player
- Minki van der Westhuizen, South African model and television presenter
