= Die Heuwels Fantasties (album) =

Studio album by Die Heuwels Fantasties
- Released: 3 April 2009
- Length: 43:29
- Label: Supra Familias

Die Heuwels Fantasties chronology
Die Heuwels Fantasties (2009)	Wilder as die Wildtuin (2011)

Die Heuwels Fantasties is the first album from South African electronic rock group Die Heuwels Fantasties. It was released in 2009 by Supra Familias in South Africa.

== Track listing ==
No.	Title	Length
1.	"Vinger Alleen (feat. Adriaan Brand)"	3:36
2.	"Oorlewing 101 (feat. Arno Krüger)"	3:26
3.	"Leja (feat. Arno Krüger)"	4:36
4.	"Nare Kaskenades (feat. Arno Krüger)"	4:11
5.	"Noorderlig (feat. Jack Parow)"	3:42
6.	"Die Vraagstuk (feat. Jack Parow)"	3:49
7.	"Hyg Duiwel (feat. Laudo Liebenberg)"	4:03
8.	"Klein Tambotieboom (feat. Francois Van Coke)"	3:36
9.	"Sonrotse (feat. Francois Van Coke)"	5:30
10.	"Pille Vir Kersfees (feat. Frieda Van Der Heever)"	3:36
11.	"Pêrels & Lewensredders (feat. Frieda Van Der Heever)"	3:24
12.	"Doodgewone Aand (feat. Thieve)"	4:41
13.	"Ek Dink Aan Jou (As Dit Reen) (feat. Thieve)"	3:31
14.	"Way To Go (feat. Thieve)"	3:52
15.	"Our Heritage (2010 Remix feat. Soweto Gospel Choir, JR, HHP & Jack Parow)"	3:19
16.	"Pile Vir Kersfees (acoustic live)"	3:45
Total length:		43:29
