= Carlü Sadie =

South African rugby union player

- Full name: Carlü Johann Sadie
- Born: 7 May 1997 (age 29) Bellville, South Africa
- Height: 1.82 m (5 ft 11 1/2 in)
- Weight: 136 kg (300 lb; 21 st 6 lb)
- School: Hoërskool Bellville

Rugby union career
- Position: Prop
- Current team: Bordeaux Bègles
Youth career
- 2014–2018: Western Province
Senior career
Years	Team	Apps	(Points)
2018	Stormers	9	(0)
2018–2019	Western Province	7	(0)
2019–2022	Lions	46	(10)
2019	→Stade Français Paris	6	(0)
2020–2022	Golden Lions	12	(5)
2022–2023	Sharks	23	(0)
2023	Sharks	4	(0)
2023–	Bordeaux Bègles	63	(10)
- Correct as of 27 May 2025
International career
Years	Team	Apps	(Points)
2016–2017	South Africa U20	10	(5)
2026–	South Africa	1	(0)
- Correct as of 20 October 2026

Carlü Johann Sadie (born 7 May 1997) is a South African rugby union player for Bordeaux Bègles in the Top 14. His regular position is prop.
