= Dawie de Villiers =

South African rugby union footballer (1940–2022)

- Born: Dawid Jacobus de Villiers; 10 July 1940 Burgersdorp, Cape Province, South Africa
- Died: 23 April 2022 (aged 81) Stellenbosch, Western Cape, South Africa
- Height: 1.71 m (5 ft 7 in)
- Weight: 73 kg (161 lb)
- School: Hoërskool Bellville, Bellville, Western Cape
- University: Stellenbosch University

Rugby union career
Provincial / State sides
Years	Team	Apps	(Points)
1961–1966	Western Province		
1967–1970	Boland		
1970	Transvaal		
International career
Years	Team	Apps	(Points)
1962–1970	South Africa	25	(9)

Member of Parliament
- In office 1972–1977
- Constituency: Johannesburg West

South African Ambassador to the United Kingdom
- In office 1979–1980

Minister of Trade, Industry and Tourism
- In office 1980–1986
- Preceded by: Andries Treurnicht
- Succeeded by: Kent Durr
- Constituency: Piketberg

Minister of Mineral and Energy Affairs
- In office 1989–1991
- Preceded by: Daniel Steyn
- Succeeded by: George Bartlett
- Constituency: Piketberg

Minister of Environmental Affairs and Tourism
- In office 1992–1996
- Succeeded by: Pallo Jordan

Dawid Jacobus de Villiers (10 July 1940 – 23 April 2022) was an ordained minister in the Dutch Reformed Church; a South African Government minister and a Springbok rugby captain.

== Biography ==
His father Coenie was a railway clerk and organizer of the National Party and Member of Parliament for the Vasco constituency from 1953 to 1961. The family moved to Caledon where he began his schooling. However, they moved again a year later to Bellville, where he matriculated in 1959 at the Hoërskool Bellville.

In 1960 he studied at the University of Stellenbosch where he obtained a degree in Theology and gained honours in Philosophy. During 1962 to 1963, he was President of the Student Council.

In 1963–1964, he was a part-time lecturer in philosophy at the University of the Western Cape and was awarded the Abe Bailey and Markotter scholarships. He was the Pastor of the Wellington congregation of the Dutch Reformed Church from 1967 to 1969. After that, he became a lecturer at the Rand Afrikaans University (RAU). In 1972 he completed his MA in philosophy and received a scholarship to study abroad.

He was married to Suzaan Mangold. They had three daughters and a son.

== Springbok rugby ==
De Villiers also excelled in rugby (scrumhalf position) and became involved in all levels of the sport, including representing South Africa in 25 test matches, His first international test match was in 1962 against the British Lions, aged 22. In 1970 he captained the Springboks against New Zealand.

=== Test history ===
No.	Opponents	Results (SA 1st)	Position	Tries	Dates	Venue
1.	British Lions	3–0	Scrumhalf		21 July 1962	Kings Park, Durban
2.	British Lions	8–3	Scrumhalf		4 Aug 1962	Newlands, Cape Town
3.	Ireland	6–9	Scrumhalf		10 April 1965	Lansdowne Road, Dublin
4.	New Zealand	3–6	Scrumhalf (c)		31 July 1965	Athletic Park, Wellington
5.	New Zealand	19–16	Scrumhalf (c)		4 September 1965	Lancaster Park, Christchurch
6.	New Zealand	3–20	Scrumhalf (c)		18 September 1965	Eden Park, Auckland
7.	France	26–3	Scrumhalf (c)		15 July 1967	Kings Park, Durban
8.	France	16–3	Scrumhalf (c)		22 July 1967	Free State Stadium, Bloemfontein
9.	France	14–19	Scrumhalf (c)		29 July 1967	Ellis Park, Johannesburg
10.	France	6–6	Scrumhalf (c)		12 August 1967	Newlands, Cape Town
11.	British Lions	25–20	Scrumhalf (c)	1	8 June 1968	Loftus Versfeld, Pretoria
12.	British Lions	6–6	Scrumhalf (c)		22 June 1968	Boet Erasmus, Port Elizabeth
13.	British Lions	11–6	Scrumhalf (c)		13 July 1968	Newlands, Cape Town
14.	British Lions	19–6	Scrumhalf (c)		27 July 1968	Ellis Park, Johannesburg
15.	France	12–9	Scrumhalf (c)		9 November 1968	Stade Chaban-Delmas, Bordeaux
16.	France	16–11	Scrumhalf (c)	1	16 November 1968	Stade Olympique, Colombes
17.	Australia	30–11	Scrumhalf (c)		2 August 1969	Ellis Park, Johannesburg
18.	Australia	19–8	Scrumhalf (c)		20 September 1969	Free State Stadium, Bloemfontein
19.	England	8–11	Scrumhalf (c)		20 December 1969	Twickenham, London
20.	Ireland	8–8	Scrumhalf (c)		10 January 1970	Lansdowne Road, Dublin
21.	Wales	6–6	Scrumhalf (c)		24 January 1970	National Stadium, Cardiff
22.	New Zealand	17–6	Scrumhalf (c)	1	25 July 1970	Loftus Versfeld, Pretoria
23.	New Zealand	8–9	Scrumhalf (c)		8 August 1970	Newlands, Cape Town
24.	New Zealand	14–3	Scrumhalf (c)		29 August 1970	Boet Erasmus Stadium, Port Elizabeth
25.	New Zealand	20–17	Scrumhalf (c)		12 September 1970	Ellis Park, Johannesburg

== Politics ==
While he was lecturing at RAU, the then rector, Gerrit Viljoen, persuaded him at this time to become active in politics. Against his father's wishes, De Villiers entered politics and stood for election. He was elected to the House of Assembly as MP for Johannesburg West and was re-elected in the elections of 1974 and 1977.

In April 1979, De Villiers was appointed South African Ambassador in London. On his return in October 1980 he became Minister of Trade and Industry. The following year he contested the Cape Town Gardens constituency, but lost to Ken Andrew of the Progressive Federal Party. He was subsequently elected MP for Piketberg, Cape Province.

While he was the Minister of Trade and Industry, the Liquor Act was passed which desegregated South African bars at the owners’ discretion and the South African Tourist Board was established. In 1983, he called a commission to investigate monopolies, and he stimulated small business in rural and ‘homeland’ areas. In 1989 he became Minister of Mineral and Energy Affairs, and of Public Enterprises as well as Cape NP leader.

== Death ==
He died from cancer in Stellenbosch, Western Cape on 23 April 2022.

== See also ==
- List of South Africa national rugby union players – Springbok no. 382

Sporting positions
Preceded by Nelie Smith	Springbok Captain; 1965-1970	Succeeded by Tommy Bedford
Diplomatic posts
Preceded by	South African Ambassador to the United Kingdom; 1979-1980	Succeeded by
Political offices
Preceded by Andries Treurnicht as Minister of Tourism	Minister of Trade, Industry and Tourism; 1980-1986	Succeeded by Kent Durr as Minister of Tourism
Preceded by Daniel Steyn	Minister of Mineral and Energy Affairs; 1989-1991	Succeeded by George Bartlett
Preceded by	Minister of Environmental Affairs and Tourism; 1992-1996	Succeeded by Pallo Jordan
