= Minki van der Westhuizen =

South African model and television presenter (born 1984)

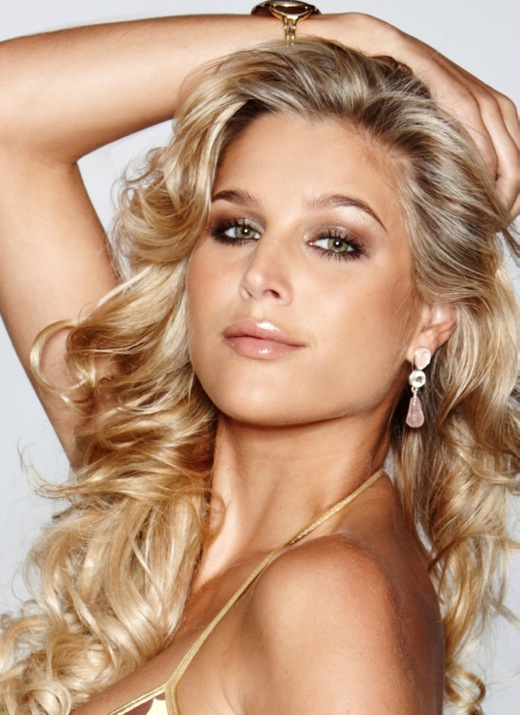
- Born: Willemien van der Westhuizen; 26 February 1984 (age 42); Durbanville, Western Cape, South Africa
- Other name: Minki van der Westhuizen
- Spouses: Constant Visser (m. 2007; div. 2009) Ernst Joubert (m. 2012)
- Modeling information
- Height: 1.74 m (5 ft 8 1/2 in)
- Hair color: Blonde
- Eye color: Green
- Agency: Max Models
- Website: www.minkivanderwesthuizen.com

Willemien "Minki" van der Westhuizen (born 26 February 1984) is a South African model and television presenter.

== Early life ==
Van der Westhuizen was born in Durbanville near Cape Town to an Afrikaans family and attended Stellenberg High School in nearby Bellville.

== Career ==
=== Modelling ===
Van der Westhuizen started modelling at the age of 16. In her final year of high school in 2002, she was selected for an international campaign by the fashion label Guess. She is represented by Max Models in Cape Town.

She was featured in the 2002, 2003, 2006 and 2007 Swimwear editions of the South African Sports Illustrated magazine and on the cover of GQ.

She was ranked #24 on Maxim's Hot 100 list for 2003 and voted the winner of the FHM 100 Sexiest Women in the World poll by South African FHM readers in 2004.

In 2003, she was voted the most popular pin-up girl by US troops serving in the Iraq War.

=== Television ===
Van der Westhuizen appeared in the M-Net televised special of the 2006 South African Sports Illustrated Swimwear edition shoot.

In 2007, she was a featured personality on the e.tv documentary series Behind the Name.

She became a presenter on the SABC 2 Afrikaans magazine programme Pasella in May 2007.

=== Film ===
Van der Westhuizen played the role of Mimi in the 2007 South African comedy film Big Fellas.

== Personal life ==
Van der Westhuizen dated Graeme Smith, the captain of the South Africa national cricket team, from 2004 to 2006.

She married Stellenbosch businessman Constant Visser in September 2007. In November 2009, her publicist confirmed the couple had decided to divorce.

She began dating Saracens rugby player Ernst Joubert in August 2010, they married in June 2012. The couple have three daughters.
