= Skop, Skiet en Donner =

Studio album by Van Coke Kartel
- Released: March 2010
- Length: 46:43
- Label: Rhythm Records

Wie's Bang is Van Coke Kartel's third studio album. It was released in March 2010.

== Track listing ==
No.	Title	Writer(s)	Length
1.	"Voor Ons Stof Word"		3:59
2.	"Ondier Kom!"		4:55
3.	"Huissiek Gebede"		3:45
4.	"Maniac"	Dennis Matkosky, Michael Sembello	4:25
5.	"Man Sonder Missie"		3:45
6.	"Spookstad"		3:18
7.	"Cocaine"	J. J. Cale	2:41
8.	"Skadu's Teen Die Muur"		2:55
9.	"Bitterpil"		3:35
10.	"Die Laste Sondag"		3:34
11.	"Raad Vanuit Twee Oorde"		2:46
Total length:			46:43
