= Swanesang =

Studio album by Fokofpolisiekar
- Released: 2006
- Genre: Alternative rock
- Length: 45:33
- Label: Rhythm Records

Fokofpolisiekar chronology
Brand Suid-Afrika (2006)	Swanesang (2006)	Antibiotika (2008)

Swanesang (Afrikaans: [ˈsvɑːnəsaŋ], lit. 'Swan song') is the second studio album by South African punk rock band Fokofpolisiekar. It was released in 2006 by Rhythm Records and includes the song "Brand Suid-Afrika", which was previously released on their Brand Suid-Afrika EP.

== Track listing ==
No.	Title	Length
1.	"Morning Star, Durbanville"	3:56
2.	"Heiden Heiland" ("Heathen Saviour"; in Afrikaans, Heiland refers to Christ))	4:16
3.	"Swanesang" (Swan Song)	3:28
4.	"Bel Vir Middelvinger" (Phone Middlefinger)	4:00
5.	"Vasbeslote Korporasie (Deel 1)" ("Determined Corporation (Part 1)"; a close corporation is known as a "beslote korporasie" in Afrikaans)	4:07
6.	"Prioritiseer" (Prioritise)	3:39
7.	"Vir Altyd 07 November" (Forever 07 November)	3:09
8.	"Ek Skyn (Heilig)" ("I Shine (Holy)"; in Afrikaans, "skynheilig" means hypocritical or sanctimonious)	3:48
9.	"Brand Suid-Afrika" ("South Africa Burns", from their Brand Suid-Afrika EP)	3:20
10.	"Backstage (As Daar Een Is)" (Backstage (If There Is One))	3:43
11.	"Déjà Vu"	3:50
12.	"Vasbeslote Korporasie (Deel 2)" (Determined Corporation (Part 2))	3:47
Total length:		42:03
