= Stellenberg, Bellville =

Stellenberg
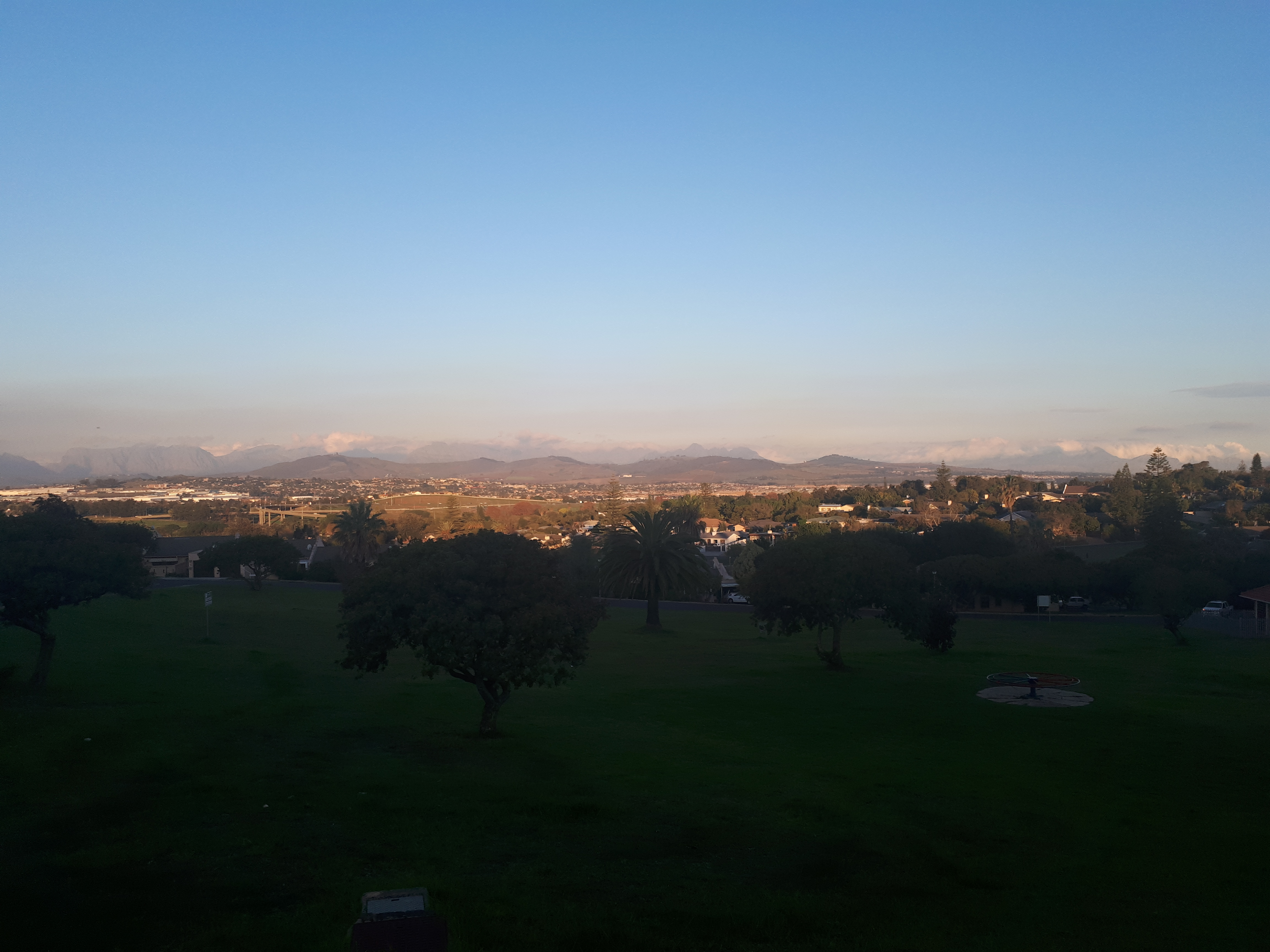
- Interactive map of Stellenberg
- Coordinates: 33°52′12″S 18°39′32.4″E
- Country: South Africa
- Province: Western Cape
- City: Bellville
- Founded: Land awarded 1705, residential development 1969

Government
  - Body: City of Cape Town
- Time zone: UTC+02:00 (SAST)
- Postcode: 7550, 7530
- Area code: 021

Stellenberg is a suburb in Bellville, Western Cape South Africa.

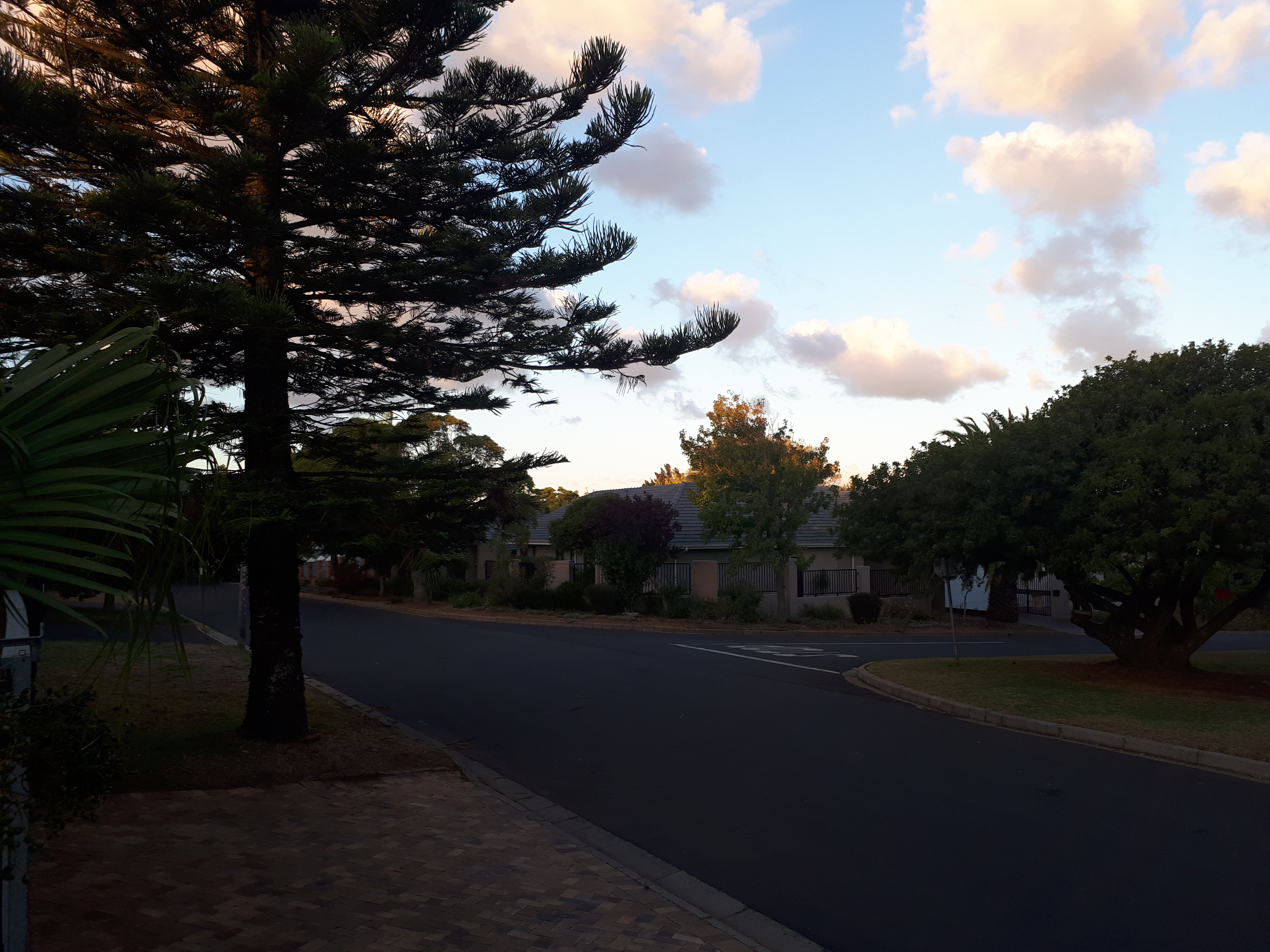
Trees in Stellenberg Bellville

== Name and history ==
The suburb originates its name from the original farm on which it was developed. The farm was called Stellenburgh (later changed to Stellenburg), and was originally owned by Johannes (Joan) Blesius in 1705. Blesius named it after the Stellenbosch Mountain which one could see from the farm. Stellenbosch is named after the Governor of the Cape Colony, Simon van der Stel. Blesius was awarded the farm by Willem Adriaan van der Stel. This van der Stel was the son of Governor Simon van der Stel. Blesius (b.1656, d.1711) came from Breukelen, the Netherlands. The land felt under the jurisdiction of de Kuijlen. In 1707 Jacobus van der Heijden became owner of the land. The land stayed in the van der Heijde family until JF de Kock bought it. JF de Kock owned it up to 1736, when it was rewarded to Hilletjie Olivier. She died in 1765. On 3 January 1882 it was transferred to John Starke and then to Jacob Jacobus Hamman. In 1883 Charl Marais owned the land. He sold it to Maria Elizabeth Green (b 6 July 1856). In 1898 Hermanus Lambertus Bosman de Waal (b. 21 September 1863) bought it and he sold it to Francois Stephanus de Villiers in 1899. In the 20th century it was sold to Old Mutual and in 1969 residential development started. Stellenburg then became Stellenberg.

== Area ==
In July 1969 this land became available for residential development. It was necessary to develop the area, as the adjacent area in Bellville Eversdal grew and it was the natural extension of that area.

== Modern Stellenberg ==
Today it is situated next to the N1, shopping centres and schools.

Stellenberg High School is situated in the area, and in the adjoining part of Bellville Eversdal there is Eversdal Primary School. One of the Montessori school called Beehive is in the suburb.

== More development ==
More suburbs were founded around Stellenberg namely:

Stellenrigde, Stellenryk, Ridgeworth

== Street naming ==
- Old Mutual street is named after the last owners of the land Old Mutual. The street that divides Eversdal and Stellenberg is named Mountain View as it has a view towards Table Mountain.
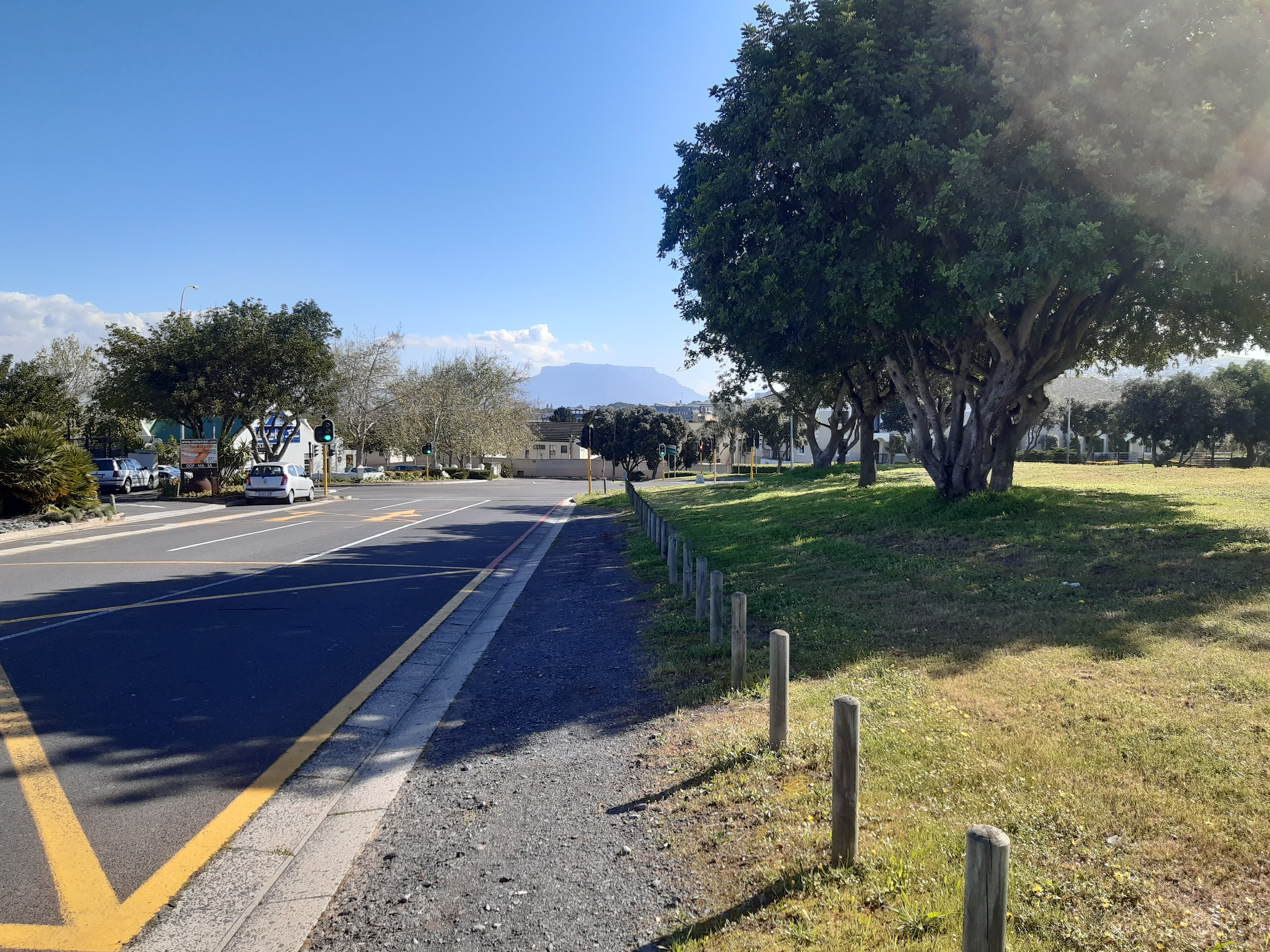
  View from Mountain View Street over Table Mountain
- The 1969 Tulbagh earthquake centred on Tulbagh in September 1969, at the time of the development of Stellenberg. As remembrance to this event a street was named Tulbagh. This street, together with Vredekloof Street in Vredekloof, Brackenfell, is known for the bird Cape robin-chat commonly known as Jan Frederik.
- The bastions of the Castle of Good Hope were remembered in street names, namely Leerdam, Buren, Katzenellenbogen and Nassau.
- The shipwrecking of the Nieuwe Haarlem, a Dutch ship in 1647 was remembered in the street Haarlem. The Nieuwe Haarlem was the frontrunner for Jan van Riebeeck’s trip to establish South Africa.
- Culemborg, the Dutch city from which Jan van Riebeeck originated, is reflected in a street with the same name.(33°52′10″S 18°39′18″E)

== Notable residents ==
- Rassie Erasmus rugby coach of the South Africa national rugby union team
- Braam Hanekom, the moderator of the Dutch Reformed Church

== Notable events ==
The Kyknet produced television drama series named “Sara se geheim (Sara’s secret)” was partly filmed in the suburb. They made use of a local fishery in the area to do the film shoot.

== Dutch Reformed Church ==
The Stellenberg Dutch Reformed Church (NG Kerk Stellenberg) was founded on 2 August 1971. The church seceded from Durbanville congregation as Durbanville became too big. It moved to the existing premises in Stellenberg on 3 May 1975. The cornerstone was revealed by Reverend JJC Visser. The church was one of the first (in 1995) in South Africa to have an annual Fest Market (Stellenberg Feesmark). It is held annually between end of October to middle November.

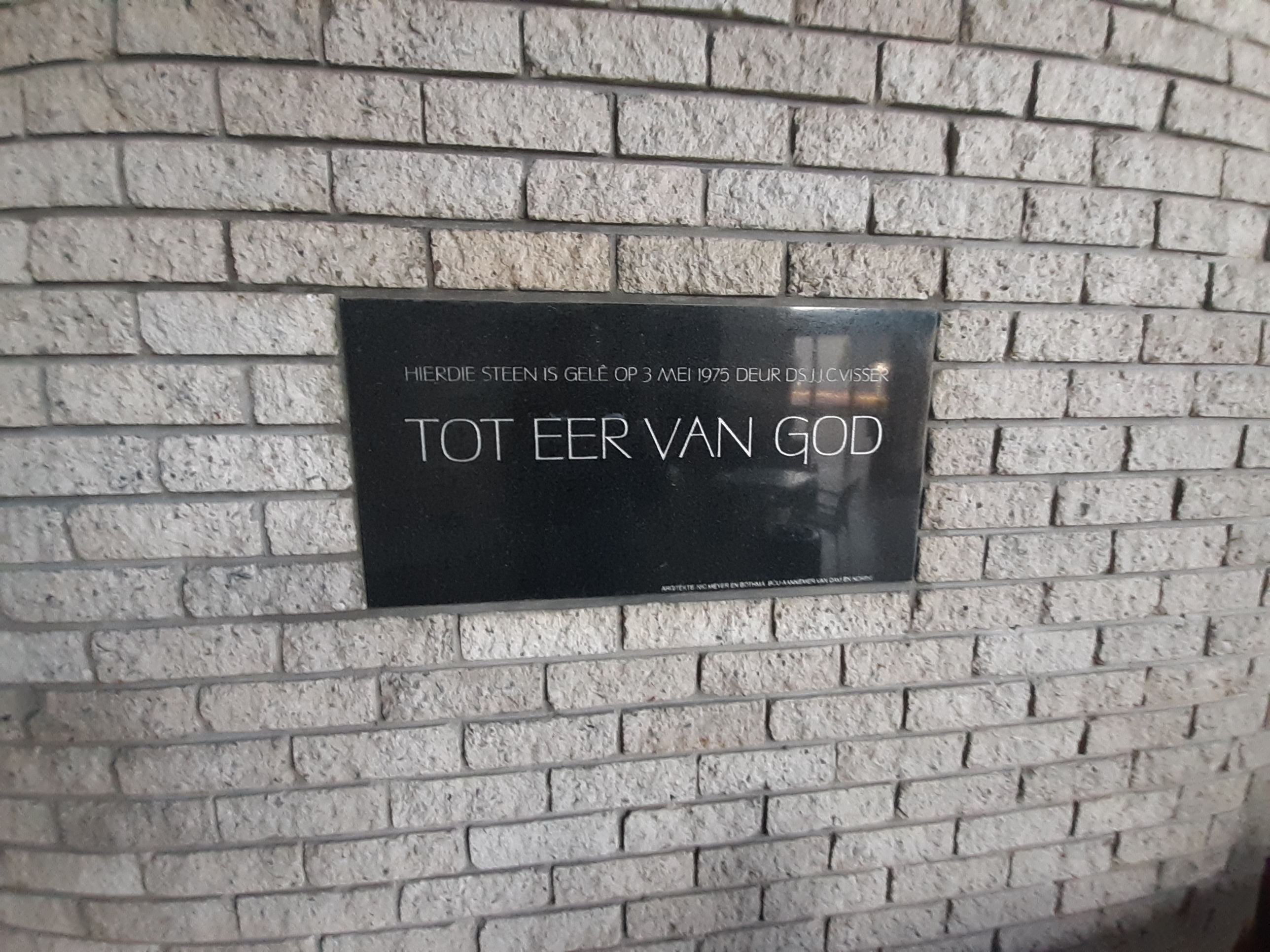
Corner Stone revealed when church was opened
