= Alles Wat Mal Is =

Studio album by Die Heuwels Fantasties
- Released: December 2012
- Label: Supra Familias

Die Heuwels Fantasties chronology
Wilder as die Wildtuin (2011)	Alles Wat Mal Is (2012)	Wens Jy Was Hier (2013)

Alles Wat Mal Is is the third studio album from South African electronic rock group Die Heuwels Fantasties, released in 2012 by Supra Familias in South Africa.

== Track listing ==
No.	Title	English translation	Length
1.	"Beloofde Land"	Promised Land	4:06
2.	"Deesdae"	These Days	3:35
3.	"Rofstoeigreep"	Rough Wrestling Grip	4:11
4.	"Ek Sou Wou"	I Would Have Wanted	3:34
5.	"Jonk Tot Môre"	Young Until Tomorrow	4:10
6.	"Koolstof Drome (feat. The Gugulethu Tenors)"	Carbon Dreams	3:48
7.	"Die Volkslied"	The People's Song	3:47
8.	"See Alleen"	Lonely Sea	2:55
9.	"Drome en Ligte"	Dreams and Lights	4:04
10.	"Onder Beheer"	Under Control	4:15
11.	"Warrelwind Saadjie"	Whirlwind Seed/Little Seed in a Whirlwind	3:43
12.	"Kristalliseer"	Crystallise	3:51
Total length:			45:59
