= Ja. Nee. Lekker =

Studio album by Die Heuwels Fantasties
- Released: 1 December 2014
- Length: 39:22
- Label: Supra Familias

Die Heuwels Fantasties chronology
Wens Jy Was Hier (2013)	Ja. Nee. Lekker (2014)	Okay! (2017)

Ja. Nee. Lekker is the fourth studio album from South African electronic rock group Die Heuwels Fantasties, released in 2014 by Supra Familias in South Africa.

== Track listing ==
No.	Title	Writer(s)	Length
1.	"Die Skemer Skema"	Die Heuwels Fantasties	3:43
2.	"Maanlig In Video"	Die Heuwels Fantasties	4:56
3.	"Sy"	Die Heuwels Fantasties	3:38
4.	"Voëlvry"	Die Heuwels Fantasties	3:12
5.	"Kom Haal My"	Die Heuwels Fantasties	3:27
6.	"Kan Nie (Jou Hart Vind Nie)"	Die Heuwels Fantasties	4:01
7.	"Doen Net Wat Jy Wil"	Die Heuwels Fantasties	4:04
8.	"Shangri-La"	Die Heuwels Fantasties	3:46
9.	"Nodig (feat. Frieda Van Den Heever)"	Die Heuwels Fantasties	4:45
10.	"Laat Hy Val Waar Hy Wil (feat. Laudo Liebenberg)"	Die Heuwels Fantasties	3:50
11.	"Ballade Vir 'N Enkeling"	Die Heuwels Fantasties	3:02
12.	"Doen Net Wat Ons Wil"	Die Heuwels Fantasties	3:44
13.	"Stilte"	Die Heuwels Fantasties	3:52
Total length:			39:22
