= Bloed, Sweet & Trane =

Studio album by Van Coke Kartel
- Released: October 2013
- Length: 43:33
- Producer: Theo Crous

Van Coke Kartel chronology
Wie's Bang (2011)	Bloed, Sweet & Trane (2013)

Professional ratings
Review scores
Source	Rating
Music Review	90%
Rolling Stone	4/5 stars

Bloed, Sweet & Trane is Van Coke Kartel's fifth studio album. It was released in October 2013, and produced by Springbok Nude Girls' guitarist Theo Crous.

== Track listing ==
No.	Title	Translation	Length
1.	"Die Dag"	The Day	3:02
2.	"Môregloed"	Morning Glow	3:41
3.	"In die Agtergrond"	In the Background	3:08
4.	"Klein Wêreld"	Small World	2:54
5.	"Niemand is Meer Heilig Nie"	Nobody is holy anymore	5:04
6.	"Sweef"	Soar	3:35
7.	"Here Man"		4:09
8.	"Moeg vir Myself"	Tired of Myself	3:17
9.	"Teenaanval"	Counter-attack	3:12
10.	"Eendag Op 'n Slag"	One day at a time	3:22
11.	"Lewendig Eindig"	Lively Ending	3:20
12.	"Volgens Getuies"	According to Witnesses	2:38
13.	"I Want Brandy"		2:11
Total length:			43:33
