= Hennie Bosman =

South African actor

Hennie (Henry) Bosman
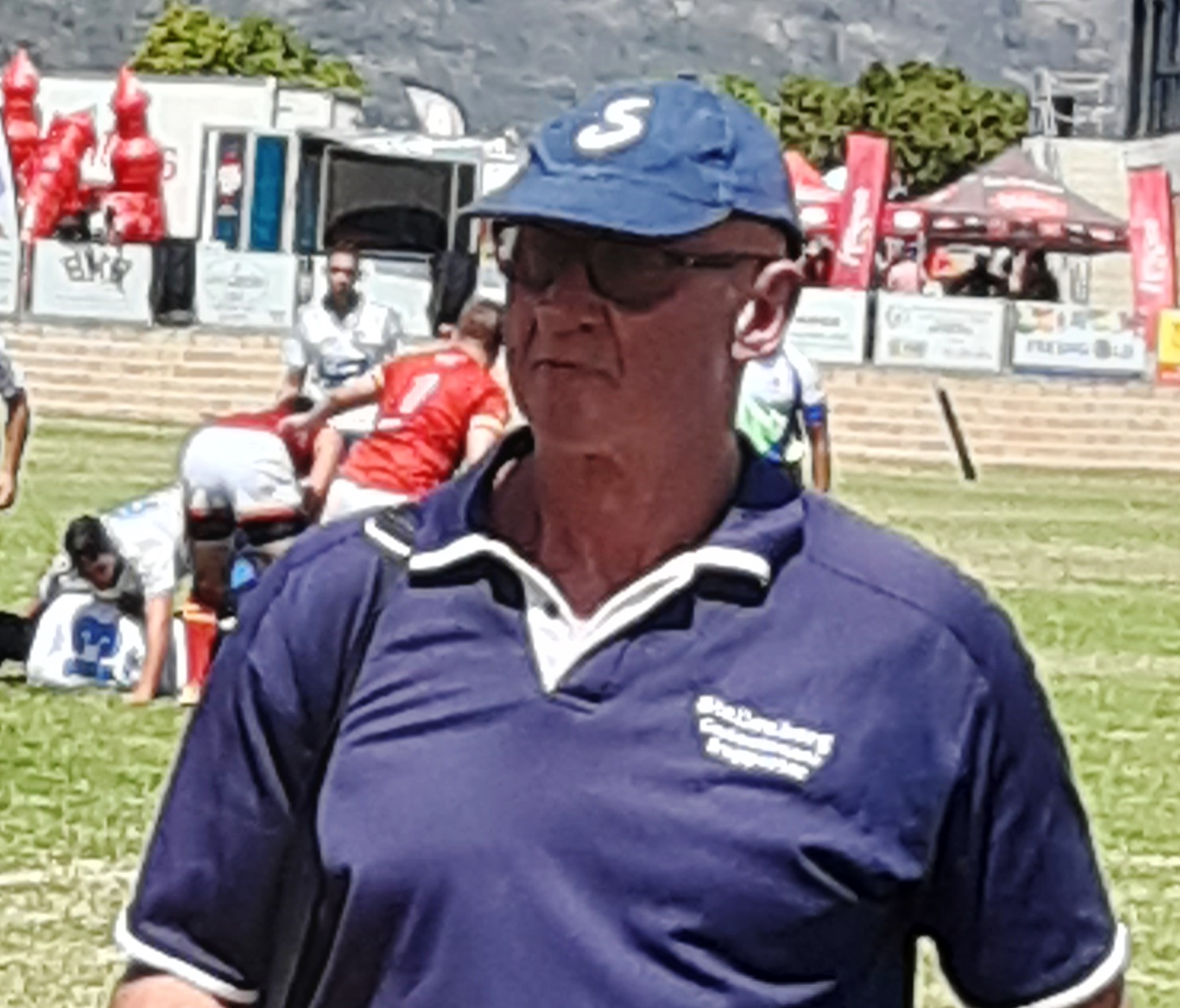
- Bosman at a rugby game

Personal details
- Born: Henry Bosman; 24 May 1956 (age 70) Bellville, Western Cape, South Africa
- Spouse: Hayley Ruth Williams
- Education: Bellville High
- Known for: Karate champion, Karate instructor, Stunt man and actor
- Awards: World senior men karate champion 2001

Henry (Hennie) Bosman is a South African karate instructor, ex–world karate champion, stunt man and actor. He is sometimes known as Henie Bosman. He owns a karate school in Bellville, Western Cape.

== Roots ==
Bosman was born on 24 May 1956 in Bellville, Western Cape, South Africa. He graduated from Bellville High School.

== Karate career ==
He started training karate in 1965 at the age of 9. He was the national champion in Kata and Kumite. He was the world senior Karate champion in 2001. That was held in Osaka, Japan. For a long period he was a 7th Dan; called Shihan (七段). He now holds the rank of 8th Dan; called Hachidan (八段 ). He is the chairman of Kyokushin Africa.

== Personal life ==
Bosman’s father was a cyclist and his mother a discus field athlete. Before making karate and the instruction thereof a career he was a detective sergeant in the South African Police Force. He is married to Hayley Ruth Williams and has two children. He was involved in scheduling a diplomatic parliamentarian meeting between Russia and Japan. He is also a motorracing driver.

== Filmography ==
=== Stuntman appearances ===
Stuntman appearances
Year	Title	Credit
2004	Wake of Death	Henry Bosman
2005	The Marksman	Henie Bosman
2006	Avenger	Henie Bosman
2008	The Legend of Drona	Henie Bosman
2012	Gallowwalkers	Stunt double

=== Actor appearances ===
Acting appearances
Year	Title	Role	Notes
1987	Survivor	Regulator	
2008	Doomsday	Telamon (The Gladiator)	
2009	Invictus	High School Coach	
2010	Lost Boys: The Thirst	Kirk O’Dale (vampire)	
2010	Death Race 2	Xander Grady	
2012	Agent Vinot	Businessman	
2013	Zulu	Shaved head	
2015	Shark Killer	Clambone	
2015	Momentum	Huge Man	
2016	Grimsby	Joris Henchman	
2018	Samson	Goliath	
