= Selfmedikasie =

Studio album by Fokofpolisiekar
- Released: 2017-10-03
- Genre: Alternative rock, power pop
- Length: 42:09

Fokofpolisiekar chronology
Antibiotika (2008)	Selfmedikasie (2017)

Selfmedikasie is the third studio album by South African punk rock band Fokofpolisiekar. It was released in 2017 after a crowdfunding campaign on Thundafund.

== Track listing ==
No.	Title	Length
1.	"Dis in my bloed, baby" (Its in my blood, baby)	2:32
2.	"Parkiebank, herfs 2017" (Park bench, autumn 2017)	3:35
3.	"Afgesonder" (Isolated)	3:08
4.	"Ek glo in die son" (I believe in the sun)	3:42
5.	"Selfoontoring van Babel" (Cellphone tower of Babel)	3:09
6.	"Ek is cool (ons is fuct-up)" (I'm cool (we are fucked up))	3:27
7.	"Wat is hierdie liedjie se naam?" (What is this song's name?)	2:10
8.	"Belowe jou, belowe my" (Promise you, promise me)	3:12
9.	"Selfmedikasie" (Self-medication)	3:20
10.	"B2CY" ("CY" is Bellville's registration number prefix)	3:32
11.	"Komma" (Comma)	3:30
12.	"FLVJ" (FLVJ stands for "Fokken lief vir jou", which translates to "Fucking love you")	3:37
13.	"Lied van die slang" (Song of the snake)	3:17
Total length:		42:09
