= As Jy Met Vuur Speel Sal Jy Brand =

- Original 2003 album cover

EP by Fokofpolisiekar
- Released: December 2003
- Recorded: 21–26 September 2003
- Studio: B-Sharp Studios
- Genre: Alternative rock Punk rock
- Length: 22:14; 24:54 (reissue)
- Label: Rhythm Records
- Producer: Jean-Paul de Stefani

Fokofpolisiekar chronology
As Jy Met Vuur Speel Sal Jy Brand (2003)	Lugsteuring (2004)

"As Jy Met Vuur Speel Sal Jy Brand" (pronounced [ˈas jəi mɛt ˈfyːr ˈspiəl ˌsal jəi ˈbrant]; If you play with fire, you will get burned) is the debut CD of the South African punk rock band Fokofpolisiekar. It is a seven track EP released in 2003 by Rhythm Records in South Africa.

In 2004, it was reissued with a bonus track, "Fokofpolisiekar", and the music video for "Hemel op die platteland". The original version of the EP was released with a white cover, while the reissue had a black one.

In 2013, it was reissued on 10" vinyl for the band's tenth anniversary, with new cover art. This edition was reissued in 2018. Both versions included the hidden material from the CD releases.

In 2023, the album was reissued on vinyl, with the original white variant of the CD cover art and a new song, "Blades", which was originally written during the writing sessions for the band's debut full-length album Lugsteuring. This edition, however, omits the hidden tracks from the CD and 2013 vinyl releases.

== Track listing ==
No.	Title	Length
1.	"As Jy Met Vuur Speel Sal Jy Brand" (If You Play With Fire You Will Burn)	2:24
2.	"Maak of Braak" ("Make or Vomit", a wordplay on "make or break")	2:24
3.	"Verklaar" (Declare)	2:46
4.	"Hemel op die Platteland" (Heaven in the Countryside)	2:39
5.	"Vernietig Jouself" (Destroy Yourself)	1:58
6.	"Tygerberg Vliegtuig" (Tygerberg Aeroplane (With hidden track at 5:51 on the original version))	10:03 (2003); 2:51 (2004)
7.	"Fokofpolisiekar" (Fuck off police car (With hidden track at 5:37) (not on original release))	9:51
Total length:		24:53
