= Monoloog in Stereo =

EP by Fokofpolisiekar
- Released: 2005
- Genre: Alternative rock
- Length: 23:18
- Label: Rhythm Records

Fokofpolisiekar chronology
Lugsteuring (2004)	Monoloog in Stereo (2005)	Brand Suid-Afrika (2006)

Monoloog in Stereo (Monologue in Stereo) is a 6-track EP by South African punk rock band Fokofpolisiekar, released in 2005. The album has a playtime of 23:18.

Unlike the band's previous releases, Monoloog in Stereo doesn't contain any obscenities in the lyrics. The anger, which was readily available in previous albums, was also toned down and replaced by sung, not screamed, lyrics which reflect the sadness of the South African youth who live with no future and a detestable past.

== Track listing ==
No.	Title	Length
1.	"Oop Vir Misinterpretasie" (Open to Misinterpretation)	3:43
2.	"Ek Dink Aan Jou (As Dit Reën)" (I Think of You (When It Rains))	3:39
3.	"Die Illusie Van Veiligheid" (The Illusion of Safety)	4:15
4.	"Wintersdag By Die Seer" ("Winter's Day at the Sore"; with wordplay on "Shore")	4:03
5.	"Monoloog in Stereo" (Monologue in Stereo)	4:02
6.	"Die Seksuele Revolusie" (The Sexual Revolution)	3:23
Total length:		23:05
