= Fokofpolisiekar =

South African rock band

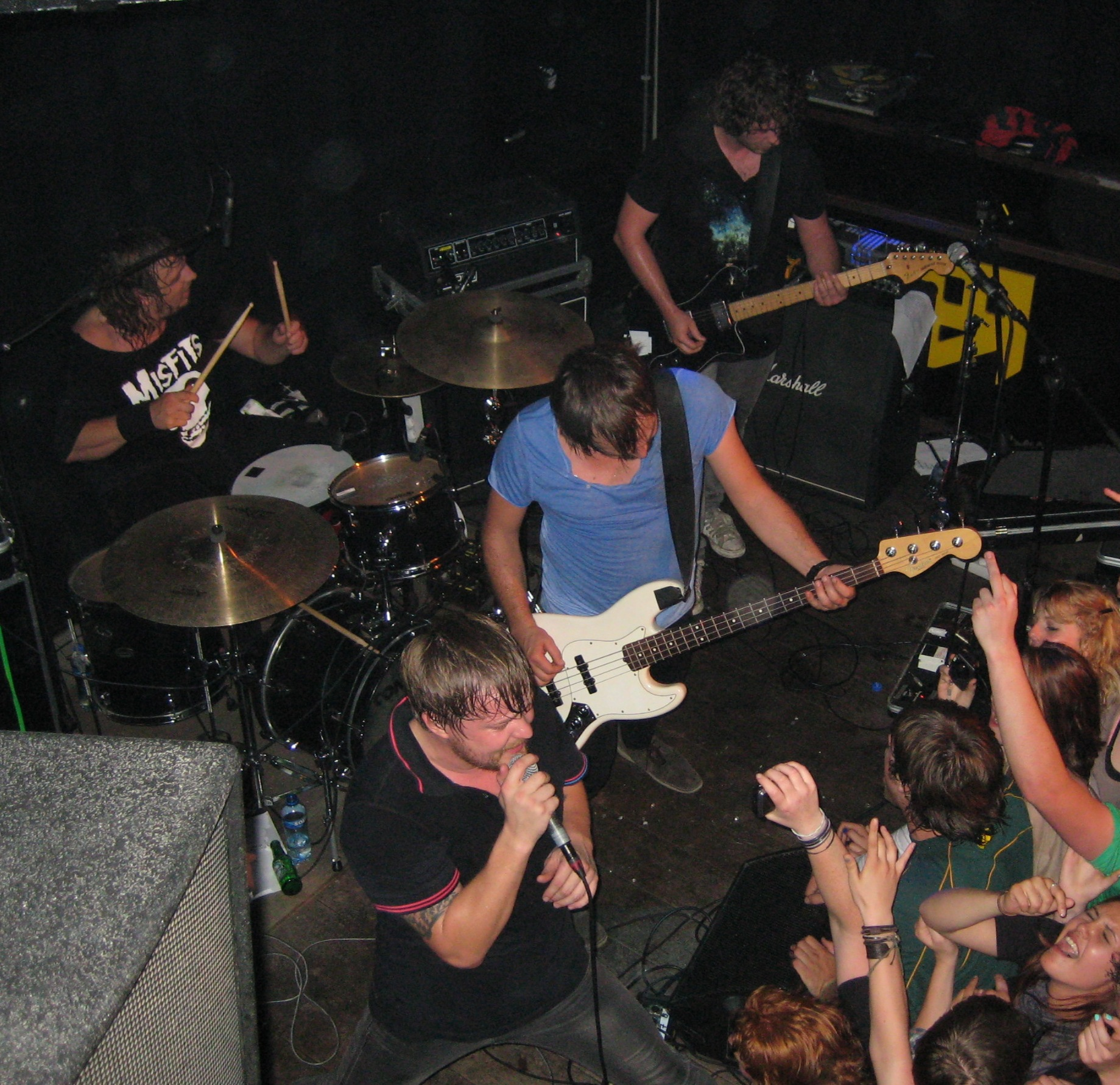
- Fokofpolisiekar in Amsterdam, Netherlands, May 2011.

Background information
- Also known as: Polisiekar; Die Bende; Fokof
- Origin: Bellville, South Africa
- Genres: Punk rock; pop-punk
- Years active: 2003–present
- Label: Rhythm
- Members: Francois Badenhorst; Hunter Kennedy; Johnny de Ridder; Wynand Myburgh; Jaco Venter
- Past members: Justin Kruger
- Website: Official website

Fokofpolisiekar (Afrikaans: [ˈfɔkɔf puˈlisiˌkɑːr], Fuckoffpolicecar) is an Afrikaans alternative rock band from Bellville, near Cape Town, South Africa. Due to the obscenity in the name, they are also commonly known simply as Polisiekar or FPK.

== Band history ==
The band was formed in April 2003, initially as a joke to shock the mostly conservative Afrikaner community with its name and also the notion of an Afrikaans alternative band. All the members were well known in local underground music circles from their work in the bands New World Inside, 7th Breed, and 22 Stars.

In late 2003, they released their first EP, As Jy Met Vuur Speel Sal Jy Brand (If You Play With Fire You Will Burn), soon after forming. One of the tracks from the EP, Hemel op die Platteland (Heaven in the Countryside), made history when it became the first Afrikaans song to be officially playlisted on national radio station 5FM.

Their first complete album, Lugsteuring, released in 2004, was produced by John Paul De Stefani and Reinhard Behr. This was followed in 2005 with another EP, Monoloog In Stereo (Monologue in Stereo). In 2006 they released both an EP, Brand Suid-Afrika (Burn South Africa); and a new album, Swanesang (Swan Song), that included the hit single "Brand Suid-Afrika".

In February 2006, drummer Jaco Venter jumped out the band's tour van while on tour in Witbank, shattering his elbow and breaking his hip. Justin Kruger, who was previously the drummer for Christian band, Neshamah, filled in for Venter while he was recovering. Kruger ended up playing drums on the Brand Suid-Afrika EP a week after joining the group. Some songs from this studio session also later appeared on 2006's Swanesang album – the remaining songs were played by Venter later that year after his recovery and subsequent reunion with Fokofpolisiekar.

After their first EP As Jy Met Vuur Speel Sal Jy Brand, and an even more popular full-length album, Lugsteuring, the following album Monoloog In Stereo went in a more acoustic rock direction, contrasting the alternative rock feel of their first album. Brand Suid-Afrika had the band return to their roots. Swanesang, their second full-length album, featured more acoustic elements and (arguably) less controversial lyrics than their previous albums. They have also recorded a cover version of Depeche Mode's "Shake the Disease" for the South African Depeche Mode tribute album Mode of Obscurity. In September 2008, the band released an EP/DVD entitled Antibiotika, which was recorded at Belville Studios in Cape Town. The EP features 4 new tracks, as well as a DVD featuring all of the band's music videos and a behind-the-scenes look at an upcoming documentary based on the band.

In 2009, a documentary about the band was released. "Fokofpolisiekar: Forgive Them for They Know Not What They Do" premiered at the 2009 Encounters International Documentary Film Festival in July, where it won the "Audience Award". It was released nationwide in theatres across South Africa on 23 October 2009.

In March 2011, Protea Boekhuis published an authorised biography of the band entitled "Biografie Van 'n Bende" (Biography of a gang). Written by author Annie Klopper, it explores the history of the band, their lifestyle, and their attack on the mainstream Afrikaans music scene of the day.

Fokofpolisiekar have performed at various venues throughout South Africa, and in October 2005 the band toured the United Kingdom. They also toured Netherlands, Belgium, and the United Kingdom during November 2006.

On 23 March 2017, the band announced that they would be recording their next studio album, using Thundafund to fund the recording. The resulting album, Selfmedikasie, was released on 3 October.

In 2018, they released an EP, Droom Hoog.

To celebrate the band's 16th birthday, they had a 2-hour show with a career-spanning setlist on 23 July 2019, at Loftus D Field, in Pretoria. They recorded the show and released it as a live album in 2020. For their 17th birthday they did another 2-hour show, with the exception of it being online (due to the COVID-19 Pandemic). They released an EP, Kajuitkoors, in 2020.

In 2023, they went into the studio to record a new full-length album, Dans deur die donker, that would be funded by their second crowdfunder. A 20th anniversary 10" vinyl version of their debut EP As jy met vuur speel sal jy brand was released, containing a bonus track recorded during the new album sessions which was written in 2004, and a nine-cassette boxset of their entire recorded output was also due for release later in the year. Dans deur die donker was released on 7 December.

2025 saw the band announce their first Australian shows in Brisbane and Perth for March 2026.

In May 2026, Hunter Kennedy said the band were recording a new album under the working title Post-Afrikaner.

== Band members ==
- Francois "Van Coke" Badenhorst – vocals
- Johnny de Ridder – lead guitar
- Hunter Kennedy – back-up vocals and rhythm guitar
- Wynand Myburgh – bass
- Jaco "Snakehead" Venter – drums
- Justin Kruger – Touring drummer

== Music style ==
The band has a unique sound compared to other Afrikaans bands. Their material can be compared to bands such as Alkaline Trio. At the Stellenbosch launch of the "Monoloog in Stereo" EP, Francois Van Coke referenced a Queens of the Stone Age DVD they watched earlier that day.

The band mostly performs music that can be classified as alternative rock, varying somewhat between albums and songs. Their music provides commentary on all aspects of South African life, and in particular the socio-political milieu of Afrikaans-speaking South Africans. They also provide a wide range of commentaries on religion in South Africa, ranging from blasphemous references to subjective experiences of disbelief.

The band changed musically with every album released: from raw sounding EPs to the more mature "Swanesang" with rock music influences. Tracks like "Heiden Heiland", "Prioritiseer", "Brand Suid-Afrika" and "Backstage" from Swanesang displayed a more mature style of songwriting, as well as better studio production (such as the use of a vocoder to fill out Van Coke's singing). Swanesang was recorded at B-Sharp Studios in Boksburg, South Africa; and was co-produced by band-member Johnny De Ridder. The album was released in September 2006.

The EP/DVD Antibiotika is a progression on the sounds the band explored with Swanesang and influences from the band-members' other projects such as aKing and Van Coke Kartel. The EP was recorded at Belville Studios in Cape Town, South Africa; and was again co-produced by Johnny De Ridder.

== Controversy ==
The band has been embroiled in controversy since inception over their name and personal views. Initially radio stations were hesitant to play the band's tracks because of the profanity "Fokof" ("fuck off") in the band's name. The nicknames Polisiekar ("police car"), "FPK", and "Die Bende" ("The Band / Gang") was soon adopted by mainstream media who did not want to pronounce the full name in fear of objection from the public.

In 2004 the band were involved in a bar fight when a group of men recognised them and insulted Van Coke, calling him a "moffie" (South African slang equivalent to "faggot"). Since then the band has earned a reputation for engaging in fistfights that often break out at their CD launches and gigs. Another example is the CD launch of Lugsteuring, where the band jumped off the stage to help stop a fight.

Controversy surrounding the band peaked in April 2006, when bass guitarist Myburgh wrote the words "fok god" ("fuck god") on the wallet of a friend of Afrikaans singer Bobby van Jaarsveld, who asked for an autograph. This occurred in the early hours of the morning when he was intoxicated after a show. Religious leaders from all over South-Africa used various media (including radio interviews and letters to newspapers) to express their disapproval of the band's religious sentiment. This almost resulted in the band being excluded from the Klein Karoo National Arts Festival. In the end the band was allowed to play on the condition that the words "fok god" not be sung in any of their songs. The band later asked the public to forgive them, as that would be "...what Jesus would have done".

Yet, despite the controversy surrounding their music, the band remains popular in South Africa, drawing in large crowds wherever they perform.

== Hiatus ==
On 13 March 2007, Myburgh announced the hiatus of Fokofpolisiekar in the Afrikaans newspaper Rapport, saying, "All of us want to do our own thing, such as Johnny who wants to start producing, and Francois and myself who are doing our own solo projects."

Van Coke began performing acoustic sets in Stellenbosch under his own name in the last half of 2007, alongside Laudo Liebenberg, before they both set out on their own new bands.

Wynand Myburgh and Francois van Coke began a new endeavor, Van Coke Kartel with drummer Justin Kruger. Their self-titled debut album Van Coke Kartel was released in December 2007, with the follow-up album Waaksaam & Wakker being released in September 2008.

Jaco Venter and Hunter Kennedy have formed a new band, aKING, along with Hennie van Halen and Laudo Liebenberg who performed with Van Coke on his acoustic sets. Their debut album, Dutch Courage, was released in February 2008 and has gone on to be the most successful of all the Fokofpolisiekar offshoot bands.

Hunter Kennedy, Johnny De Ridder and Pierre Greeff have formed a new group, Die Heuwels Fantasties, which has an electronic sound in the vein of The Postal Service. In December 2007 they announced plans to release their first EP through their own label, Supra Familias. Johnny De Ridder is also the producer. They released a self-titled album in March 2009 under their Supra Familias Label.

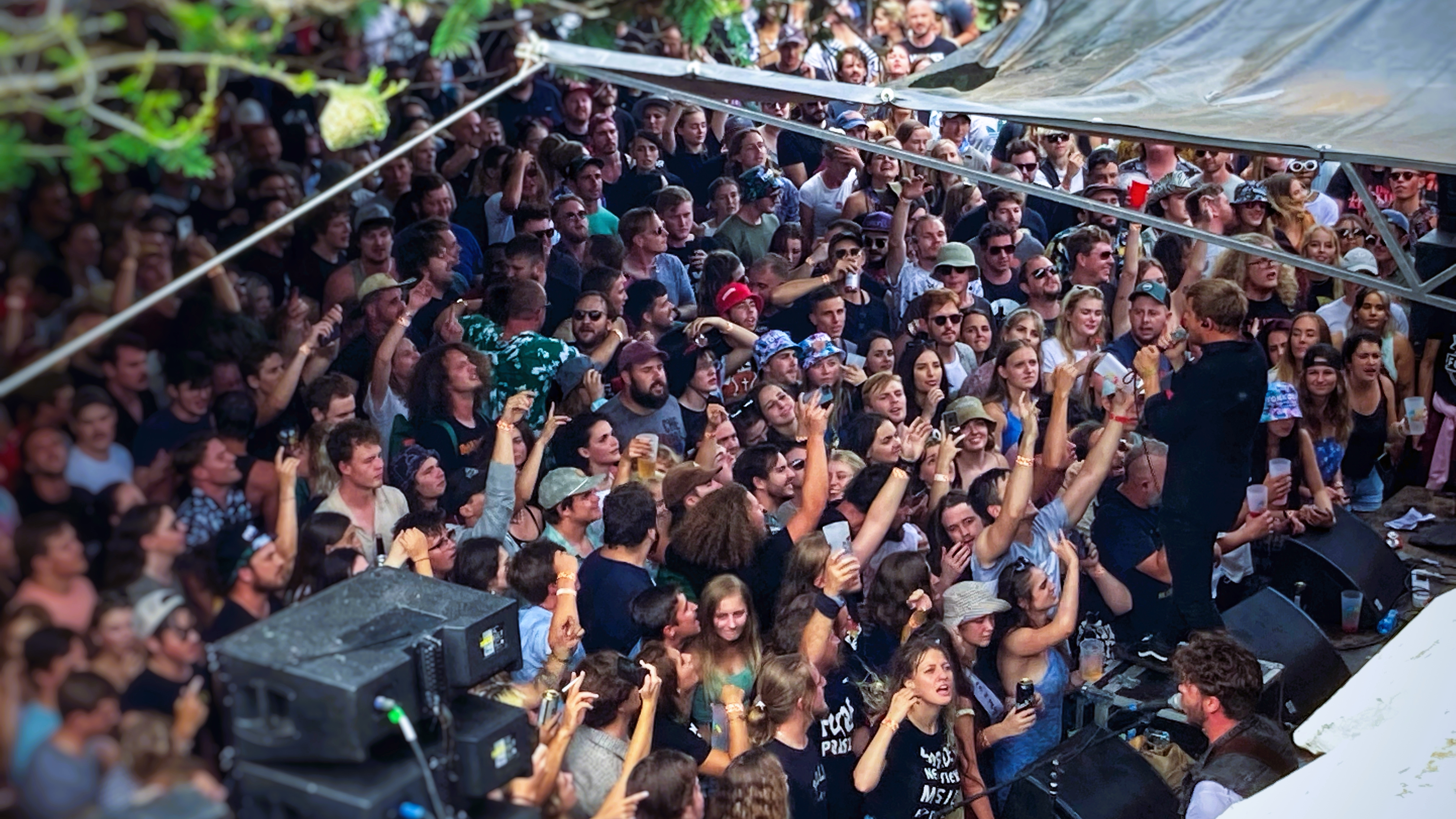
Fokofpolisiekar at Park Acoustics inside Fort Schanskop at the Voortrekker Monument in January 2022.

Francois Van Coke also published a self-titled solo album in 2015 under the Supra Familias label.

Fokofpolisiekar still regularly perform at various concerts and festivals normally on the same bill as aKING and Van Coke Kartel. In September 2008 the band released an EP of new material after originally toying with the idea of releasing a "greatest hits" compilation. A lot of fans have questioned if the band are still on a hiatus or rather just being selective over the number of shows and amount of press they do.

In September 2009, their vocalist Francois Van Coke had an interview, with HeadbangToday.com in which he said: "We're not on a break anymore. We are doing 2-5 shows a month, but more festivals and bigger shows. After the release of 'Antibiotika', we would really like to do another full-length album, probably next year."

== Newest material ==
Since the release of Swanesang, Fokofpolisiekar has released two new singles.

- Dag Dronk (2012)
- Paranoia (2014)

They also released a new album labeled Selfmedikasie in 2017. A new EP, Droom hoog, was released in November 2018.

They released a new album called Dans Deur Die Donker in 2023.

== Craft beer brand ==
In 2014 the band announced that they would be launching their own range of craft beer named after their own songs, Dag Dronk, Antibiotika, Hemel op die Platteland and Skyn Heilig.

However, in 2015 they announced that the full range will no longer be produced and that Fokof Lager will be their only craft beer. The beer is produced in Cape Town by the Devil's Peak Brewery.

== Discography ==
Studio albums

- Lugsteuring (2004)
- Swanesang (2006)
- Selfmedikasie (2017)
- Dans Deur Die Donker (2023)
- Post-Afrikaner (2027)

Extended Plays

- As Jy Met Vuur Speel Sal Jy Brand EP (2003)
- Monoloog In Stereo EP (2005)
- Brand Suid-Afrika EP (2006)
- Antibiotika EP (2008)
- Droom Hoog EP (2018)
- Kajuitkoors EP (2020)

Singles

• Dagdronk (2012)

• Paranoia (2014)

• Komma (Live at Kirstenbosch Gardens) [2018]

Compilation albums

- Forgive Them For They Know Not What They Do (2009)
- Fokofpolisiekar 10 Year Anniversary (2012)

Live albums

- Forgive Them For They Suck K*k (2013)
- Sweet 16 (2020)
- Super Sick Seventeenth (2020)
- The Sound of Fokof Unplugged (2021)
