= Brand Suid-Afrika =

EP by Fokofpolisiekar
- Released: 2006
- Recorded: 2005
- Length: 14:00
- Label: Rhythm Records

Fokofpolisiekar chronology
Monoloog In Stereo (2005)	Brand Suid-Afrika (2006)	Swanesang (2006)

"Brand Suid-Afrika", which can directly be translated to "Burn South Africa," is a 4-track EP by South African punk rock band Fokofpolisiekar. It was released by Rhythm Records in 2006 and includes a music video of a previously released single, "Hemel Op Die Platteland (Acoustic)". The CD is about 14 minutes long without the music video.

== Song interpretation ==
The song follows a young man who is troubled by memories of someone of the past, mostly someone who was politically active in the 1930s and 40s who is now an old man. This could also be in reference to many of the older generation clinging to the idea of afrikaner nationhood and Apartheid. The name Brand Suid Afrika could mean 2 things depending on the tense, burn South Africa or South Africa is burning. Together with the image created of South Africa burning in the shadows and the reference to the 'Ossewa Brandwag' blowing up the municipality, this could be read as stating that people are struggling to move on and keep dredging up the past while the present/future is not being looked at.

The song also complains about the current state of South Africa and encourages the listener to do something about the situation, rather than just complain. The music video (discussed in detail below) prominently displays a logo of South-Africa burning while the destruction of Afrikaans symbolism is shown throughout.

The symbol used on the album is in reference to the 'Ossewa Brandwag' symbol. It has the eagle but with one change, the oxwagon is replaced with the African continent and the burning of south africa. the reason for this symbolism is to explain the origin of afrikaner nationalism and culture as a whole with its roots in world war 2. it is an uncomfortable thought and one which the apartheid government tried to cover up.

There are knives waiting for you

Vir jou is daar nog messe wat wag

In the bushes outside your house at night

In die bosse buite jou huis in die nag

We will be safe

Ons sal mos veilig wees

We will be safe

Ons sal mos veilig wees

We keep our consciences clear

Ons hou ons gewetens skoon

Then we lock the door

Ons sluit toe die deur

This is in reference to south africa being a very violent country and not able to go outside at night. We lock our doors and so we absolve ourselves of shame and guilt with clear conscience that we are not responsible for any problems.

We took petrol

Ons het petrol gevat

And we burned all our bridges

En ons het al ons brûe afgebrand

Before we were on the other side

Voordat ons aan die anderkant was

this is in reference on how the apartheid government built the middle class to be whites only and afterwards the bridge to this wealth we burned, leaving the country to be poor. This is about the poverty of South Africa as a whole and how wealth is unattainable for the majority of the country. Here in the story the person starts to question the situation at night.

And I realize now

En ek besef nou

And I realize only now

En ek besef nou eers

The writer goes to sleep and start to have hallucinations of the past, the following is what he hears. Chorus

Blood and iron, blood and soil

Bloed en yster, bloed en grond

Blood and oil, blood and soil

Bloed en olie, bloed en grond

Scared and lazy and desperate

Bang en lui en desperaat

There is nothing new under the sun

Daars niks nuuts onder die son nie

And in the shadow South Africa burns

En in die skaduwee brand Suid-Afrika

the slogan is a popular slogan nationalist slogan from the 1940s. the specific slogan is said to be born from Jopie Fourie's execution. Blood and iron originates with Otto Von Bismarck while Blood and soil is a Nazi slogan to their right to the land. This is in reference to the political movements the old man was part of, and is his mindset and slogan he chants. The repetition shows how fanatical and obsessive this old man is. it draws parallel how when these evil movements grows in the shadows the country burns.

What do I know about being honest?

Wat weet ek van eerlik wees?

My conscience seeps through my waking life

My gewete syfer deur my wakker lewe

Is this old man's memory

Is hierdie ou man se geheue

And I realize now

En ek besef nou

And I realize only now

En ek besef nou eers

This directly shows the conflicting feeling this man has where the memories of this old man is seeps into his own conscience and he cannot get rid of.

chorus:

Blood and iron, blood and soil

Bloed en yster, bloed en grond

Blood and oil, blood and soil

Bloed en olie, bloed en grond

Scared and lazy and desperate

Bang en lui en desperaat

There is nothing new under the sun

Daars niks nuuts onder die son nie

And in the shadow South Africa burns

En in die skaduwee brand Suid-Afrika

And I realize now

En ek besef nou

And I realize only now

En ek besef nou eers

The ossewa brandwag

Die ossewabrandwag

went last night

Het gisteraand

The municipality

Die munisipaliteit

blown up

Opgeblaas

This is in reference how the ossewa brandwag committed acts of sabotage against the government to support the german war effort, and here the old man blew up the municipality building.

chorus

Blood and iron, blood and soil

Bloed en yster, bloed en grond

Blood and oil, blood and soil

Bloed en olie, bloed en grond

Scared and lazy and desperate

Bang en lui en desperaat

There is nothing new under the sun

Daars niks nuuts onder die son nie

And in the shadow South Africa burns

En in die skaduwee brand Suid-Afrika

And us for you

En ons vir jou

And us for you

En ons vir jou

Landmines of guilt

Landmyne van skuldgevoelens

In a one-man concentration camp

In 'n eenman-konsentrasiekamp

Ons vir jou is reference to the old nationalist slogan of ons vir jou suid afrika which was featured in multiple nazi slogans and later Die stem in the national anthem. It also shows how this person feels guilty about his ancestors actions and believes. He lives in a one-man concentration through the torment experienced from learning this story.

You complain about the state of our country

Jy kla oor die toestand van ons land

Well fuck do something about it

Wel fokken doen iets daaromtrent

Brand South Africa

Brand Suid-Afrika

this is a call to action for the youth to well burn the past and look to the future to build something for everyone and stop complaining.

== Track listing ==
No.	Title	Length
1.	"Tieneraksie Einde" (Teen-Action Ending)	3:59
2.	"Brand Suid-Afrika" (Burn South-Africa)	3:18
3.	"Klipgooi Glashuis" (Stonethrow Glasshouse)	3:22
4.	"Hemel Op Die Platteland (Acoustic)" (Heaven in The Countryside)	3:16

Extras

"Hemel Op Die Platteland (Acoustic)" music video

== Music video ==
In the music video for "Brand Suid-Afrika" we find the band playing alone in a camp terrain when suddenly a group of cars surround them, each car containing a different group of people. The groups consist of a dysfunctional family, two "boere" (farmers), a young couple, and a group of boys.

While the band plays, clips of the people are shown in which they at first appear to be normal, but the more we see of them, the more we realise that none of them are in fact as normal as they seemed at first. At first we see a bunch of "trompoppies" (South African cheerleaders) who are doing a perfect routine with flags from the ossewa brandwag and the image seems distorted, as this is the memory of the old man. We see the young couple talking in the back seat of a car, the family grouping together to take a photograph and the two "boere" sitting together on a car in front of a fire, while the one looks at the other one.

When the song starts to become heavy things get out of control at the camp site. The couple start to undress and furiously make-out, after the family photograph is taken the husband starts arguing with his wife, the teenage daughter walks off, the 13-year-old son laughs at the situation and the domestic worker for the family just looks at the camera with a concerned, almost depressed look on her face.

The young boys have become hooligans and start beating another boy while fireworks start shooting around them and the boere take each other's hands, and near the end go to kiss each other, which we do not see (because the camera moves down) but we see them grabbing each other's backsides. And when the lead "trompoppie" drops her baton stick we see the lead singer of Fokofpolisiekar, Francois van Coke, talking in a bunch of microphones, twirling his finger around in circles. The "perfect image" is broken and shown the true humanity of mistakes and imperfection. It contrasts starkly with the image of the old nationalists of the "perfect afrikaner" and that we are all human.

The video ends with the band playing and the family photo appears in front of us but then bursts into flames and the logo of the "Brand Suid-Afrika" CD-single (An eagle with its heart visible standing on a circle with a picture of Africa where missiles are being dropped on South Africa, which is on fire; a play on the emblem of the Ossewabrandwag) appears in front of us and stays there until the music-video ends.
