= Lugsteuring =

Studio album by Fokofpolisiekar
- Released: September 1, 2004
- Genre: Alternative rock
- Length: 41:18
- Label: Rhythm Records

Fokofpolisiekar chronology
| As Jy Met Vuur Speel Sal Jy Brand (2003) | Lugsteuring (2004) | Monoloog In Stereo (2005) |

Lugsteuring ([ˈlœχ.styœrəŋ], lit. 'Air Disturbance') is the debut studio album from the South African alternative rock band Fokofpolisiekar (Fuck Off Police Car). It was released in 2004 by Rhythm Records in South Africa.

== Track listing ==
| No. | Title | Length |
|---|---|---|
| 1. | "Bid Vir My" (Pray For Me) | 3:18 |
| 2. | "Sielswartgat" (Soul Black Hole) | 3:33 |
| 3. | "Sporadies Nomadies (Kom Dans)" (Sporadically Nomadic (Come Dance)) | 3:56 |
| 4. | "Lugsteuring" (Air Disturbance) | 3:52 |
| 5. | "Tonnelvisie" (Tunnel Vision) | 3:23 |
| 6. | "Ontken Altyd Alles" (Always Deny Everything) | 3:13 |
| 7. | "Die Grootste Gaping" (The Biggest Gap) | 4:13 |
| 8. | "My Lys Verskonings" (My List of Excuses) | 2:47 |
| 9. | "Leeglê Drome Droom" (Dreaming Idle Dreams) | 3:33 |
| 10. | "Tevrede?" (Satisfied?) | 4:18 |
| 11. | "Angs Aanval" (Panic Attack) | 2:58 |
| 12. | "Tiny Town" | 2:08 |
| Total length: | | 40:12 |

In order to commemorate 10 years since the release of Lugsteuring, the album has been re-released on vinyl. A limited run of 500 copies were pressed.
