= Van Coke Kartel =

South African rock band

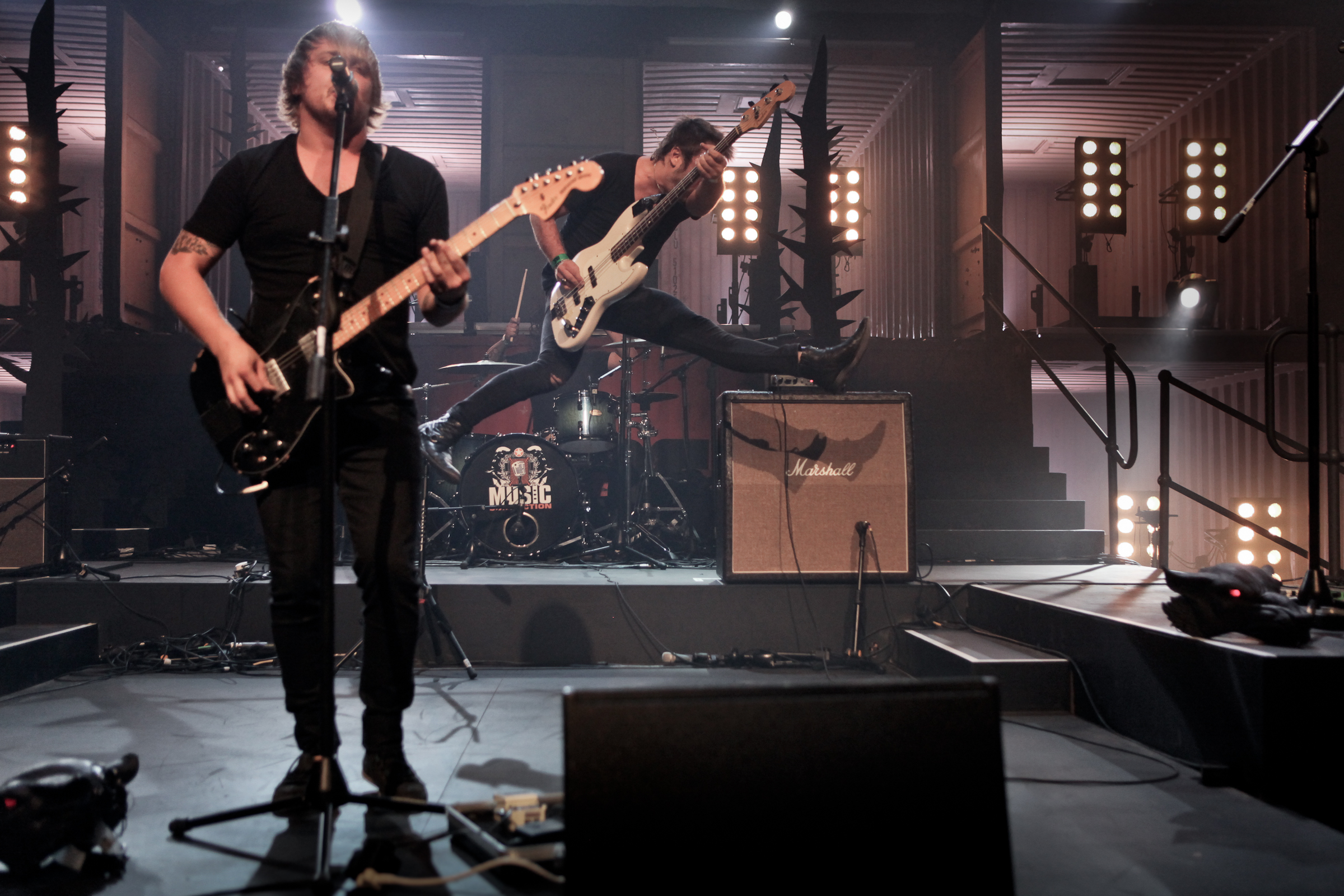
- Van Coke Kartel in MK Awards 2011.

Background information
- Also known as: VCK
- Origin: Bellville, South Africa
- Genres: Alternative rock
- Years active: 2007–2017; 2019–present
- Labels: Rhythm
- Members: Francois Badenhorst; Wynand Myburgh; Jedd Kossew; Dylan Hunt
- Past members: Justin Kruger; Jason Oosthuizen
- Website: Official website

Van Coke Kartel is an Afrikaans alternative rock band from Bellville, near Cape Town, South Africa.

== Band history ==
Francois Van Coke and Wynand Myburgh formed Van Coke Kartel with drummer Justin Kruger after Fokofpolisiekar went on hiatus in 2007. Guitarist Jedd Kossew and drummer Jason Oosthuizen joined as full members in 2010. However in 2014, Jason Oosthuizen left the band. Their new drummer Dylan Hunt started in January 2014.

== Notable achievements ==
Van Coke Kartel has been one of the most successful Afrikaans rock bands in South Africa. The second album, Waaksaam en Wakker, won the SAMA award for Best Afrikaans Rock Album, for which their self-titled debut album was nominated the year before. They have played alongside international heavyweights, such as Muse, Thirty Seconds to Mars, Korn, Chris Cornell, Good Charlotte, Billy Talent and Metallica. They have also toured internationally.

=== Awards ===
Year	Nominated work	Award	Result
2011	Band	MK Music Awards: Best Live Act	Won
2012	Ondier Kom	MK Music Awards: Best Group	Won
2012	Vir Almal	MK Music Awards: Best Rock	Won
2012	Band	MK Music Awards: Best Live Act	Won
2012	Ondier Kom	MK Music Awards: Best SFX/ Animation	Nominated
2013	Tot Die Son Uitkom	MK Music Awards: Best Video	Won
2013	Dis 'n Land	MK Music Awards: Best Group	Won
2013	Dis 'n Land	MK Music Awards: Best Rock	Won
2014	Bloed, Sweet & Trane	SAMA Awards: Best Rock Album	Won
2014	Bloed, Sweet & Trane	Ghoema Awards: Best Album	Won
2014	Band	Ghoema Awards: Best Group	Won
2014	Band	MK Music Awards:Best Afrikaans Group	Won

== Discography ==
- Van Coke Kartel (2007)
- Waaksaam en Wakker (2008)
- Skop, Skiet en Donner (2010)
- Wie's Bang (2011)
- Bloed, Sweet & Trane (2013)
- Energie EP (2015)
