= Francois Van Coke =

South African musician (born 1980)

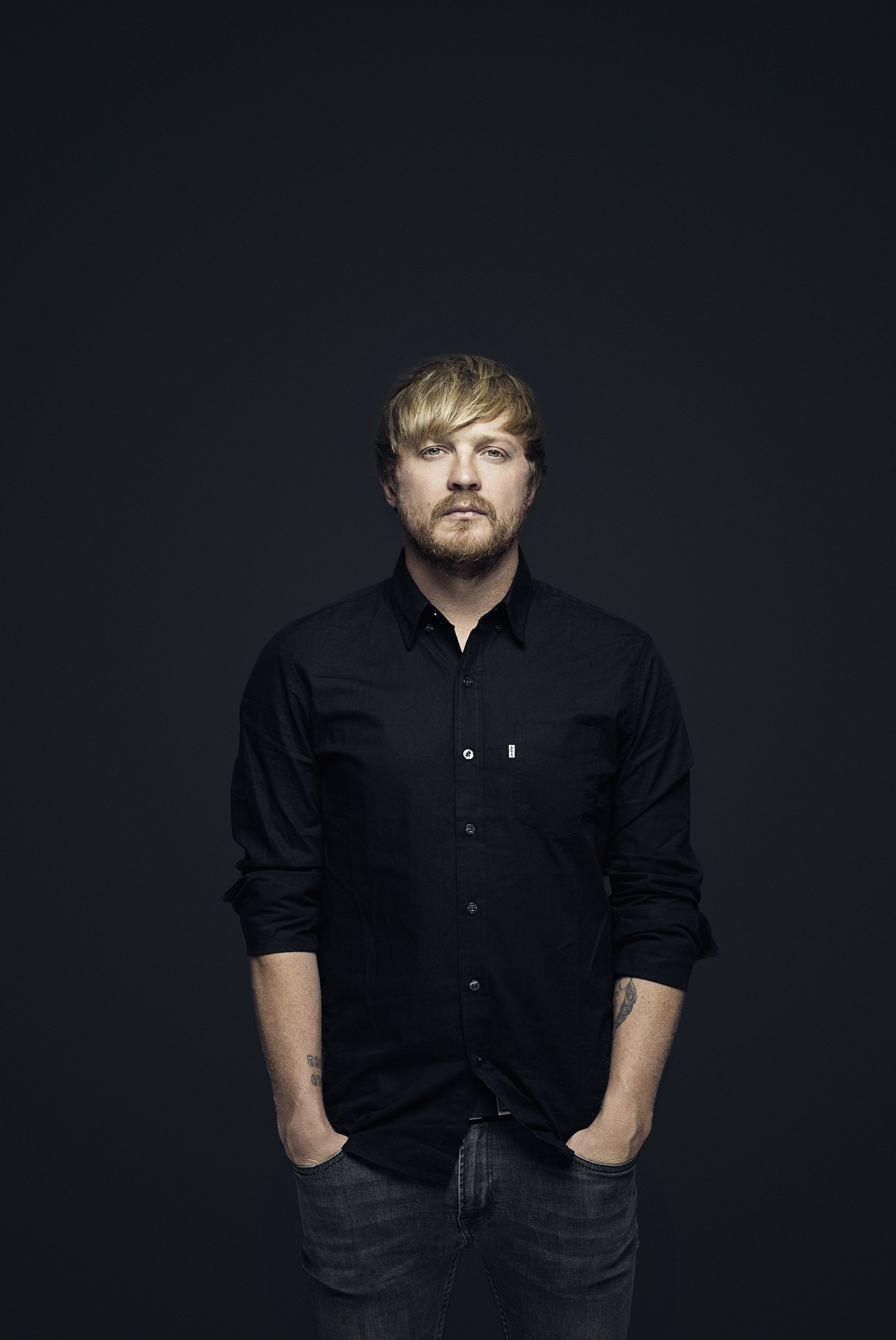
- Van Coke in 2018

Background information
- Born: Francois Badenhorst; 18 September 1980 (age 46); Brakpan, Gauteng, South Africa
- Genre: Pop rock
- Occupations: Musician; songwriter
- Instruments: Vocals; guitar
- Years active: 2003–present
- Member of: Fokofpolisiekar; Van Coke Kartel
- Website: francoisvancoke.co.za

Francois Badenhorst (Afrikaans pronunciation: [franˈsʋɑː ˈbɑːdənɦɔrst]; born 18 September 1980), better known by his stage name Francois Van Coke, is a South African singer-songwriter known both as the frontman of the rock bands Fokofpolisiekar and Van Coke Kartel and as a solo artist.

== Career ==
Francois Van Coke has been the frontman of the rock band Fokofpolisiekar since its formation in 2003, and in 2007, he founded Van Coke Kartel with two other members of Fokofpolisiekar. In 2015, he launched a solo career, releasing a self-titled album, which was led by the single "Toe Vind Ek Jou", featuring Karen Zoid. His second album, Hierdie is die Lewe, followed in 2017, and in 2018, he issued the four-track EP Francois van Coke en Vriende, which featured collaborations with Die Heuwels Fantasties, Early B, Laudo Liebenberg, and Jack Parow. His third solo album, Dagdrome in Suburbia, came out in October 2019. In 2022, he issued Kanniedood and followed it with Die Ruimte in 2025.

== Discography ==
Studio albums

- Francois Van Coke (2015)
- Hierdie is die Lewe
- Dagdrome in Suburbia (2019)
- Kanniedood (2022)
- Die Ruimte 2025

EPs

- Francois van Coke & Vriende (2018)
- Ons Is Die Vuur (2023)
- O, My Donner (2023)
- Francois van Coke & Vriende II (2023)
