= Western Cape Education Department =

South African education department

Department overview
- Formed: 1994
- Preceding agencies: Cape Province Department of Education; House of Representatives Department of Education and Culture; Department of Education and Training; House of Delegates Department of Education and Culture
- Jurisdiction: Government of the Western Cape
- Headquarters: 1 North Wharf Square, 2 Lower Loop Street, Foreshore, Cape Town 8001, South Africa; 33°55′1.223″S 18°25′28.169″E
- Employees: 40,181
- Annual budget: R11,845,691,000
- Minister responsible: Vacant, Provincial Minister of Education
- Department executive: Brent Walters, Head: Education
- Website: wcedonline.westerncape.gov.za

The Western Cape Education Department (abbreviated WCED) is the department of the Government of the Western Cape responsible for primary and secondary education within the Western Cape province of South Africa. The political leader of the department is the Provincial Minister of Education.

== History ==
During the apartheid era, education in South Africa was segregated according to race, with different government departments administering schools for the different races. What is now the Western Cape was at that time part of the Cape Province, and schools for white students were run by the Education Department of the Cape Provincial Administration. Schools for coloured students were run by the House of Representatives Education Department, while schools for black students were run by the Department of Education and Training. Some integration of these schools had occurred during the last years of apartheid, but the administrations remained divided.

On 27 April 1994, the date of the 1994 general election, the Interim Constitution of South Africa came into effect, abolishing the old provinces and establishing the nine new provinces. The new Western Cape Education Department inherited those schools of the previous departments that were located within the Western Cape.

== Structure ==
The administrative head of the department, subordinate to the Minister, is the Superintendent-General of Education (also known as the Head of Education); as of November 2009 this is Penny Vinjevold.

In the 2010/11 financial year the department had 40,181 employees and a budget of R11,845,691,000. It is responsible for all primary and secondary education in the province, including the provision of government schools, Further Education and Training colleges and Adult Basic Education, and the oversight of independent schools.

Rural education districts of the Western Cape.

Urban education districts of Cape Town.

The Western Cape is divided into eight education districts; four are "rural" districts which correspond to one or more district municipalities, while the other four are "urban" or "Metro" districts within the City of Cape Town. The districts are:

- Metro Central
- Metro East
- Metro North
- Metro South
- Cape Winelands
- Eden & Central Karoo
- Overberg
- West Coast

The districts are responsible for the management of education, with policy and planning being handled by the head office. Each district is also divided into a number of "circuits", which provide advice, support, and specialised facilities to a smaller collection of schools.

The department also supervises the six Further Education and Training colleges in the province. These are:

- College of Cape Town
- False Bay College
- Northlink College
- West Coast College
- Boland College
- South Cape College
