= Mandali =

Mandali may refer to:

- Mandali (Meher Baba), the inner circle of disciples of Meher Baba
- Mandali, a gathering of bhajan performers
- Mandali caste, a social group of Gujarat, India
- Mandali, Iraq, a town in Iraq
- Mandali, Iran, a village in Iran
- Mandhali, a village in Punjab, India

== People with the name ==
- Mandali Mendrilla (born 1976), American fashion designer
- Mandali Buddha Prasad (born 1956), Indian politician
- Mandali Venkata Krishna Rao (1926–1997), Indian politician

== See also ==
- Mandali Puja
- Mandala (disambiguation)
- Mandalay (disambiguation)
