= Mandalay (disambiguation) =

Mandalay is the second largest city in Myanmar (Burma).

Mandalay may also refer to:

== Places ==
- Mandalay, Queensland, a locality in the Whitsunday Region, Australia
- Mandalay Region, an administrative division of Myanmar
- Mandalay, Mitchells Plain, a neighborhood of Cape Town, South Africa

== Arts and entertainment ==
- Mandalay (film), a 1934 film directed by Michael Curtiz
- Mandalay (poem), an 1890 poem by Rudyard Kipling
- Mandalay: Recipes and Tales from a Burmese Kitchen, a 2019 cookbook by MiMi Aye
- Mandalay (band), a 1995–2002 British trip hop group
- "Mandalay", a song by Gerard Francis Cobb, based on Kipling's poem
- "Mandalay", a deleted song by Electric Light Orchestra from the 1983 album Secret Messages, later released on the 1990 compilation album Afterglow

== Other uses ==
- Mandalay (restaurant), a Burmese restaurant in San Francisco, California
- Mandalay (TransMilenio), a bus station in Bogotá, Colombia
- Mandalay Pictures or Mandalay Vision, an American film production company
- SV Mandalay, a Danish-built American schooner
- Mandalay spitting cobra, a snake endemic to an area of Myanmar which includes the city of Mandalay

== See also ==
- Mandalay Bay, a resort and casino on the Las Vegas Strip, United States
- Manderlay, a 2005 film
- Manderley, a fictional estate in Daphne du Maurier's novel Rebecca
- The Road to Mandalay
