= Naeem Jack =

South African sprint hurdler (born 2007)

Personal information
- Born: 31 July 2007 (age 18)

Sport
- Sport: Athletics
- Event(s): Sprint, Hurdles

Achievements and titles
- Personal best(s): 100m: 10.18 (2025); 200m: 20.13 (2025); 110m hurdles: (99.0cm) 13.02 AU20R (2026)
Medal record
Men's athletics
Representing South Africa
African U20 Championships
Gold medal – first place	2025 Abeokuta	110m hurdles
African U18 Championships
Gold medal – first place	2023 Ndola	110m hurdles

Naeem Jack (born 31 July 2007) is a South African sprint hurdler. He is the South African under-20 record holder in the 110 metres hurdles. In 2025, he was runner-up at the South African Athletics Championships over 200 metres.

== Early life ==
Formerly of Colorado Park, he later moved to Ottery, Cape Town, and stayed with his grandparents in Portland, Mitchells Plain whilst he attended Mondale High School in Cape Town.

== Career ==
In 2023, in Ndola, Zambia, Jack set a championship record of 13.31 seconds to win the 110 metres hurdles at the African U18 Championships.

Aged 16 years-old in March 2024, Jack ran 13.10 seconds for the junior 110 metres hurdles competing for Western Province Athletics in the men’s Under-18 event at the Athletics South Africa (ASA) Youth and Junior Championships in Pretoria, to set a new South African youth record. He also won the under-18 100 metres at the same championship. In the senior South African Athletics Championships, he reached the men’s 200 metres final, placing eighth in a time of 20.72 seconds.

In March 2025, at the Athletics South Africa Junior Championships in Cape Town, in his first u20 110m Hurdles race he broke the South African u20 national record in a time of 13.16 seconds. Competing at the 2025 South African Athletics Championships he won his semi-final heat in 20.45 seconds before placing second in the final behind Sinesipho Dambile, in a time of 20.13 seconds. In July 2025, he placed third over 200 metres in the men's U23 race at the 2025 Herculis, behind race winner Gout Gout and Busang Collen Kebinatshipi of Botswana, running 20.42 seconds. That month, he won the gold medal in the 110 metres hurdles at the African U20 Championships.

In September 2025, he competed in the 200 metres at the 2025 World Championships in Tokyo, Japan.

In March 2026, Jack lowered his personal best to 13.02 seconds for the 110 metres hurdles in Pretoria.
