= Therlo Moosa =

South African soccer player

Personal information
- Date of birth: 16 June 1994 (age 32)
- Place of birth: Mitchell's Plain, South Africa
- Position: Striker

Team information
- Current team: Cape Town City
- Number: 9

Senior career*
Years	Team	Apps	(Gls)
2013–2015	Mamelodi Sundowns	0	(0)
2013–2014	→ Vasco da Gama (loan)		
2015–2016	Hellenic		
2016–2017	Milano United	14	(0)
2017–2020	Magic		
2020–2022	Glendene United		
2022–2025	Cape Town Spurs	52	(14)
2025-	Cape Town City	11	(5)
- * Club domestic league appearances and goals as of 15 June 2024

Therlo Moosa (born 16 June 1994) is a South African soccer player who plays as a striker for Cape Town City in the National First Division.

He was born in Mitchell's Plain, growing up in the neighborhood Lentegeur. As a teenager, Moosa played for clubs like Oval North High School and Morgenster United as well as Western Cape in the inter-provincial tournament. Moosa then joined Mamelodi Sundowns in his late teens. He spent time on loan with Vasco da Gama, but was not given any playing time, and never played for Sundowns' first team either. In 2015 he moved on to Hellenic.

Playing for Magic in the third tier, he was an extremely prolific goalscorer in the league. In 2021–22 Moosa scored 19 goals in the Second Division for Glendene United. He was given a chance at the title contenders in the First Division, Cape Town Spurs. Moosa's 11 goals in the 2022-23 National First Division contributed to Cape Town Spurs' promotion to the highest league. Moosa finally made his first-tier debut in the 2023–24 Premiership. In October 2025, Moosa joined Cape Town City
