= Mandra (disambiguation) =

Mandra may refer to:

- Mandra, a town in West Attica, Greece
- Mandra, Larissa, a village in Larissa regional unit, Greece
- Mandra, Xanthi, a settlement in the Xanthi regional unit, Greece
- Mandra, Haskovo Province, a village in the municipality of Haskovo, Bulgaria
- Mandra (Sokolac), a village in the municipality of Sokolac, Bosnia and Herzegovina
- Mandra (novel), a Kannada-language novel by Indian writer S. L. Bhyrappa
- Mandra (short story), a short story by Anaïs Nin (in her Little Birds (short story collection))
- Mandrah, a town in Gujar Khan, Pakistan
- Mandrem, also Mandra, a town in Goa, India

== See also ==
- Mândra (disambiguation)
- Mandira (disambiguation)
- Mandar (disambiguation)
