= Tafelsig =

Tafelsig might refer to:

== Places ==
- Table View, a neighbourhood in Cape Town, South Africa.
- Tafelsig, Mitchells Plain, a neighbourhood in Cape Town, South Africa.
