= Portland, Mitchells Plain =

Suburb of Cape Town, in Western Cape, South Africa

Portland
- Location within Western Cape Location within South Africa
- Coordinates: 34.051°S 18.613°E
- Country: South Africa
- Province: Western Cape
- Municipality: City of Cape Town
- Main Place: Mitchells Plain, Cape Town

Area
  - Total: 2.41 km^{2} (0.93 sq mi)

Population (2011)
  - Total: 24,156
  - Density: 10,000/km^{2} (26,000/sq mi)

Racial makeup (2011)
  - Black African: 3.21%
  - Coloured: 93.70%
  - Indian/Asian: 1.31%
  - White: 0.21%
  - Other: 1.57%

First languages (2011)
  - Afrikaans: 30.46%
  - English: 66.83%
  - Other: 1.01%
- Time zone: UTC+2 (SAST)

Portland is a neighborhood in the Mitchells Plain urban area of the City of Cape Town in the Western Cape province of South Africa. It is just west of the Mitchells Plain Town Centre.

Educational institutions in the area include Portland High School, Mondale High School, Montagu Drive Primary School, Jamaica Way Primary School, Wespoort Primary School, Portland Primary School, and Liesbeeck Primary. False Bay College's Mitchells Plain campus in is also in this neighborhood.
