= Westridge =

Westridge may refer to:

== Geography ==
=== Canada ===
- Westridge, British Columbia, a residential neighbourhood in Burnaby, British Columbia
- Westridge (Edmonton), a residential neighbourhood in Edmonton, Alberta
- Westridge Shopping Centre

=== Pakistan ===
- Westridge, Rawalpindi, a residential area in Cantonment board, Rawalpindi

=== South Africa ===
- Westridge, Mitchells Plain, a residential neighbourhood in Cape Town, Western Cape.

=== United Kingdom ===
- Westridge, Isle of Wight, a suburb and industrial area of Ryde on the Isle of Wight.
- Aldworth neighbouring hamlet Westridge Green.

=== United States ===
- Westridge, Arizona
- Westridge, California
- Westridge Park, Arizona

== Schools ==
- Westridge Elementary School
- Westridge School (Pasadena), a girls' school
- Westridge High School in Zimbabwe

== Sport ==
- Westridge FC, a football team in Singapore
