= Mandhira Punnagai =

Manthira Punnagai (or Mandhira Punnagai; lit. 'Magical Smile' in Tamil) may refer to these in Indian entertainment:

- Manthira Punnagai (1986 film)
- Mandhira Punnagai (2010 film)
- Manthira Punnagai (TV series)

== See also ==
- Mandira (disambiguation)
