= False Bay College =

Tertiary education institution in Cape Town, South Africa

False Bay TVET College
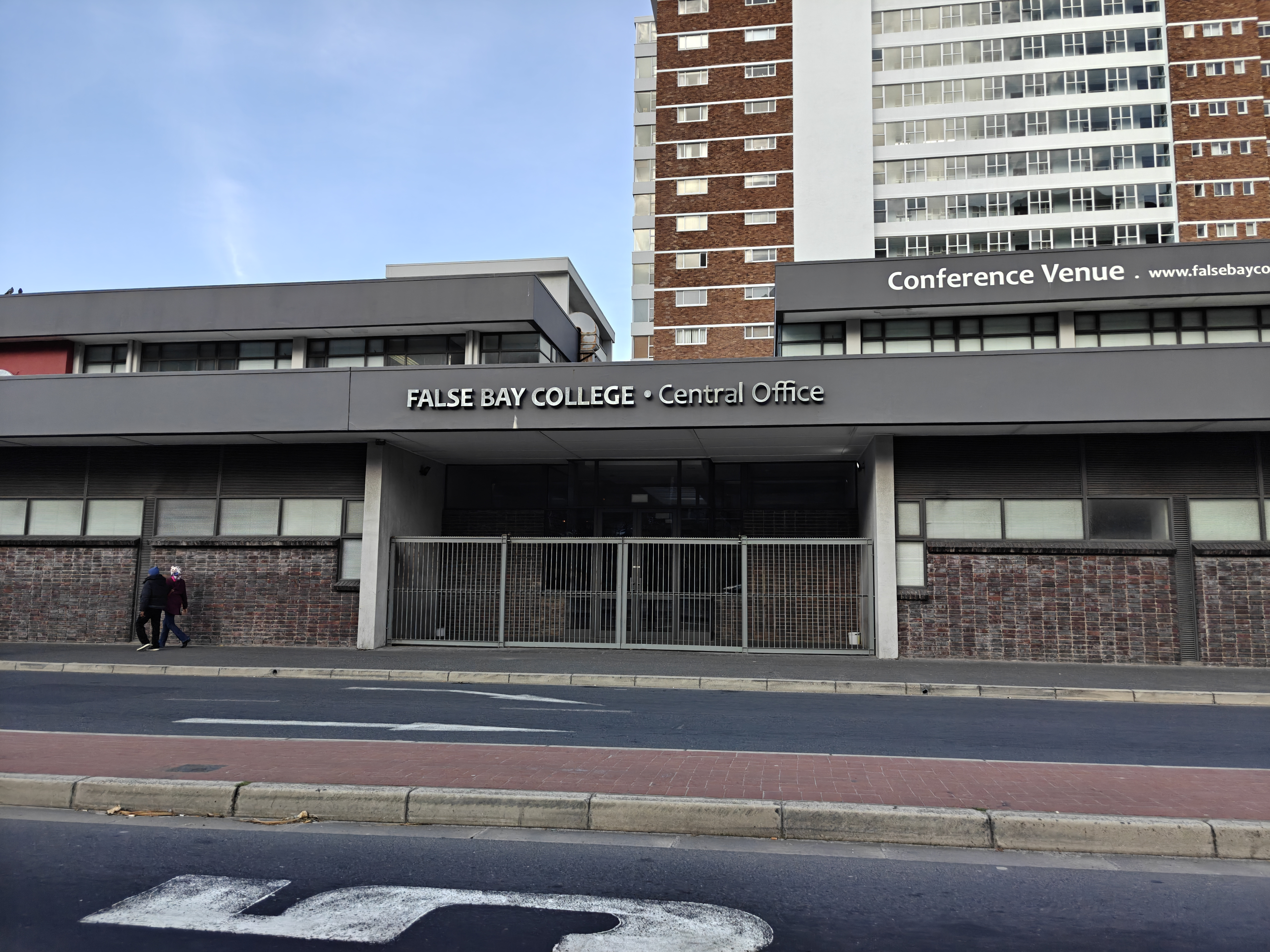
- False Bay College's Muizenberg campus
- Motto: My dream. My college
- Type: Public
- Established: 2002; 24 years ago
- Academic affiliations: Department of Higher Education and Training (DHET)
- Principal: Charlene Matthews
- Academic staff: 421 (2026)
- Postgraduates: 11,000 (2026)
- Location: Main campus: 131 Main Road, Muizenberg, Cape Town, 7945, Western Cape, South Africa
- Campus: Five urban campuses
- Language: English
- Colours: Blue and red
- Mascot: MO
- Website: falsebaycollege.co.za

False Bay College (FBC) is a public tertiary education institution in Cape Town, South Africa, operating across five campuses. It is classified as a technical and vocational college (TVET).

The college offers vocational, occupational, and skills programs in a range of fields, including engineering, business, hospitality, information technology, safety in society, education, 2D animation, tourism, and boat building. FBC is the only institution in South Africa to provide training in yacht and boat building.

== History ==
False Bay College was founded in 2002, through the merger of Good Hope Community College, South Peninsula College, and Westlake Technical College.

In February 2017, False Bay College opened a new campus in Mitchell's Plain, built at an underutilized site that used to house a primary school. The Western Cape Government renovated the old school at a cost of R3.5 million, to create a new, green college campus, positioned close to public transit. The new campus was built to address demand for tertiary and vocational education in the area.

In 2018, The Department of Higher Education and Training (DHET) launched the Pre-Vocational Learning Program (PLP) Pilot Project, with the participation of nine colleges, one of which was False Bay College. The institution enrolled 62 students at its Khayelitsha Campus, and was recognized as that year's Overall Top-performing College.

== Campuses ==
False Bay College has five campuses.

Campus	Coordinates
Khayelitsha	34°2′58″S 18°39′15″E
Fish Hoek	34°8′16″S 18°25′26″E
Mitchell's Plain	34°3′37″S 18°37′13″E
Muizenberg (main)	34°6′26″S 18°28′7″E
Westlake	34°4′38″S 18°26′25″E
