= Wolfgat Nature Reserve =

Coastal nature reserve in Mitchells Plain, Cape Town, South Africa

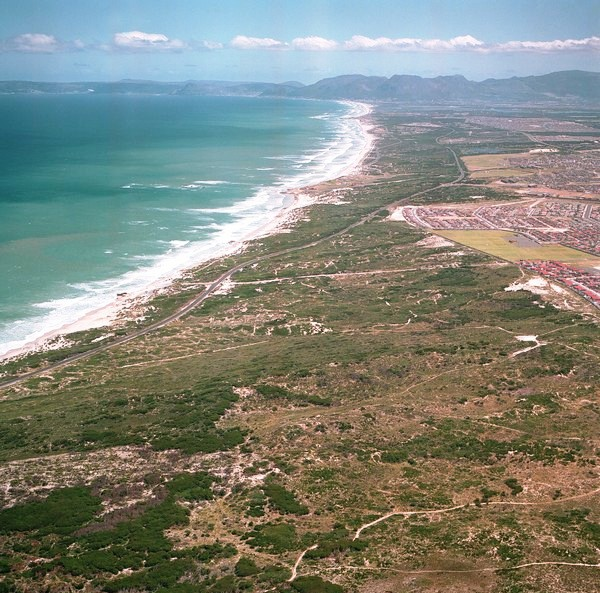
- Aerial view of the Wolfgat Nature Reserve

- Location within Cape Town
- Location: Mitchells Plain, South Africa
- Coordinates: 34.0697°S 18.6482°E
- Area: 248 ha (610 acres)

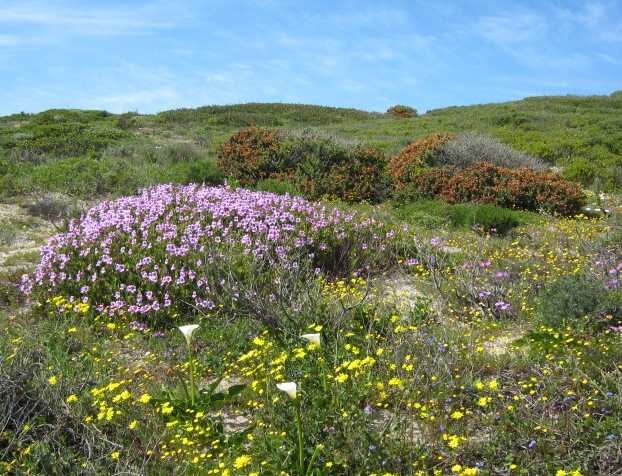
The endangered Cape Dune vegetation at Wolfgat Nature Reserve.

Wolfgat Nature Reserve is a coastal nature reserve in Mitchells Plain on False Bay in the Western Cape, South Africa.

This conservation area consists of 248 ha (610 acres) of endangered dune vegetation and limestone cliffs, extending along a portion of the False Bay coastline. The Cape Flats Dune Strandveld vegetation in this reserve contains over 150 plant species. These include evergreen shrubs, flowering succulents, arum lilies and a variety of daisy species. Birds such as kelp gulls and black oystercatchers nest here.

A major threat to the reserve is the invasive alien Acacia cyclops (“rooikrans”) tree. This weed has spread across large parts of the coastline, smothering and killing local vegetation and upsetting coastal ecosystems. Wolfgat Nature Reserve is managed by the city of Cape Town, in partnership with the local communities of Khayelitsha and Mitchell’s Plein.

The name Wolfgat means "wolf cave", and refers to the brown hyena or strandwolf which existed here until the 19th century. An ancient fossilised den of this species was discovered here in the 1960s and the stretch of coast was named after this discovery.

== See also ==
- Biodiversity of Cape Town
- List of nature reserves in Cape Town
- Cape Flats Dune Strandveld
