= Westgate, Mitchells Plain =

Suburb of Western Cape, South Africa

Westgate
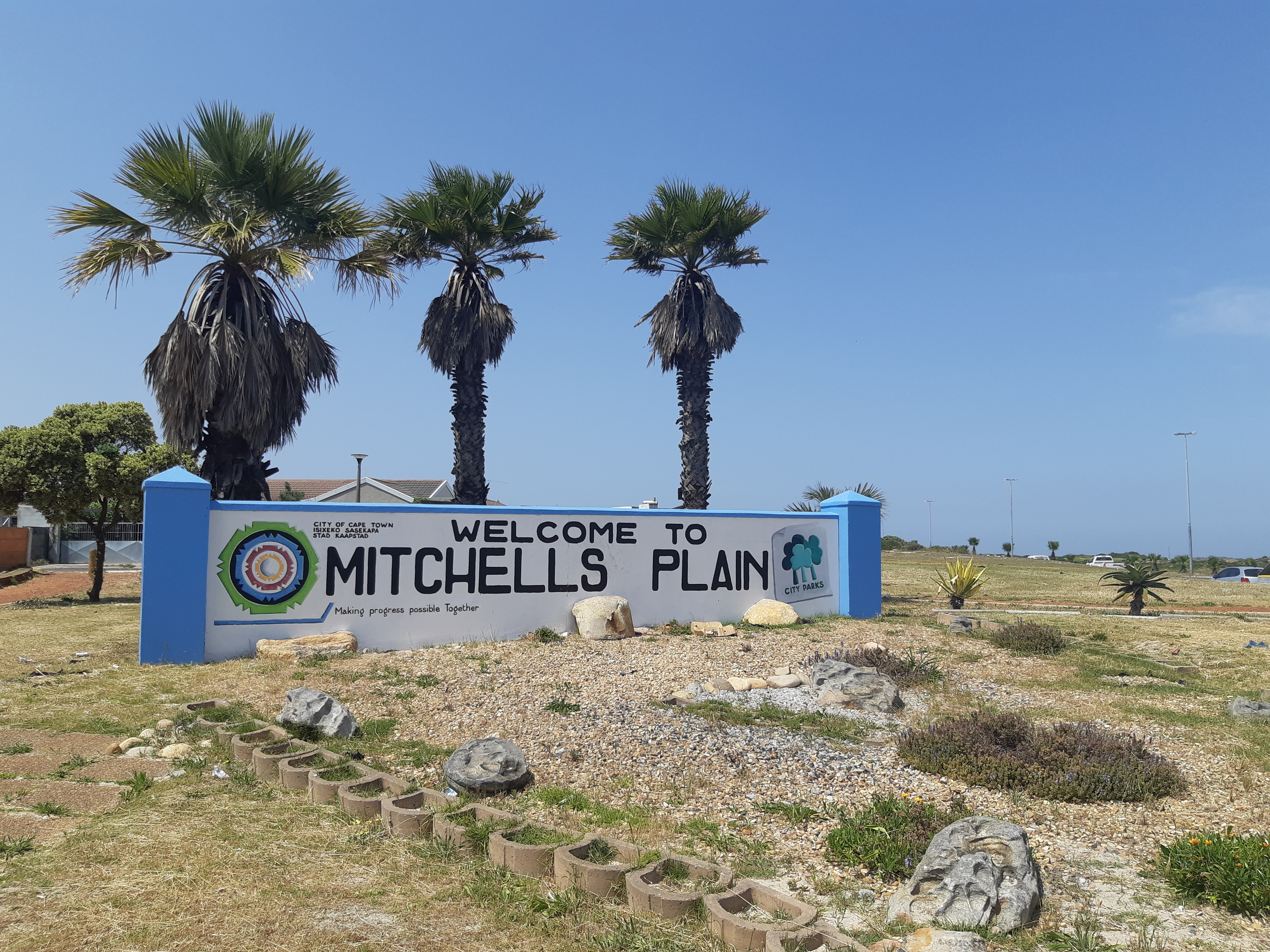
- The "Welcome to Mitchells Plain" sign located in the north western corner of Westgate just across the road from Westgate mall.

- Location within Western Cape Location within South Africa
- Coordinates: 34.048°S 18.588°E
- Country: South Africa
- Province: Western Cape
- Municipality: City of Cape Town
- Main Place: Mitchells Plain, Cape Town

Area
  - Total: 0.73 km^{2} (0.28 sq mi)

Population (2011)
  - Total: 3,361
  - Density: 4,600/km^{2} (12,000/sq mi)

Racial makeup (2011)
  - Black African: 11.07%
  - Coloured: 86.31%
  - Indian/Asian: 0.83%
  - White: 0.15%
  - Other: 1.64%

First languages (2011)
  - Afrikaans: 12.59%
  - English: 82.56%
  - IsiXhosa: 2.56%
- Time zone: UTC+2 (SAST)

Westgate is a neighbourhood in the central western part of the Mitchells Plain urban area of the City of Cape Town in the Western Cape province of South Africa. Westgate Mall is immediately north of the neighbourhood, on the other side of Morgenster Road.
