= The Road to Mandalay =

The Road to Mandalay can refer to:

- "Mandalay" (poem), of 1890 by Rudyard Kipling, whose chorus begins "On the road to Mandalay"
- "On the Road to Mandalay" (song), a 1907 musical setting by Oley Speaks of the Kipling poem
- The Road to Mandalay, a 1917 novel by Bithia Mary Croker
- The Road to Mandalay (1926 film), a 1926 film directed by Tod Browning
- The Road to Mandalay (2016 film), a 2016 film directed by Midi Z
- "The Road to Mandalay" (song), a 2000 song by Robbie Williams
- "Road to Mandalay", a 2024 song by Laurie Anderson

== See also ==
- Belmond Road to Mandalay, a river cruiser in Myanmar (Burma) that plies the Ayeyarwady (Irrawaddy) River
