= Mândra (disambiguation) =

Mândra or Mîndra may refer to several places:

In Romania:

- Mândra, a commune in Brașov County
- Mândra, a village in Bârla commune, Argeș County
- Mândra, a village in Loamneș commune, Sibiu County
- Mândra, a tributary of the Argeș in Argeș County
- Mândra (Olt), a tributary of the Olt in Brașov County
- Mândra, a tributary of the Păscoaia in Vâlcea County

In Moldova:

- Mîndra, a village in Hîrjauca commune, Călărași district
- Mîndra, a village in Ratuș commune, Telenești district

== See also ==
- Mandra (disambiguation)
