= Beacon Valley, Mitchells Plain =

Suburb of Cape Town, in Western Cape, South Africa

Beacon Valley
- Location within Western Cape Location within South Africa
- Coordinates: 34.040°S 18.625°E
- Country: South Africa
- Province: Western Cape
- Municipality: City of Cape Town
- Main Place: Mitchells Plain, Cape Town

Area
  - Total: 1.9 km^{2} (0.73 sq mi)

Population (2011)
  - Total: 28,884
  - Density: 15,000/km^{2} (39,000/sq mi)

Racial makeup (2011)
  - Black African: 4.74%
  - Coloured: 93.58%
  - Indian/Asian: 0.43%
  - White: 0.21%
  - Other: 1.05%

First languages (2011)
  - Afrikaans: 59.65%
  - English: 35.94%
  - isiXhosa: 1.33%
- Time zone: UTC+2 (SAST)

Beacon Valley is a neighborhood in the central eastern part of the Mitchells Plain urban area of the City of Cape Town in the Western Cape province of South Africa, just north and north east of the town centre.
