= Mandala (disambiguation) =

Mandala is a geometric configuration of symbols used in various spiritual traditions.

Mandala may also refer to:

== Geography ==
- The Mandala, a famous boulder problem in Bishop, California
- Blantyre, a city in Malawi, also called Mandala
- Puncak Mandala, a mountain in Pegunungan Bintang Regency, Highland Papua, Indonesia

=== Geopolitical history ===
- Rajamandala, a political model in ancient South Asia
- Mandala (political model), a political model in medieval Southeast Asia
- Mandal, another word for Tehsil, an administrative division of some countries of South Asia
- Monthon, a former subdivision of Thailand

== People ==
- Mark Mandala (died 2009), American television executive and President of the ABC
- Tommy Suharto (Hutomo Mandala Putra, born 1962), Indonesian businessman and politician

== Literature ==
- The 10 books of the Rigveda, a Hindu religious text
- Mandala (novel) by Pearl S. Buck

== Film and television ==
- The Devil's Sword, a 1984 Indonesian film that centers on the comic book character Mandala
- "Mandala" (Breaking Bad), the eleventh episode of the second season of Breaking Bad
- Mandala (film), a 1981 Korean film
- Mandala (TV series), a 1987 Brazilian telenovela

== Music ==
- Mandalaband, a British progressive rock band
- Mandala (band), a Canadian R&B and soul band from the 1960s
- Mandala (Rx Bandits album), 2009
- Mandala (Kitarō album), 1994

== Other uses ==
- Tigerair Mandala, a low-cost airline based in Indonesia
- Mandala Stadium, a football stadium in Jayapura, Indonesia
- Mandal (disambiguation)

== See also ==
- Mandali (disambiguation)
- Mandalika (disambiguation)
- Mandara (disambiguation)
- Mandela (disambiguation)
  - Nelson Mandela, anti-apartheid revolutionary, president of South Africa
