= Mandira =

Mandira may refer to:

- Mandir, a Sanskrit word meaning temple
- Mandir (film), a 1937 Indian film
- Mandira (film), a 1990 Indian Bengali-language film
- Mandira (instrument), Indian musical instrument consisting of a pair of metal bowls used for rhythm effect mainly used in India and Bangladesh
- Mandira Dam, a dam in Orissa state, India
- Mandıra, Sındırgı, village in Turkey
- Mandira Bedi (born 1972), Indian actress
- Mandira Khan, a fictional character from the 2010 Indian film My Name Is Khan, portrayed by Kajol

== See also ==
- Mandar (disambiguation)
- Mandara (disambiguation)
- Mandra (disambiguation)
- Mandhira Punnagai (disambiguation)
