= Mandar =

Mandar may refer to:

- Mandar people, a population in the province of West Sulawesi, Indonesia
- Mandar language, an Austronesian language spoken by the Mandar in West Sulawesi, Indonesia
- Mandar (given name), a masculine Indian given name
- Mandar (Vidhan Sabha constituency), a constituency of the Jharkhand Vidhan Sabha, Ranchi district, Jharkhand, India
- Mandar block, an administrative blocks of Ranchi district, Jharkhand state, India
- Mandar, Ranchi, village in Ranchi district, Jharkhand, India
- Mandanr, Pashtun tribe

== See also ==
- Manda (disambiguation)
- Mandira (disambiguation)
- Mandara (disambiguation)
- Mandra (disambiguation)
- Mandar Parvat, a small mountain in Banka district, Bhagalpur division, Bihar, India
- Mandarabad or Mandar Abad, a village in Qazvin Province, Iran
- Polewali Mandar, a regency in West Sulawesi province, Indonesia
