= Mandar (given name) =

- Gender: Male
- Language: Sanskrit

Origin
- Meaning: Tree of heaven
- Region of origin: India

Other names
- Popularity: see popular names

Mandar is an Indian male given name, popular in the state of Maharashtra, which is one of the names of Lord Ganesha, and may also mean "coral tree" or "tree in heaven".

Mandar may refer to:

== People with the given name ==
- Mandar Agashe (born 1969), Indian businessman
- Mandar Chandwadkar (born 1976), Indian actor
- Mandar Madhukar Deshmukh (born 1974), Indian physicist
- Mandar Rao Desai (born 1992), Indian football player

== See also ==
- Mandar (disambiguation)
