= The Rangoon Sisters =

2020 cookbook by Amy and Emily Chung

The Rangoon Sisters: Recipes from Our Burmese Family Kitchen
- Author: Amy Chung and Emily Chung
- Publisher: Ebury Press
- Publication date: 30 July 2020
- Publication place: United Kingdom
- Pages: 224
- ISBN: 9781529103205

The Rangoon Sisters: Recipes from our Burmese Family Kitchen is a Burmese cookbook written by British-Burmese sisters Amy and Emily Chung. The book was published by Ebury Press in July 2020 and was named one of National Geographic's 12 best cookbooks of 2020, one of The Times of India's top culinary books of 2020, and one of The Observer Food Monthly's top 10 great food books of 2020, as well as being shortlisted for the Debut Cookery Book category in the Fortnum & Mason 2021 Food and Drink Awards.

== Background ==
Amy and Emily Chung were born in South London. Their mother's family hails from Dawei in the south of Myanmar, and their maternal grandparents then moved to Yangon, where their mother was born. The sisters have Anglo-Burmese-Chinese heritage. They are both doctors in the NHS; Emily is a consultant in sexual health and HIV, and Amy is a registrar in psychiatry. They were inspired to start hosting a supper club showcasing Burmese cuisine after they returned to the UK from their first trip to Myanmar in 2012, as a way of paying homage to their heritage. The club was first hosted in London in 2013, and received critical acclaim in 2017 when Grace Dent named their mohinga as the best thing she ate in 2017, describing it as "joyous". In 2018, The Rangoon Sisters supper club was listed on The Observer Food Monthly's list of Everything we love in the world of food right now. Profits from the supper club are distributed to a number of charities, and it has raised over £10,000 as of July 2020.

The sisters wrote their debut cookbook over a period of two years while working, featuring recipes used in the supper club as well as introducing new recipes, and aimed to make them accessible to all levels of home cooks.

== Reception ==
The Rangoon Sisters was praised for its down-to-earth and homely approach to cooking, as well as being an accessible introduction to Burmese cuisine. National Geographic described the book as "an essential guide to Myanmar's food". Allan Jenkins and Molly Tait-Hyland, writing for The Observer Food Monthly, described it as "Bright and beautiful and full of dishes I want to eat...this book is a joy".

== See also ==
- Mandalay: Recipes and Tales from a Burmese Kitchen
