= Mandalika =

Mandalika may refer to:

- Mandalika I, Chudasama king, reigned 1294–1306 CE
- Mandalika II, Chudasama king, reigned 1397–1400 CE
- Mandalika III, Chudasama king, reigned 1451–1472 CE
- Mandalika International Street Circuit, a circuit in the island of Lombok, Indonesia
- Mandalika (resort area), a resort area in the island of Lombok, Indonesia
- Mandalika Island, a small island in Java Sea, Indonesia
- Princess Mandalika, whose drowning and reincarnation is commemorated in the Nyale Festival on Lombok, Indonesia

== See also ==
- Mandala (disambiguation)
