= Eastridge, Mitchells Plain =

Suburb of Cape Town, in Western Cape, South Africa

Eastridge
- Location within Western Cape Location within South Africa
- Coordinates: 34.050°S 18.627°E
- Country: South Africa
- Province: Western Cape
- Municipality: City of Cape Town
- Main Place: Mitchells Plain, Cape Town

Area
  - Total: 1.61 km^{2} (0.62 sq mi)

Population (2011)
  - Total: 28,482
  - Density: 17,700/km^{2} (45,800/sq mi)

Racial makeup (2011)
  - Black African: 4.53%
  - Coloured: 94.15%
  - Indian/Asian: 0.93%
  - White: 0.04%
  - Other: 0.93%

First languages (2011)
  - Afrikaans: 65.55%
  - English: 31.47%
  - Other: 1.21%
- Time zone: UTC+2 (SAST)

Eastridge is a neighborhood in the Mitchells Plain urban area of the City of Cape Town in the Western Cape province of South Africa.
