= Mandara =

Mandara is an ethnic group and a language family in West Africa. It is also an alternative spelling of "mandarah", referring to a guest room in Middle Eastern buildings, especially in Egypt.

Additionally, it may refer to:

== West Africa ==
- Mandara languages is one of the group of Chadic languages
- Mandara Kingdom of Cameroon
- Mandara Mountains of Cameroon
- Mandara people, also called the Mandrawa, of northern Cameroon and northeastern Nigeria

== Other ==
- El Mandara, a neighbourhood in Alexandria, Egypt
- Bali Mandara Toll Road, an elevated toll road in Bali, Indonesia
- Mandara or Mandala, Hindu and Buddhist religious object or symbol
- Mandara people (Australia), an Australian Aboriginal tribe
- Mandara tree, the legume Erythrina stricta
- Mandaraba tree, the Indian Coral Tree (Erythrina variegata)
- The crown flower plant Calotropis gigantea
- Mount Mandara, a mythical mountain in the Hindu Puranas
- Mandara (film), a 2024 Sri Lankan Sinhala-language film
- Mandara (TV series), a German television series
- Mandara language, an Austronesian language spoken on the Tabar Group of islands, New Ireland Province, Papua New Guinea
- Mandara Spa, a global spa management company founded in Bali and now under the company Steiner Leisure Limited

== See also ==
- Mandala (disambiguation)
- Mandar (disambiguation)
- Mandira (disambiguation)
