= Woodlands, Mitchells Plain =

Suburb of Cape Town, in Western Cape, South Africa

Woodlands
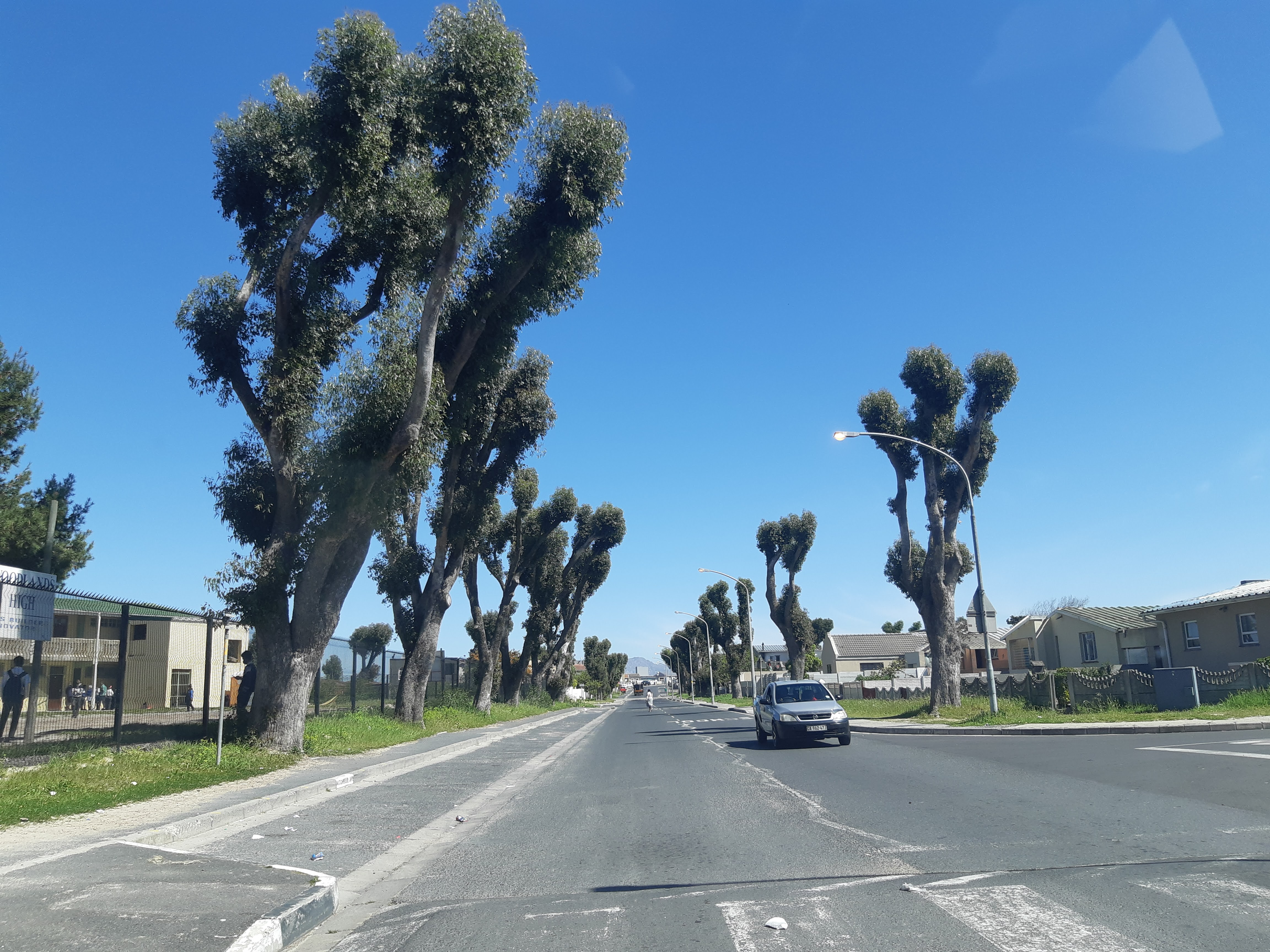
- A view down Mitchell Avenue in Woodlands.

- Location within Western Cape Location within South Africa
- Coordinates: 34.036°S 18.598°E
- Country: South Africa
- Province: Western Cape
- Municipality: City of Cape Town
- Main Place: Mitchells Plain, Cape Town

Area
  - Total: 2.4 km^{2} (0.93 sq mi)

Population (2011)
  - Total: 23,213
  - Density: 9,700/km^{2} (25,000/sq mi)

Racial makeup (2011)
  - Black African: 6.06%
  - Coloured: 92.25%
  - Indian/Asian: 0.44%
  - White: 0.16%
  - Other: 1.09%

First languages (2011)
  - Afrikaans: 45.81%
  - English: 51.45%
  - Sign language: 0.41%
- Time zone: UTC+2 (SAST)

Woodlands is a neighborhood in the central western part of the Mitchells Plain urban area of the City of Cape Town in the Western Cape province of South Africa.
