= Mandalay: Recipes and Tales from a Burmese Kitchen =

2020 cookbook by MiMi Aye

- Author: MiMi Aye
- Subject: Cookery
- Publisher: Bloomsbury Absolute
- Publication date: 2019
- Publication place: United Kingdom
- Pages: 271
- ISBN: 9781472959492

Mandalay: Recipes and Tales from a Burmese Kitchen is a Burmese cookbook written by the British-Burmese author MiMi Aye. The book was published by Bloomsbury Absolute in 2019, and was recognised by critics as an "introduction for many to an underappreciated cuisine". Mandalay was named as one of the Financial Times' Books of the Summer, one of The Observer's 20 Best Food Books of 2019, and was nominated as a finalist for the Guild of Food Writers Awards.

== Background ==
MiMi Aye was born in Margate to Burmese parents, who had emigrated from Myanmar to England three months before her birth. Her mother's family is native to Mogok, near Shan State, and her father's hails from Mandalay. Her interest in Burmese culture and food was instilled in her by her parents, who were fearful of her losing touch with her Burmese origins. Her parents encouraged her and her siblings to speak Burmese at home, and her mother frequently cooked Burmese food for her family.

Aye first started food writing through her food blog meemalee, which she started as a hobby in February 2009. As she expanded activities onto Twitter, she began to receive many questions about Burmese food, which inspired her to write more formally about Burmese food and culture on her blog.

Aye was offered a deal by Bloomsbury Absolute to write Mandalay - Recipes and Tales from a Burmese Kitchen at the end of 2017. She took a sabbatical from her job as a legal editor to write it, and Mandalay was published in June 2019.

== Contents ==
Mandalay begins with an introduction describing Aye's family history and featuring images of her time in Myanmar, to provide context and background for the food and recipes given later in the book. There are also introductory sections on "The Food of Burma", "Eating and Serving Customs" and "Equipment in the Burmese Kitchen", as well as an essay by Aye on the importance of MSG in Burmese cooking, aiming to dispel myths about its potential dangers and defend its use. The recipe book itself is divided into chapters based on the types of food covered, such as fritters, rice dishes, noodles and pickles and chutneys. Each recipe is headed with its name in English, Burmese and romanized Burmese, and begins with an introductory paragraph by Aye on its importance and place in Burmese cuisine (and occasionally her own family), as well as mentioning any variations on the dish that may exist.

== Reception ==
Mandalay was widely praised by food critics as an authentic and personal introduction to Burmese cuisine, being described as "a book that opens up an entirely new cuisine to us", with "recipes that combine the deliverable with the authentic" by Tim Hayward, writing for the Financial Times. Nigella Lawson has chosen Mandalay as one of her "Cookbooks of the Month", and it, along with Aye's recipe for Burmese Fried Chicken, is featured on the Cookbook Corner section of her website. She described Mandalay as "a really loving and hungry-making introduction to a fascinating cuisine." The Observer described Aye as a "gifted recipe writer" and highlighted the recipes for mohinga and duck egg curry as particularly notable. Aye has appeared on the BBC Radio 4 Woman's Hour to promote Mandalay and cook the Red Prawn Curry featured in the book.

== See also ==
- The Rangoon Sisters: Recipes from Our Burmese Family Kitchen
