= Westridge, Mitchells Plain =

Suburb of Cape Town, in Western Cape, South Africa

Westridge
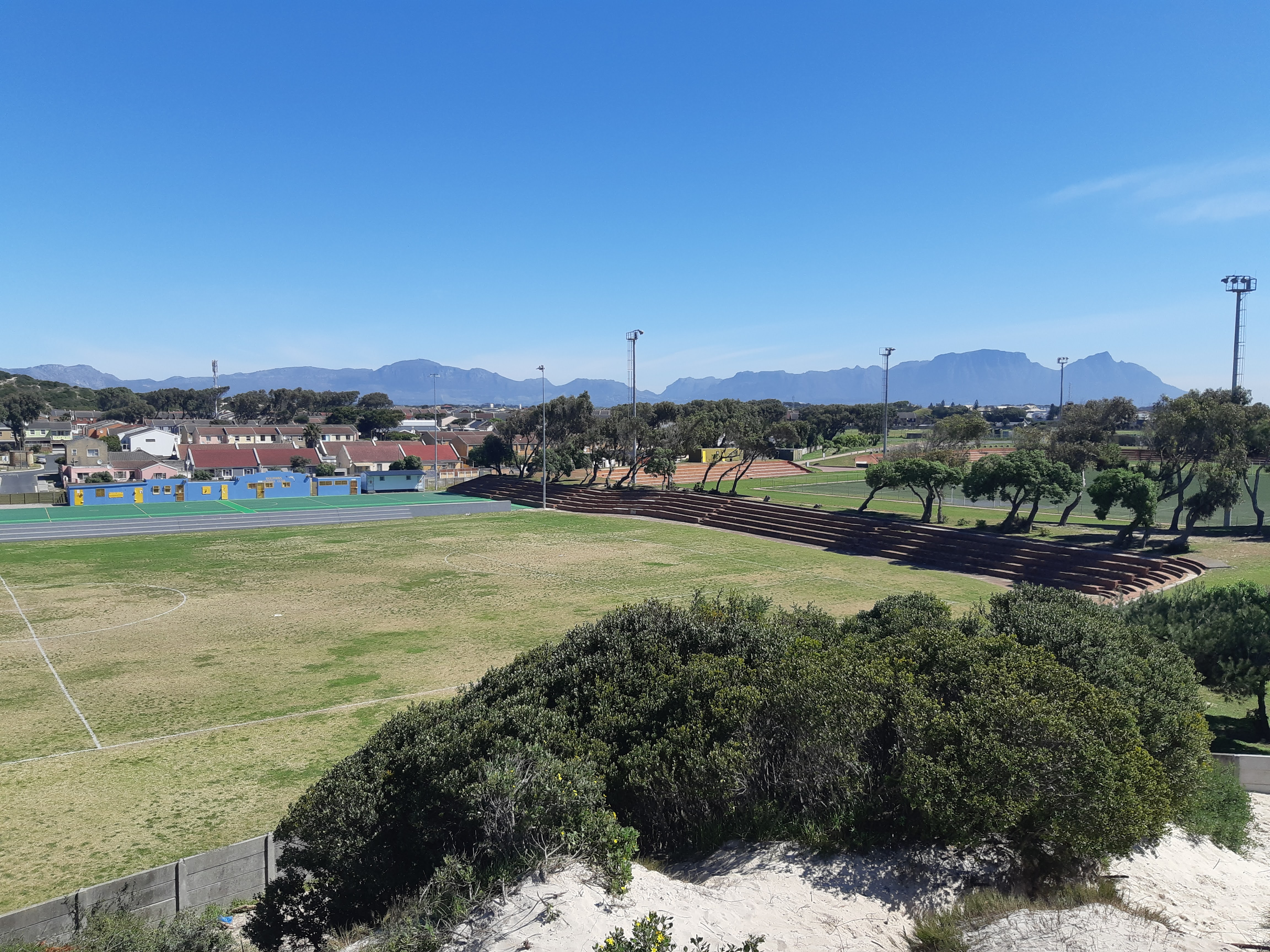
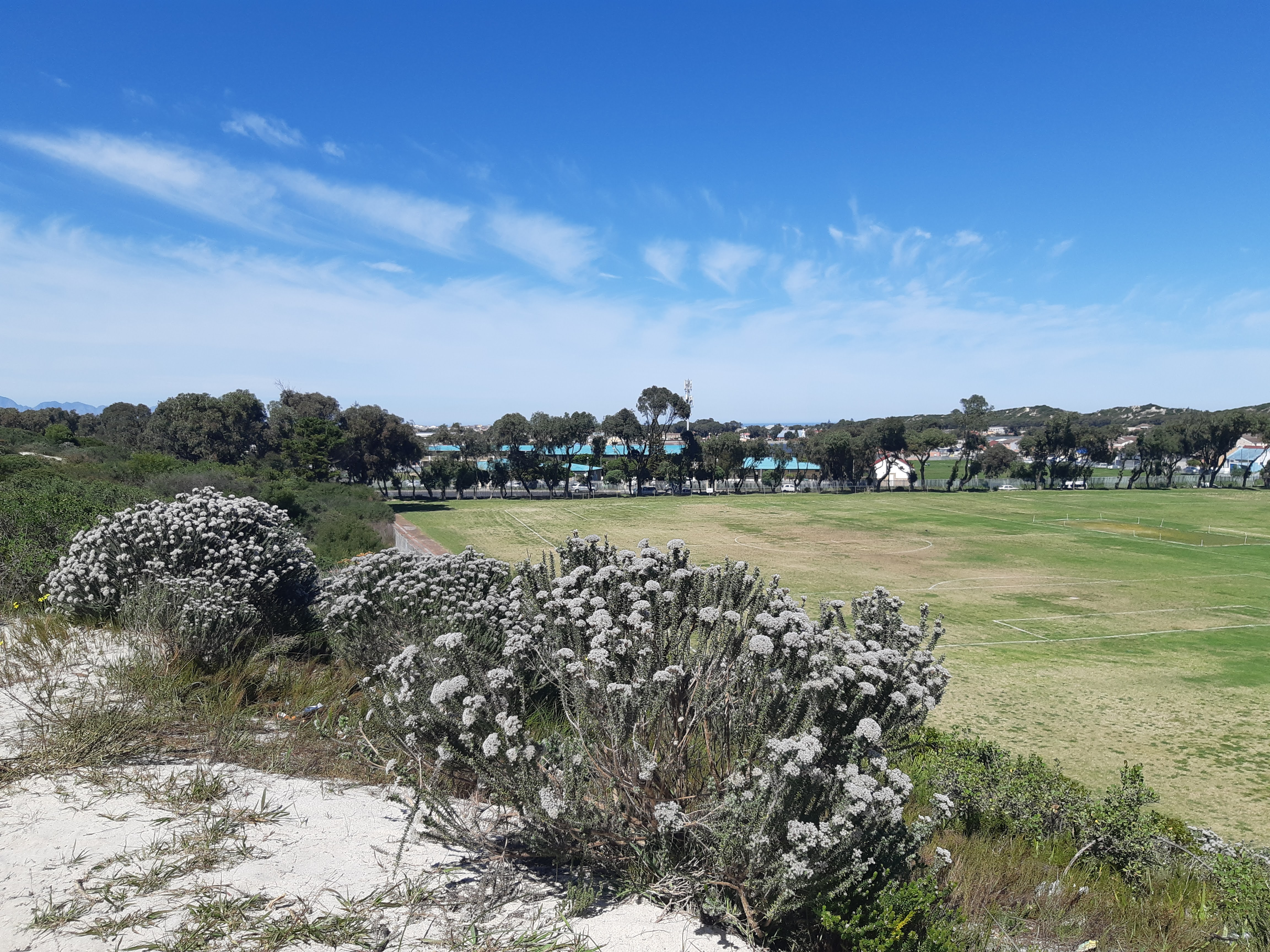
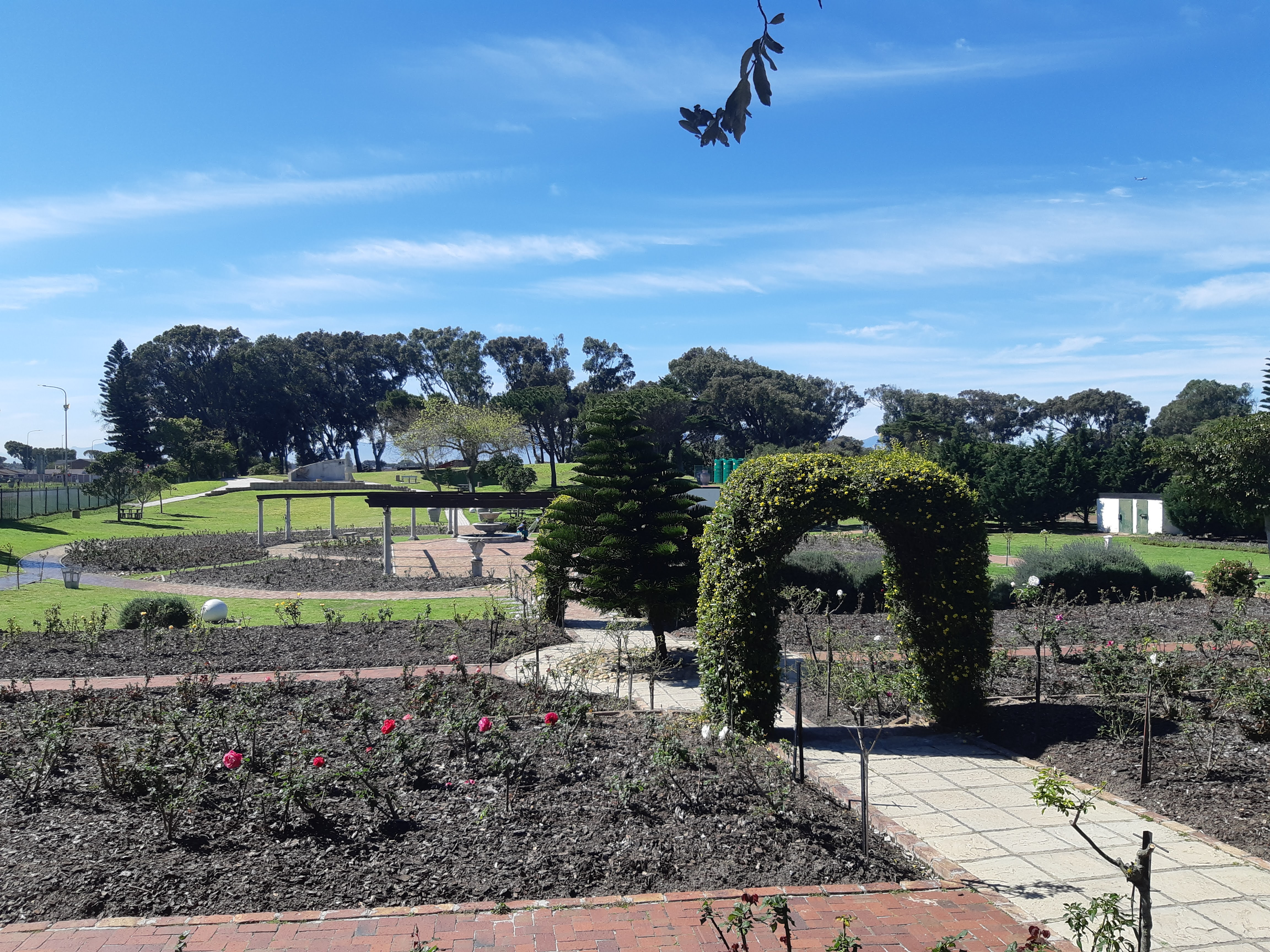
- Views of Westridge from the Westridge Gardens.

- Location within Western Cape Location within South Africa
- Coordinates: 34.050°S 18.601°E
- Country: South Africa
- Province: Western Cape
- Municipality: City of Cape Town
- Main Place: Mitchells Plain, Cape Town

Area
  - Total: 2.28 km^{2} (0.88 sq mi)

Population (2011)
  - Total: 19,373
  - Density: 8,500/km^{2} (22,000/sq mi)

Racial makeup (2011)
  - Black African: 5.16%
  - Coloured: 92.62%
  - Indian/Asian: 0.37%
  - White: 0.18%
  - Other: 1.68%

First languages (2011)
  - Afrikaans: 24.71%
  - English: 72.14%
  - IsiXhosa: 0.96%
- Time zone: UTC+2 (SAST)

Westridge is a neighbourhood in the western part of the Mitchells Plain urban area of the City of Cape Town in the Western Cape province of South Africa. The Westridge Gardens, which hosts several indigenous Cape Flats fynbos species, is an important large public park in the area, in the north of Westridge.

Educational institutions in Westridge include:

- Westridge High School
- Beacon School for LSEN
- Duneside Primary School
- Westville Primary School
- Ridgeville Primary School
- Mitchell's Plain Primary School
- Parkhurst Primary School
- Harvester Primary School
