= Bandeli =

Bandeli بندلي
- Village
- Location within Iran
- Coordinates: 38°54′53″N 44°47′43″E
- Country: Iran
- Province: West Azerbaijan
- County: Chaypareh
- Bakhsh: Central
- Rural District: Bastam

Population (2006)
  - Total: 89
- Time zone: UTC+3:30 (IRST)
  - Summer (DST): UTC+4:30 (IRDT)

Bandeli (Persian: بندلي, also romanized as Bandelī; also known as Mandalī) is a village in Bastam Rural District, in the Central District of Chaypareh County, West Azerbaijan Province, Iran. At the time of the 2006 census, its population was 89 across 23 families.
