= Mondale High School =

Public high school in Cape Town, South Africa

Coordinates: 34°03′19″S 18°36′58″E

- Cape Town; South Africa

Information
- Type: Public high school
- Motto: Monte desus (French: soar upwards)
- Established: 1982
- School district: Mitchell's Plain
- Principal: Mrs Hendricks (Head Principal – May 2024 – Present); Mr Bridgens (Head Principal – retired: April 2024)
- Grades: 8–9 (senior phase) 10–12 (FET phase)
- Enrollment: 1300
- Colors: Royal Blue Yellow White
- Website: Official Website

Mondale High School is a school in the Western Cape, South Africa. The school was founded in 1982.

The school's name is derived from the names of two roads running adjacent to the school: Montague drive and Merrydale avenue.

Fees are R 2,717 (approx. $247) but collection is very poor as it serves a community where there are very high rates of crime and unemployment. Despite this, academic performance is very good with a 100% pass rate in the NSC examinations in 2015. The school has also won the A-section athletics competition 23 times in the last 25 years. It has produced 13 provincial athletes and soccer players who have played in the Premier League and for the national team. It has also performed well in provincial quiz competitions, winning twice.

== Academics ==
Mondale is renowned for its academic excellence. Despite the fact that it is situated in a poverty-stricken area, it still maintains a high matric pass rate. Here is Mondale High School pass rate:

Year	Total student/ matriculants	Percentage Pass rate
2025	245	97.6
2024	250	99.2
2023	246	98.0
2022	256	96.6
2021	228	98.3
2020	236	99.6
2019	259	98.1
2018	254	100
2017	217	98.6
2016	239	99. 6
2015	------	100
2014	245	97.6
2013	246	99.6
2012	213	95.3
2011	164	95.1
2010	239	90.4
2009	240	92.1
2008	242	97.5
2007	236	91.1
2006	209	96.7
2005	219	97.3
2004	196	99
2003	229	99.6
2002	177	97.7
2001	214	99.1
2000	210	96.7

=== Other academic achievements ===
Awards for Academic Excellence

National award for most improved school in Western Cape
Provincial award for Academic Excellence
Liam Baker 99% for Mathematics in 2009
Argus Quiz 2012 runners-up

Cape Town Junior City Council (J.C.C.)

2009/2010

Monique Petersen

Joretha Houlies

Navelle Abrahams

Demi-lee Adonis

2012/2013

Thandokazi Sineke – Junior Mayor (J.C.C.)

Argus quiz competition / Rotary high school competition

1994

Semi finalists

1995

Champions

Sadeeqah Phillips

Yumna Abdurahman

Naseem Fataar

Theodore Jones

1996

Champions

Cape Argus quiz competition

2012

Runner Up 2nd place

Craig Bowers

Chanelle Petersen

Lisa Felton

Nicole Soloman

Kaylin Joshua

2013

5th Place

SAIPA (South Africa Institute of Professional Accountants)

Top performers: Dinaledi School (Western Cape) Provincial Award

1st Timwen Hendricks – Mondale High

2nd Mishka Isaacs – Mondale High

3rd Tiffany Klink – Mondale High

UCT Mathematics

2007 Liam Baker (grade 10B)

Member of the W.C. math team

3rd place

Gold medal

2008 Liam Baker (grade 11)

Gold 1st in Western Province

South African Mathematics team – Madrid (Spain)

Pan African Olympaid – Contonou (Benin)

2009 Liam Baker (grade 12)

Gold 2nd in Western Province

South African Mathematics team – Austria

International Olympaid – Bremem Germany

De Beer English Olympiad Award

Matthew Jones – Silver 70%

Sage Davidson – Bronze 60%+

Elethea Barkley – Bronze 60%+

Nicolette Bergsman – Bronze 60%+

Nikita Killian – Bronze 60%+

Chad Klaasen – Bronze 60%+

Cruscenda Witbooi – Bronze 60%+

Marco Lawrence – Bronze 60%+

Zaahir Abdurahman – Bronze 60%+

In 2015 the matric pass rate results were 99.2% (2 pupil failed English), thus being in second place in Mitchell's Plain after Spine Road High achieved 99.3%, the difference being 0.1%. Due to a remark of the English papers, the pupil who failed were said to have passed. This putting Mondale on top of the chart achieving 100%.

== Sports ==
Not only is Mondale good at academics but also excels in sporting codes. The school has also won the A-section athletics competition 23 times in the last 25 years. It has produced 13 provincial athletes and soccer players who have played in the Premier League and for the national team.

2016 – Champions A-section (Southern Zone) W.P.S.S.S.U.

2015 – Champions A-section (Southern Zone) W.P.S.S.S.U.

2014 – Champions A-section (Southern Zone) W.P.S.S.S.U.

2013 – Champions A-section (Southern Zone) W.P.S.S.S.U.

2012 – Champions A-section (False Bay / Southern Zone) W.P.S.S.S.U.

2011 – Champions A-section (False Bay / Southern Zone) W.P.S.S.S.U.

2010 – Champions A-section (False Bay / Southern Zone) W.P.S.S.S.U.

2009 – 2nd Place A-section (False Bay / Southern Zone) W.P.S.S.S.U.

2008 – Champions A-section (False Bay / Southern Zone) W.P.S.S.S.U.

2007 – Champions A-section (False Bay / Southern Zone) W.P.S.S.S.U.

2006 – Champions A-section (False Bay / Southern Zone) W.P.S.S.S.U.

2005 – Champions A-section (False Bay Zone) W.P.S.S.S.U.

2004 – Champions A-section (False Bay Zone) W.P.S.S.S.U.

2003 – Champions A-section (False Bay Zone) W.P.S.S.S.U.

2002 – Champions A-section (False Bay Zone) W.P.S.S.S.U.

2001 – Champions A-section (False Bay Zone) W.P.S.S.S.U.

2000 – Champions A-section (False Bay Zone) W.P.S.S.S.U.

1999 – 2nd Place A-section (False Bay Zone ) W.P.S.S.S.U.

1998 – Winners A-section (False Bay Zone ) W.P.S.S.S.U.

1997 – Winners A-section (False Bay Zone ) W.P.S.S.S.U.

1996 – Winners A-section (False Bay Zone ) W.P.S.S.S.U.

1995 – The Stainer Shield Athletic Champions (Pinelands/Plumstead/Westerford/Mondale)

1994 – The Stainer Shield Athletic Champions (Pinelands/Plumstead/Westerford/Mondale)

1993 – The Stainer Shield Athletic Champions (Pinelands/Plumstead/Westerford/Mondale)

1992 – The Stainer Shield Athletic Champions (Pinelands/Plumstead/Westerford/Mondale)

1991 – Winners A-section – Champion of Champions Athletic Winners

1990 – Winners A-section – Champion of Champions Athletic Winners

1989 – Winners A-section – Champion of Champions Athletic Winners

1988 – Winners A-section – Champion of Champions Athletic Winners

1987 – Winners A-section – Champion of Champions Athletic Winners

== Subjects ==
=== Senior phase (grades 8 and 9) ===
These subjects are offered to both grades 8 and 9 with no selective subjects:

- English (Home Language)
- Afrikaans (First Additional Language)
- Mathematics
- Economics and Management Sciences (EMS)
- Social Sciences (History and Geography)
- Natural Sciences
- Technology
- Creative Arts (Drama and Visual Arts)
- Life Orientation

=== Further education and training (FET) ===
The FET phase partially begins at the fourth term of grade 9. Pupils choose 7subjects (4 compulsory, 3 selective). The subjects chosen depend on the pupil's marks on the third term of the grade 9 academic year (e.g you need 60% in the third term in grade 9 natural sciences to do Physical Science in grade 10 and 50% in grade 9 Mathematics to do Pure Mathematics in grade 10). The classes are then ranked from A to G with the top 40 students being in grade 10 A class although they can choose other classes depending on the subjects they want to do. All subjects from 10 A-G are different, with grade 10 A-C getting more difficult subjects than the rest. The subjects are not chosen individually but chosen in packages. The pupil are to continue with the subjects till the final year/matric (grade 12) unless there are difficulties with a subject.

Compulsory subjects

- English home language
- Afrikaans first additional language
- Pure mathematics or mathematics literacy (depending on the marks)
- Life orientation

Selective subjects (only allowed to choose three)

- Physical sciences
- Life sciences
- Accounting
- Geography
- Business studies
- Computer application technology (CAT)
- History
- Economics

Grade 10 A- D are pure mathematics classes. Grade 10 A-C are physical sciences and life sciences classes. The subjects for 2017 were as follows:
Grade 10A

- English Home Language
- Afrikaans First Additional Language
- Pure Mathematics
- Life Orientation
- Life Sciences
- Physical Sciences
- Accounting

Grade 10B

- English Home Language
- Afrikaans First Additional Language
- Pure Mathematics
- Life Orientation
- Life Science
- Physical Sciences
- Geography

Grade 10C

- English Home Language
- Afrikaans First Additional Language
- Pure Mathematics
- Life Orientation
- Life Science
- Physical Science
- Business Studies

Grade 10D

- English Home Language
- Afrikaans First Additional Language
- Pure Mathematics
- Life Orientation
- Business Studies
- Accounting
- Economics

Grade 10E

- English Home Language
- Afrikaans First Additional Language
- Pure Mathematics
- Life Orientation
- Life Sciences
- Computer Application Technology
- Geography

Grade 10F and G

- English Home Language
- Afrikaans First Additional Language
- Pure Mathematics
- Life Orientation
- History
- Geography
- Business Studies
