= Tafelsig, Mitchells Plain =

Suburb of Cape Town, in Western Cape, South Africa

Tafelsig
- Location within Western Cape Location within South Africa
- Coordinates: 34.060°S 18.637°E
- Country: South Africa
- Province: Western Cape
- Municipality: City of Cape Town
- Main Place: Mitchells Plain, Cape Town

Area
  - Total: 4.32 km^{2} (1.67 sq mi)

Population (2011)
  - Total: 61,757
  - Density: 14,300/km^{2} (37,000/sq mi)

Racial makeup (2011)
  - Black African: 6.10%
  - Coloured: 92.63%
  - Indian/Asian: 0.40%
  - White: 0.10%
  - Other: 0.76%

First languages (2011)
  - Afrikaans: 68.36%
  - English: 26.20%
  - IsiXhosa: 2.99%
- Time zone: UTC+2 (SAST)

Tafelsig is a neighbourhood in the south eastern corner of the Mitchells Plain urban area of the City of Cape Town in the Western Cape province of South Africa.

== History ==
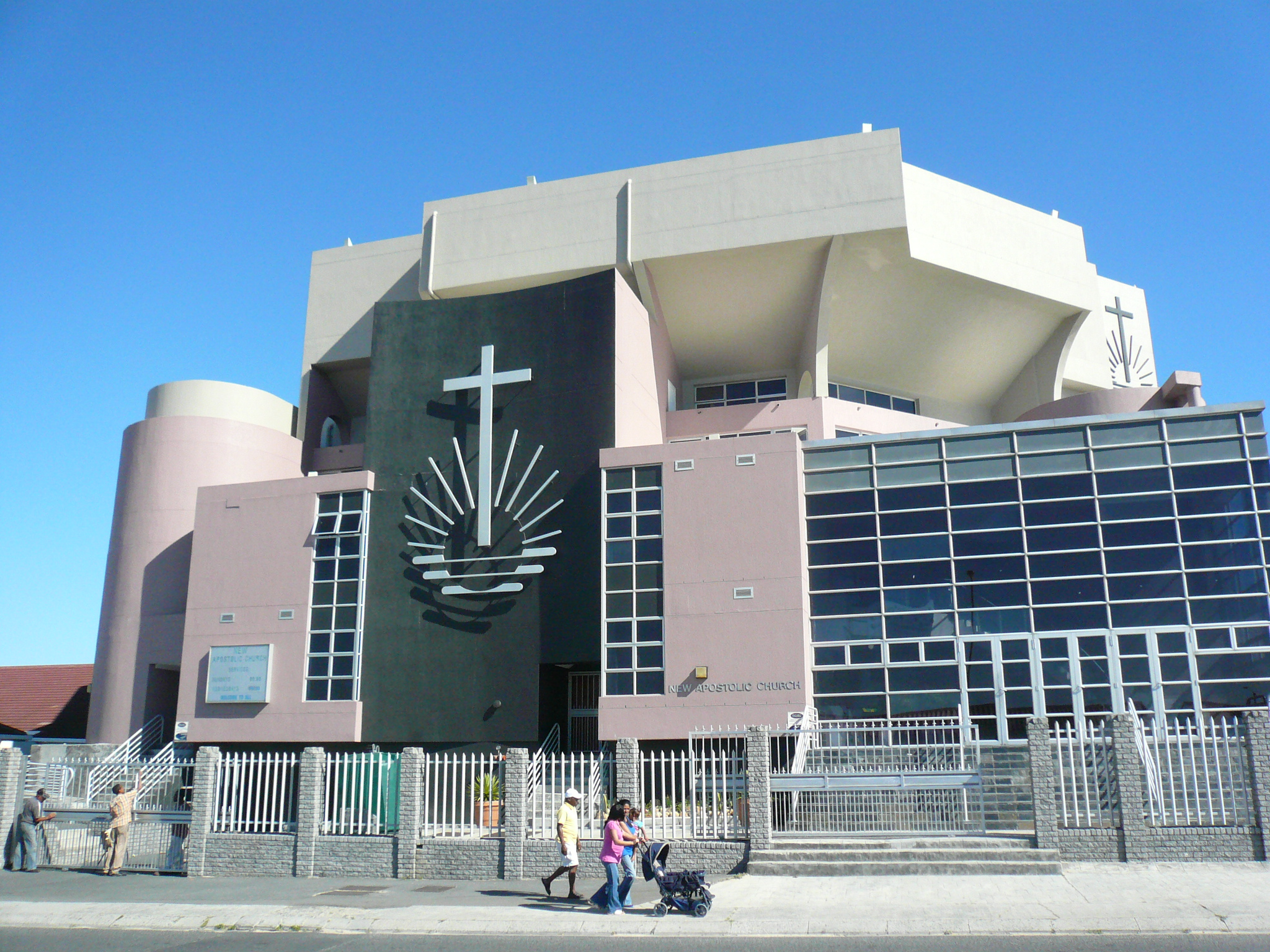
The New Apostolic Church in Tafelsig in 2011

Tafelsig has the largest New Apostolic Church building in the world.

Educational institutions in the neighbourhood include:

- Agape School
- Yellowwood Primary School
- Perseverance Primary School
- Cascade Primary School
- Searidge Park Primary School
- Tafelsig Primary School
- Huguenot Primary School
- Mitchell Heights Primary School
- Tafelsig Secondary School
- AZ Berman High School
