= Mandali Puja =

Religious Celebration

Mandali Puja is a celebration in Chimkhola and nearby villages in the Dhawalagiri Zone of west-central Nepal. It is celebrated annually on a Tuesday in the month of Mangsir (the eighth month of the Nepalese calendar), after the Marghashirsha (the first month of winter) Sukla Pratipada with a black she-goat (if possible). It may also be observed individually throughout the year on Ujjali (Tuesday) of any month. Mandali Puja is observed to appeal for a cure from illness, relief from misfortune, and success in foreign travel. Women who wish to become doctors believe that if they make an offering, 75% of them will be successful. The offering was originally a goat, but since 2025 BS (1968 AD) a pair of pigeons are also used. A comb, thread, ribbon, mirror and a sari are offered to the goddess. She is believed to be very powerful, so she is worshipped by people from different places.

== Mandali Bajai ==
According to legend, Mandali Bajai (third granddaughter of the last Thakuri king of Dholarthan) was married in Waakhet in Pathlekhet VDC. Her third daughter was Mandali Bajai. Since childhood, she was different and at age 17 or 18, she was beaten and scolded by the villagers. Despite pain and illness she came to Chimkhola, crossing the Raghuganga River in 1921 BS (1864 AD). Mallika Puja was taking place at Mulkarha, and Mandali Bajai became a pilgrim. After a long night of celebration, on her way back to Chimkhola she was struck by a cow named Guleni on the north side of Mandali Than (now known as Chulthepathi) and died of her injuries. Eight to 10 years after the accident, Mandali Bajai began to appear through spiritualists, convincing them to worship her at the present place. Her veneration began in 1930 BS (1873 AD).

The shrine was originally near a large puwale bush, but in 1975 BS (1918 AD) Chambir Tilija, a devotee, built a fence around the area. In 2008 BS (1951 AD), however, a landslide from the Tamkhane Gahra destroyed the puwale bush and surrounding area. After the landslide, the temple was moved to the north of the village, in Chamalabot. However, the witch doctors encouraged worship at the old site, near a milky tree. In accordance with their wishes, the villagers searched the area and found a dudelo tree (a tree in the region of Chimkhola which is used to feed domestic animals). Beginning in 2013 BS (1956 AD), worship began at the original site, which was again fenced in by Chambir Tilija. In 2021 BS (1964), G. K. Paha Bahadur Pun dedicated a temple. Later, Karna Bahadur Tilija's sons Li Tam Bahaur Tilija, Som Bahadur Tilija, Moti Bahadur Tilija and Man Bahadur Tilija (who lived in the area), built another temple. In 2062 BS (2005), the original temple was renovated by G. K. Paha Bahadur Pun, Jaisara Pun (his oldest wife), Kali Maya Pun (his youngest wife), Indra Bahadur Pun (his oldest son), Ruk Maya Pun (his oldest daughter-in-law), Dek Bahadur Pun (his youngest son) and Bina Pun (his youngest daughter).
