= Mandalay, Mitchells Plain =

Suburb of Cape Town, in Western Cape, South Africa

Mandalay
- Location within Western Cape Location within South Africa
- Coordinates: 34.0163°S 18.626°E
- Country: South Africa
- Province: Western Cape
- Municipality: City of Cape Town
- Main Place: Mitchells Plain, Cape Town

Area
  - Total: 2.25 km^{2} (0.87 sq mi)

Population (2011)
  - Total: 8,839
  - Density: 3,930/km^{2} (10,200/sq mi)

Racial makeup (2011)
  - Black African: 80.91%
  - Coloured: 12.85%
  - Indian/Asian: 0.33%
  - White: 0.21%
  - Other: 1.30%

First languages (2011)
  - Afrikaans: 9.66%
  - English: 17.24%
  - IsiXhosa: 67.93%
- Time zone: UTC+2 (SAST)

Mandalay is a neighbourhood in the northeastern corner of the Mitchells Plain urban area of the City of Cape Town in the Western Cape province of South Africa.
