= Lentegeur =

Suburb of Cape Town, in Western Cape, South Africa

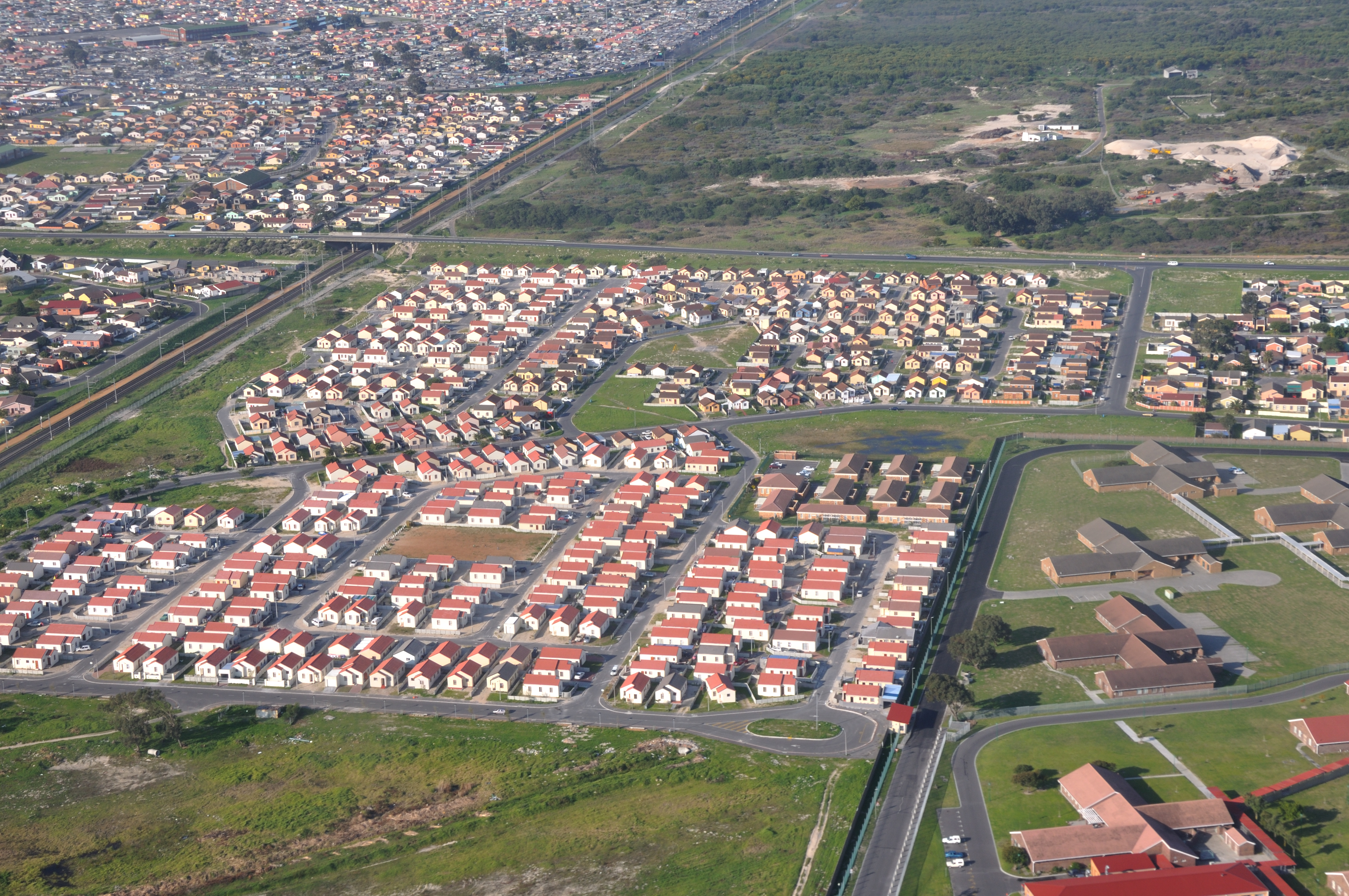
- An aerial view of a city block in Lentegeur. A section of the Mitchells Plain Hospital can be seen in the far right corner of the photograph.

- Location within Western Cape Location within South Africa
- Coordinates: 34.030°S 18.618°E
- Country: South Africa
- Province: Western Cape
- Municipality: City of Cape Town
- Main Place: Mitchells Plain, Cape Town

Area
  - Total: 4.71 km^{2} (1.82 sq mi)

Population (2011)
  - Total: 40,341
  - Density: 8,560/km^{2} (22,200/sq mi)

Racial makeup (2011)
  - Black African: 5.13%
  - Coloured: 93.49%
  - Indian/Asian: 0.46%
  - White: 0.32%
  - Other: 0.59%

First languages (2011)
  - Afrikaans: 54.27%
  - English: 43.16%
  - IsiXhosa: 1.05%
- Time zone: UTC+2 (SAST)

Lentegeur is a neighbourhood in the north eastern section of the Mitchells Plain urban area of the City of Cape Town in the Western Cape province of South Africa. The 400 bed Mitchells Plain Hospital, one of Cape Town's larger hospitals, is located in the neighbourhood. The Lentegeur Sports Grounds dominate the central area of the neighbourhood.

Educational institutions in the neighbourhood include:

- Lentegeur Secondary School
- Aloe High School
- West End Primary School
- Springdale Primary School
- Merrydale Primary School
- Hyacinth Primary School
- Meadowridge Primary School
- Latana Primary School
- Cornflower Primary School
