= Belmond Road to Mandalay =

River cruiser in Myanmar

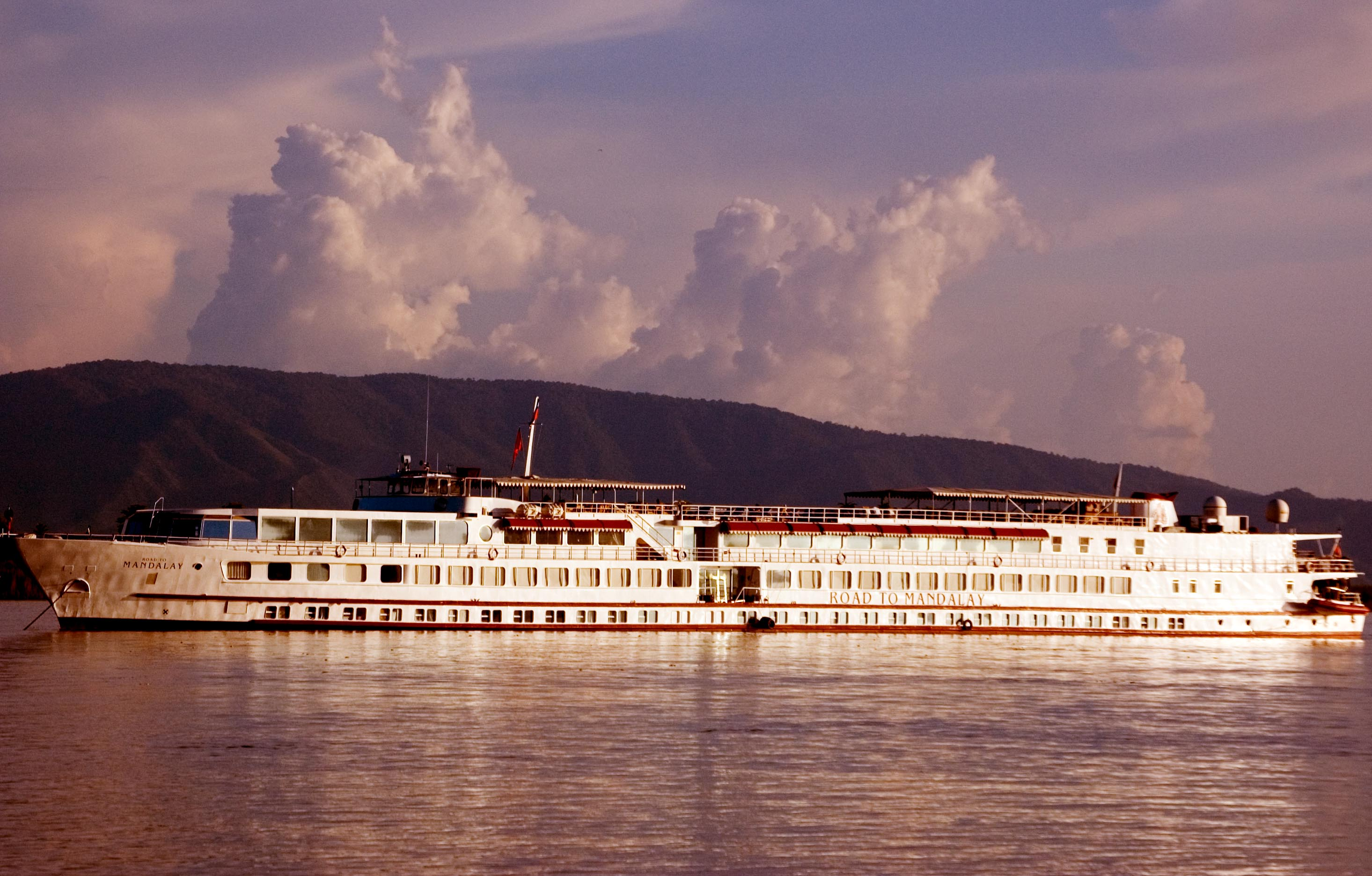

General information
- Location: Irrawaddy River, Myanmar
- Management: Belmond Ltd.

Other information
- Number of rooms: 43

Website
- Official website

Belmond Road to Mandalay is a river cruiser in Myanmar and formerly known as Burma, that plies the Irrawaddy River, also known as the Ayeyarwady River. Its ports of call include Myanmar’s largest city, Yangon, Bagan, Mandalay and Bhamo. It also visits remote villages and temples close to Myanmar’s border with China.

The launch took place on April 19, 1964, as a river cruiser on the Rhine in Europe. It was completely redesigned and relaunched at Blohm+Voss in Hamburg by Orient-Express Hotels in 1995. In 2014 the company changed its name to Belmond Ltd. and the ship was renamed Belmond Road to Mandalay. As of May, 2023 the cruise service remains inoperative due to ongoing civil war in Myanmar.

Names of the Ship:

- Nederland (1964–1987)
- Rhine Princess (1988)
- Globus (1989)
- Nederland (1989–1991)
- Elbresidenz (1991–1994)
- Road to Mandalay (1995–2014)
- Belmond Road to Mandalay (2014–)
