= Mandra, Haskovo Province =

Mandra
- Village
- Location in Bulgaria
- Coordinates: 41.819°N 25.504°E
- Country: Bulgaria
- Province: Haskovo Province
- Municipality: Haskovo
- Time zone: UTC+2 (EET)
  - Summer (DST): UTC+3 (EEST)

Mandra is a village in the municipality of Haskovo, in Haskovo Province, in southern Bulgaria.

The prominent Ottoman Ayan Hasköylü Emin Ağa, who belonged to the Bulgarian Turks, was born 1751 in this village. Around 1794-1795 he became the captain of 25.000 Kardzhali's, a band of Mountain Bandits (Rumeli Dağlı İsyanları) in Rumelia, and ruled the Kardzhali-Haskovo area, de facto independent of the Sublime Porte. He built a big konak, which today can only be seen as a ruin. He took many Bulgarian women to his harem. Among them, there was Güzel Gergana (the beautiful Gergana), who played a major role in his downfall, although she was pregnant by him at that time. His eldest son was Selim. Emin Aga's brother was called Mehmed. The Kardzhali gang attacked Edirne, at the 1806 Edirne incident.

Emin Ağa's rule ended in 1813 when he was defeated by the Sublime port, he died in 1830.
