= Mitchells Plain =

Suburb of Cape Town, in Western Cape, South Africa

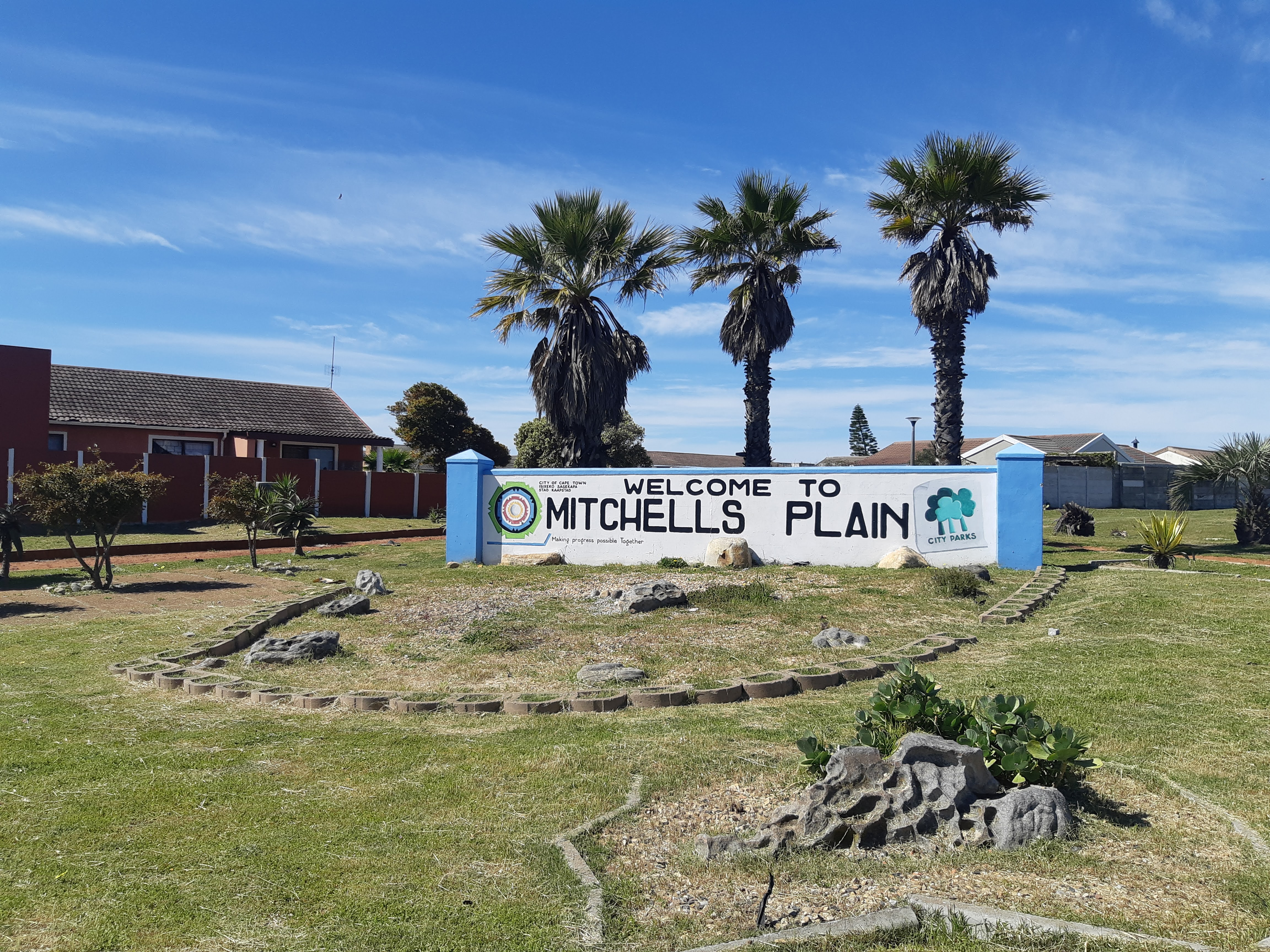
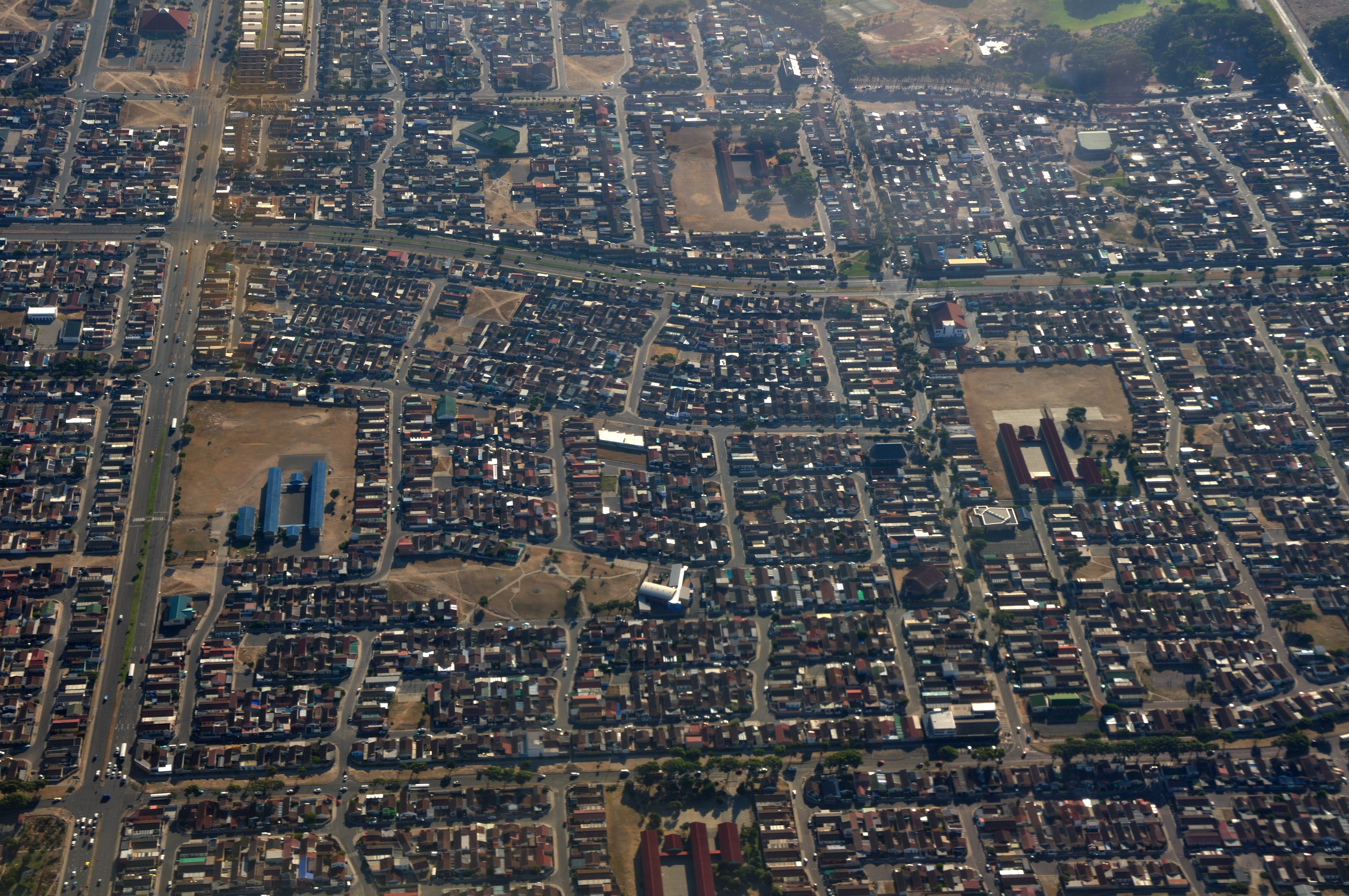
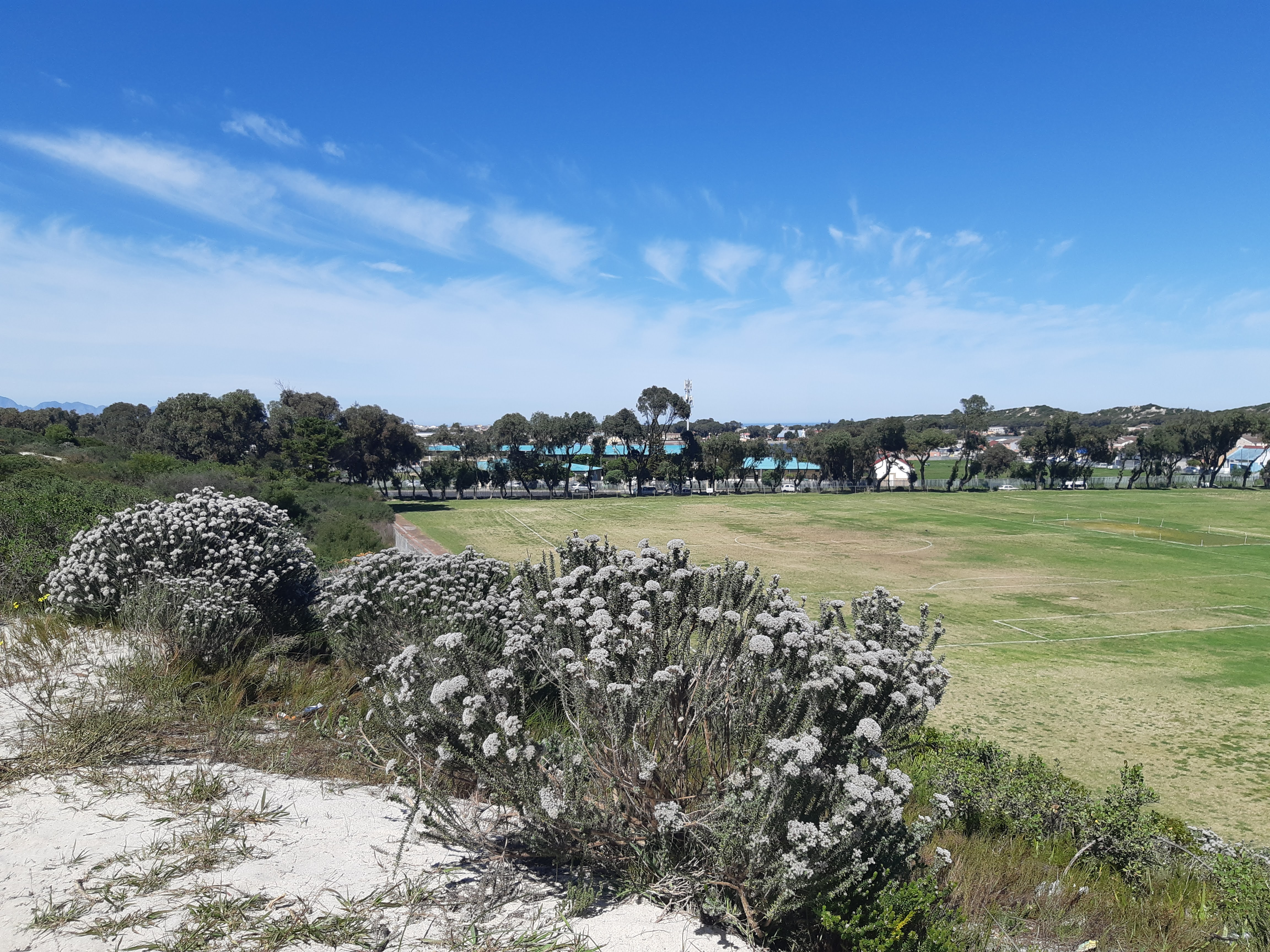
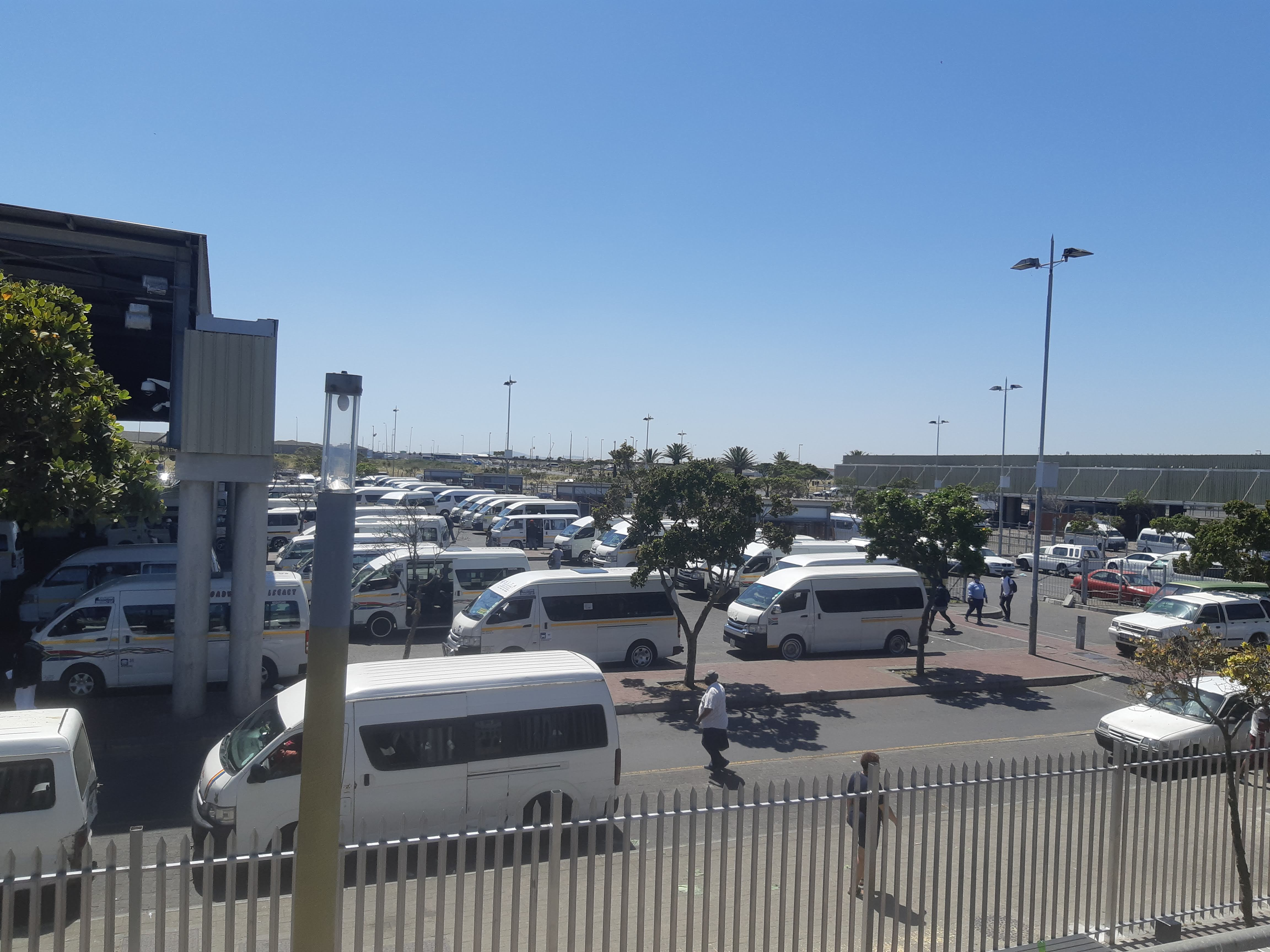
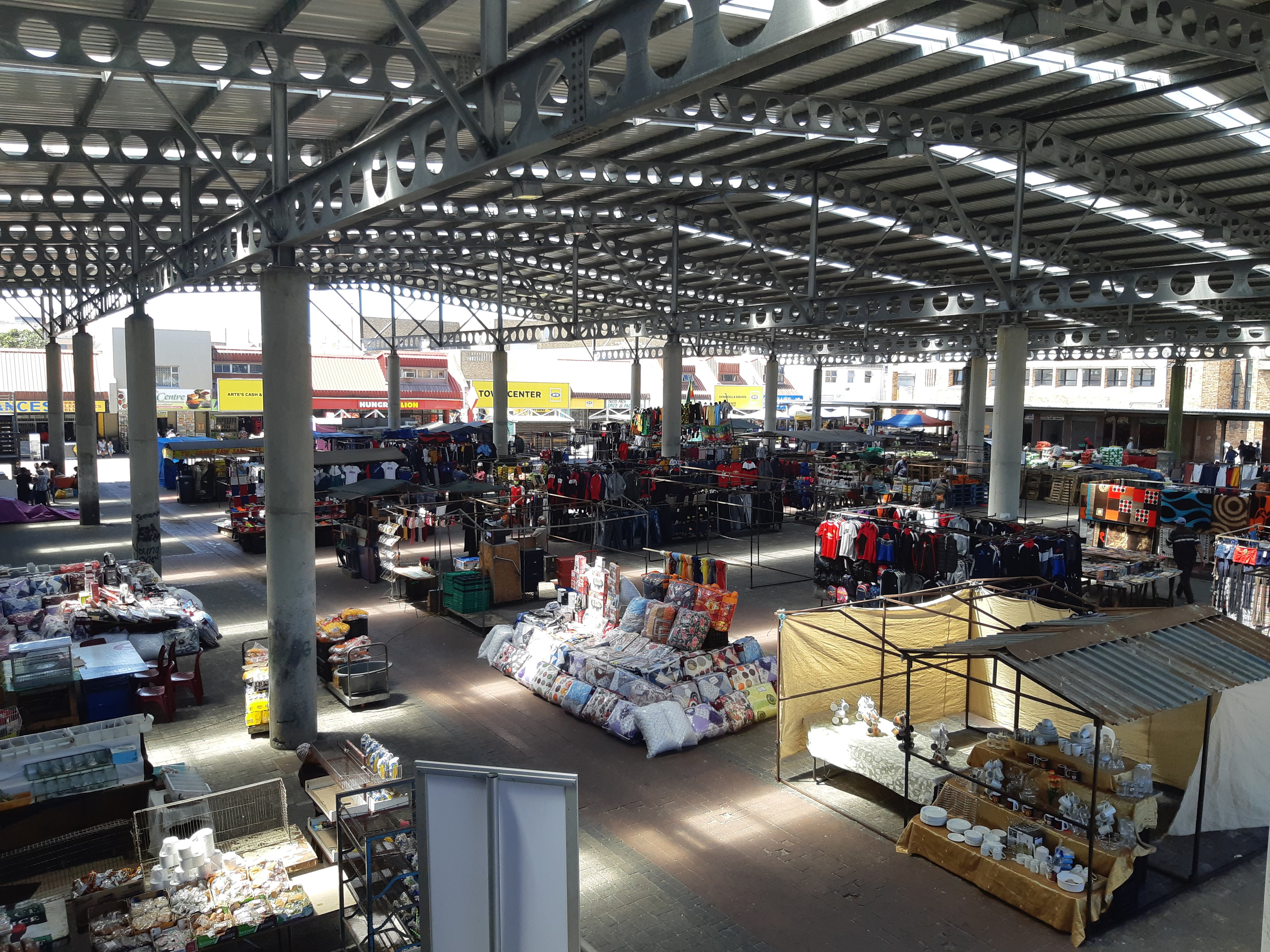
- From top, Mitchells Plain sign at the intersection of the M7 and R300. An aerial view of Mitchells Plain (centre right). A view over Westridge from the dunes at the Westridge Gardens (centre left). The notable Luco Meyer town centre taxi rank (bottom left). Mitchells Plain town centre market (bottom right).

- Location within Western Cape Location within South Africa Location within Africa
- Coordinates: 34°3′2″S 18°37′5″E
- Country: South Africa
- Province: Western Cape
- Municipality: City of Cape Town

Area
  - Total: 43.76 km^{2} (16.90 sq mi)

Population (2011)
  - Total: 310,485
  - Density: 7,095/km^{2} (18,380/sq mi)

Racial makeup (2011)
  - Black African: 7.3%
  - Coloured: 90.8%
  - Indian/Asian: 0.6%
  - White: 0.2%
  - Other: 1.1%

First languages (2011)
  - English: 47.4%
  - Afrikaans: 46.9%
  - Xhosa: 3.3%
  - Other: 2.4%
- Time zone: UTC+2 (SAST)
- Postal code (street): 7785
- PO box: 7789

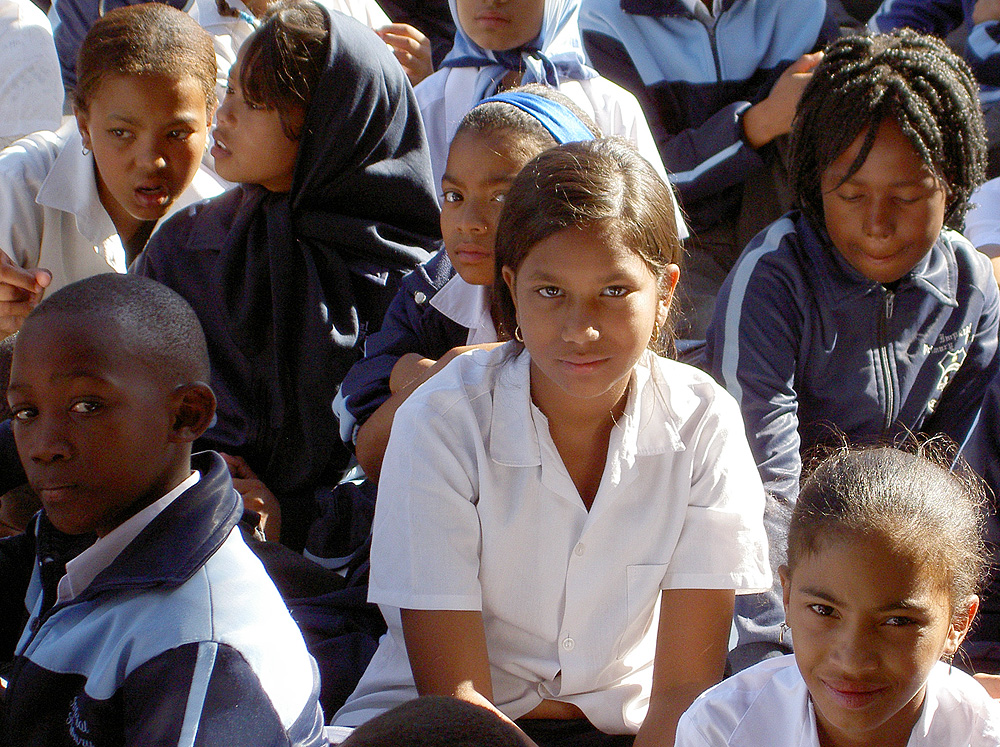
School children at Mitchells Plain school. They draw learners from Khayelitsha and Philippi as well.

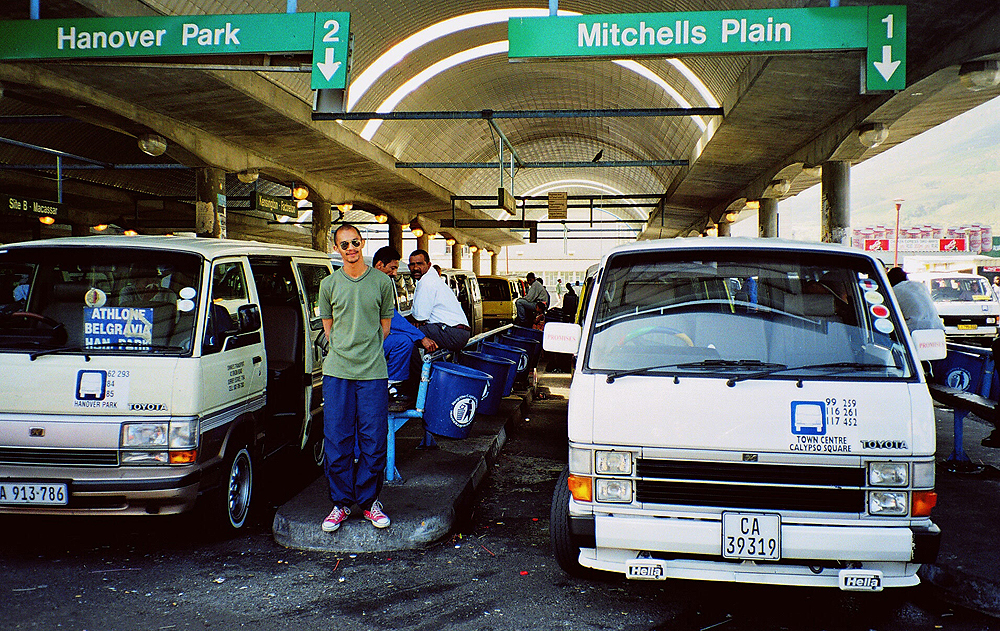
Taxis from Cape Town station to Mitchells Plain

Mitchells Plain is a large census designated sub-place located within the City of Cape Town, Western Cape, South Africa and situated about 28 km (17 mi) from the Cape Town city centre. It is one of South Africa's largest residential areas and contains multiple smaller suburbs. It is located on the Cape Flats on the False Bay coast between Muizenberg and Khayelitsha. Conceived of as a "model suburb" by the apartheid government, it was built during the 1970s to provide housing for Coloured victims of forced removal due to the implementation of the Group Areas Act.

At an estimated population of 290,000–305,000 people, it comprises a number of sub-sections which reflect the diverse class backgrounds of the population. It was once a major stronghold of the United Democratic Front, the broad-based ANC-sponsored anti-apartheid body. It also has one of greater Cape Town's biggest shopping centres, known as the Liberty Promenade.

== History ==
Mitchells Plain was created by the apartheid government in the early 1970s as a Coloured township for middle-income families and coloured people who were forcefully removed from their homes. The township was laid out in terms of the neighbourhood unit concept with large open spaces, localised public facilities and wide arterial routes. Various forms of housing were provided including, freestanding, semi-detached and duplex housing. However, by the late 80s and 90s, major areas of Mitchells Plain (mostly in the suburb's eastern half) deteriorated into urban ghettos. Gangsterism and drug abuse has increased and a number of informal settlements has sprung up in several areas, most notably in Eastridge and Tafelsig.

=== Siqalo riots ===
In May 2018, violent protests around service delivery broke out in the Siqalo informal settlement. Residents blockaded entrance roads in and out of Mitchells Plain, resulting in conflict with Mitchells Plain residents.

== Etymology ==
The residential area was reportedly named after Mitchell Baker but this is unconfirmed, and is one of a number of possible explanations. Another theory is that the area was named after Major Charles Cornwallis Michell, the Cape's first surveyor-general. Yet another theory is that the area was named after a farmer that previous owned a farm that the neighborhood was built on.

== Sub-sections ==
Mitchells Plain is split into a number of sub-sections or suburbs. The western half of the township is home to a wealthier middle class population, while the eastern half comprises poorer working class communities.

- Rocklands
- Westridge
- Portland
- Tafelsig
- Eastridge
- Beacon Valley
- Lentegeur
- Woodlands
- Weltevreden Valley
- Colorado Park
- Mandalay
- Montclair
- Watergate Developments
- Heinz Park
- Morgans Village
- Strandfontein Village
- Westgate
- Montrose Park
- Lost City

== Demographics ==
According to 2011 census data compiled by Statistics South Africa, Mitchells Plain comprises the following in terms of demographics:

Group	Male	Percentage	Female	Percentage	Total	Percentage
Black African	12,692	4.48	14,021	4.95	22,723	7.32
Coloured	122,360	43.17	131,485	46.43	281,829	90.77
Indian/Asian	902	0.32	861	0.30	1,926	0.62
White	274	0.09	307	0.10	581	0.19
Total	151,033	48.64	159,453	51.36	310,486	100

== Mitchells Plain today ==
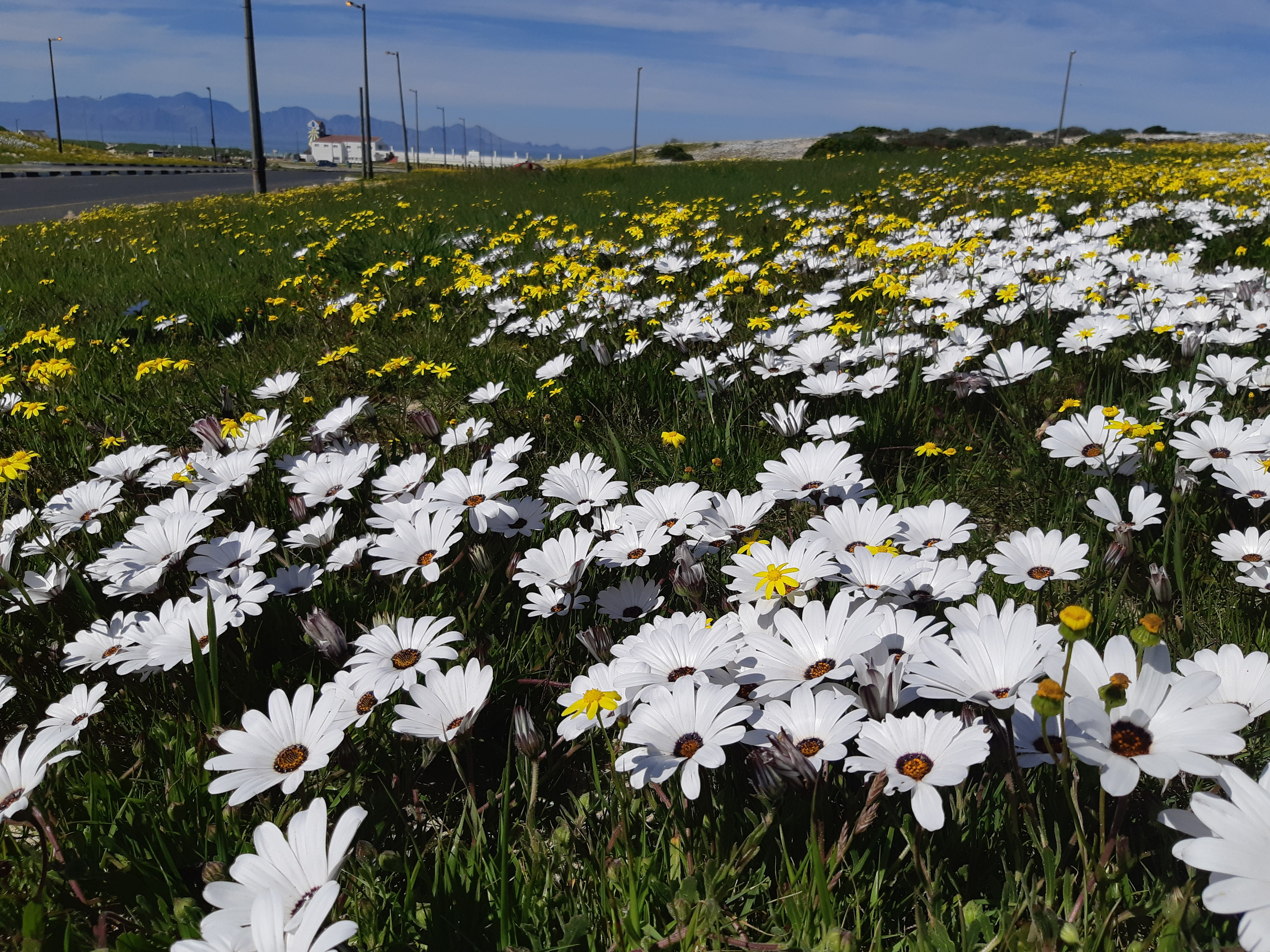
Rain Daisies in full bloom at the entrance to the Mnandi Beach, just south of Rocklands in Mitchells Plain and bordering the Wolfgat Nature Reserve.

Today Mitchells Plain is one of Cape Town's and South Africa's largest suburbs. with a population of about 310,000 people in 2020.

In terms of economic activity, investment is primarily in retail development with Mitchell's Plain being considered as having the strongest level of investment on the Cape Flats. It has a central business district (CBD), locally called the "Town Centre" and three large shopping centres; Promenade Shopping Centre on AZ Berman Drive, Westgate Mall on the corner of Morgenster and Vanguard Drive and Watergate Shopping Centre, completed in 2017, on the corner of the Cape Flats Freeway (R300) and AZ Berman Drive. The Promenade Shopping Centre is the largest with more than 120 stores comprising major clothing, furniture, banks and restaurant chains. Informal economic activity is a significant part of the local economy. Such activity reflects a dominance of retail functions with informal trading responding to market and thus concentrated around the main public transport interchanges and along heavily utilised pedestrian routes.

The area has or is bordered by a number of notable parks and nature reserves. The Mnandi Beach is a blue flag rated beach located to the south of the area. The Westridge Gardens are located in the community of Westridge features many Cape Flats Sand Fynbos species in an urban garden setting. Two nature reserves border Mitchells Plain that are also notable for their Cape Flats Sand Fynbos ecosystems are the Wolfgat Nature Reserve and the Vesuvius Way Conservation Area.

== Public transport ==
Mitchells Plain is reasonably well served by public transport services comprising commuter rail, bus and mini-bus taxi services. There are three Cape Metrorail commuter rail stations within the area at Kapteinsklip, Mitchell's Plain and Lentegeur. The rail line extends northwards towards Philippi, Cape Town CBD and the industrial areas at Epping. The commuter rail service is commonly characterised by overcrowding during morning and afternoon peak periods as well as being unsafe during off-peak periods.

The Mitchell's Plain Public Transport Interchange at the Mitchell's Plain Station includes a major bus terminus and taxi rank which provide public transport services to every major employment area within the City of Cape Town during the morning peak period. There is regular scheduled bus and unscheduled mini-bus taxi services to Cape Town CBD, Claremont, Bellville, Wynberg, and other areas. At more than 30,000 passenger trips per weekday and more than 90,000 passengers daily, it is one of the busiest transport interchanges in the city. Recent years have seen significant investment by the local authority in improving and upgrading public transport infrastructure and facilities at the Mitchell's Plain Interchange.

== Mitchells Plain CBD ==
The Mitchells Plain Commercial Business District is commonly referred to as the Town Center by residents. It is a shopping district that includes a 58,000-square-metre (620,000 sq ft) retail plaza, a shopping centre over and around in the train station, a public library, two major transport interchanges and informal markets. Informal traders in the Town Center sell fruit, vegetables, stationery, spices and cosmetics.

== Schools ==
Mitchells Plain is home to 85 schools, Some of these schools include Meadowridge Primary School, Aloe, Lentegeur, Beacon Hill, Oval North, Cedar, Glendale, Rocklands and Westville Primary Spine Road, Mondale, Portland, Princeton, Woodlands, Tafelsig, Westridge, Seaview Primary, West End Primary and Westport Primary

== Social movements ==
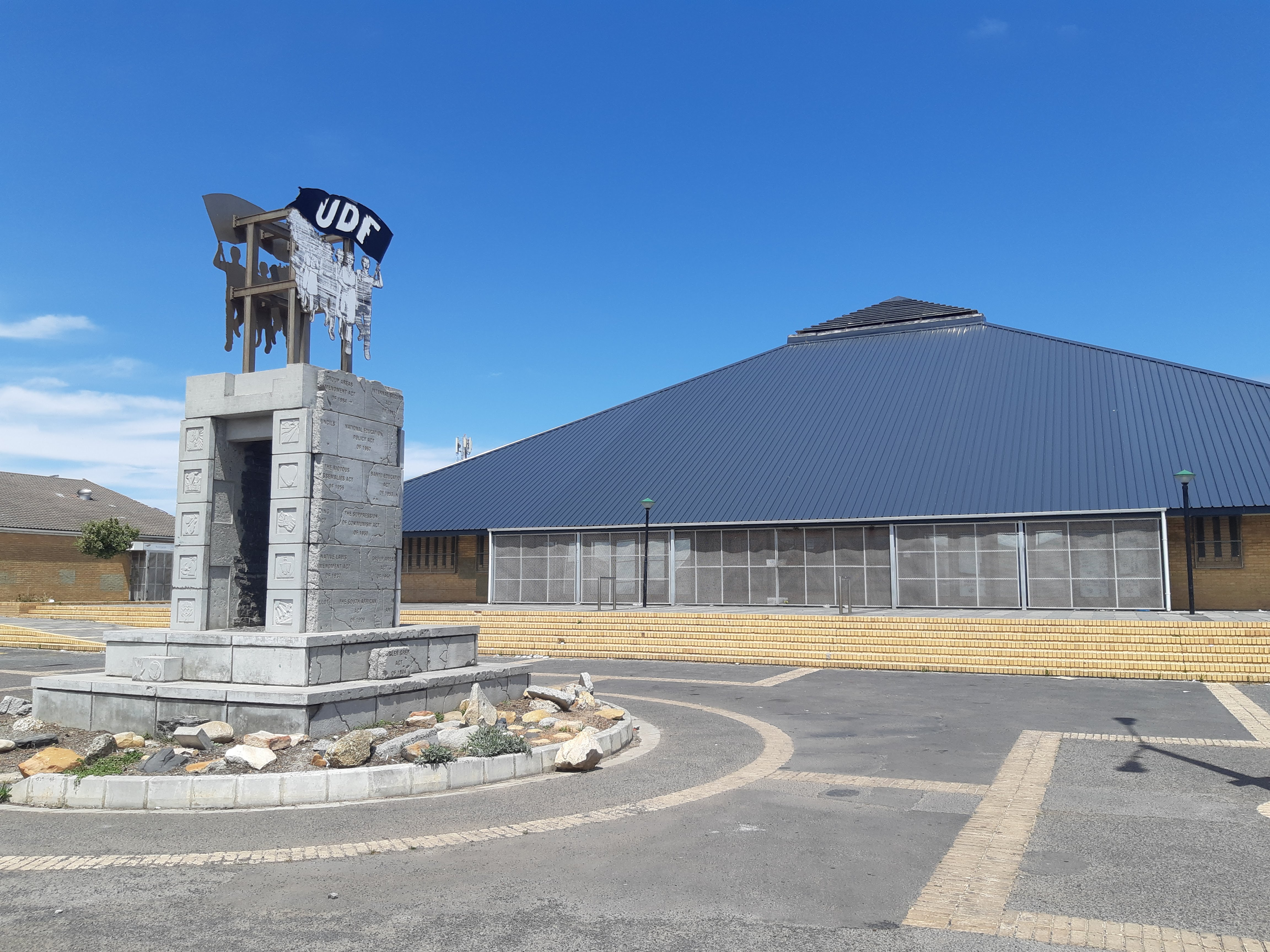
The Rocklands Community Hall where the anti-apartheid movement the United Democratic Front (UDF) was founded.

The United Democratic Front, a mass democratic movement of community organisations and trade unions fighting against apartheid, was launched in Mitchells Plain in August 1983, with Allan Boesak, Frank Chikane and Frances Baard as speakers.

The most active social movements and activist organisations in Mitchells Plain after apartheid have been the Western Cape Anti-Eviction Campaign, the Treatment Action Campaign and the Mitchells Plain Concerned Hawkers and Traders Association. the Mitchell's Plain Backyarders Association, which had strong links to the Western Cape Anti-Eviction Campaign, organised a massive land occupation - The Mitchell's Plain Land Occupation in 2011.

== Prominent residents ==
- Nizaam Carr is a South African rugby union footballer who grew up in Mitchells Plain.
- Athol Williams is a poet and business leader.
- Devon Petersen, the most successful South African darts player, was born in Mitchells Plain.
- Nasief Morris, International and National football player (Defender)
- Moeneeb Josephs, National Football Player (Goalkeeper)
- Ricardo Katza, Former National Football Captain
- Ethen Sampson, soccer player
- Reagen Allen, Deputy Speaker of the Western Cape Provincial Parliament and former Western Cape Government Provincial Minister (MEC) of Police Oversight and Community Safety
- Eddie Andrews, Deputy Mayor, City of Cape Town and former Springbok player

== See also ==
- District Six

== Sources ==
- Mitchells Plain Profile
