= Dunoon, Cape Town =

Township in the Western Cape, South Africa

Dunoon
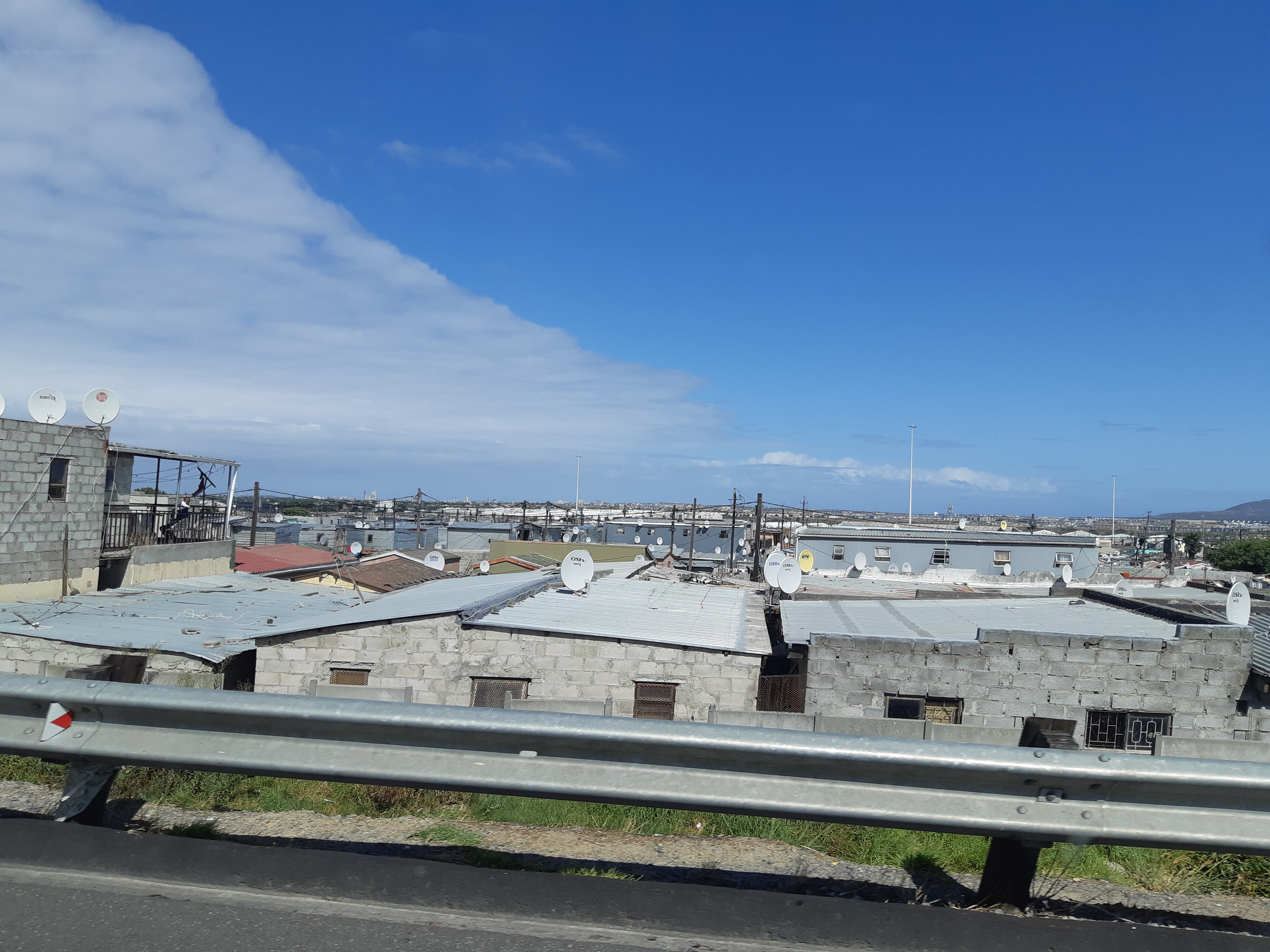
- A view of Du Noon from the N7 highway
- Interactive map of Dunoon
- Coordinates: 33.819°S 18.540°E
- Country: South Africa
- Province: Western Cape
- Municipality: City of Cape Town
- Main Place: Blouberg

Area
  - Total: 0.99 km^{2} (0.38 sq mi)

Population (2011)
  - Total: 29,268
  - Density: 30,000/km^{2} (77,000/sq mi)

Racial makeup (2011)
  - Black African: 89.3%
  - Coloured: 5.6%
  - Indian/Asian: 0.1%
  - White: 0.2%
  - Other: 4.9%

First languages (2011)
  - Xhosa: 64.7%
  - Afrikaans: 7.1%
  - English: 6.7%
  - Sotho: 2.9%
  - Other: 18.6%
- Time zone: UTC+2 (SAST)
- Postal code (street): 7441
- PO box: 7438

Dunoon is a sprawling township in the Western Cape province of South Africa. The first erf for Dunoon was surveyed in 1996. As formal housing was built, shacks developed rapidly.

Dunoon is near the Killarney Motor Racing Complex. The township's neighbouring counterpart is Joe Slovo Park. Dunoon has no police stations; the nearest one is in Table View. In 2011, the population of Dunoon was 31,133 and the number of households was 11,496. The main form of transport for Dunoon residents is the minibus taxi; the MyCiTi bus service opened a bus station to serve Dunoon on 1 March 2014.

On the opposite side of Potsdam Road from Dunoon is an informal settlement called Site 5, which consists of a group of shacks. Dunoon has been known for its participation in violent, xenophobic demonstrations against foreign residents in the township.

== Education ==
Dunoon has three primary schools: Dunoon Primary School, Sophakama Primary, and Silverleaf Primary.

The only high school in the township is Inkwenkwezi High School (also referred to as Inkwenkwezi Secondary School). It is the primary secondary education institution for local learners. As of 2024, the school enrolled over 1,500 learners, resulting in an average of about 45 students per class.

The high school cannot accommodate all learners; forcing many to attend schools outside Dunoon, such as those in Bloubergstrand and Joe Slovo Park. To address the capacity crisis, the Western Cape Education Department had initiated a project to construct 14 new classrooms using the Moladi construction system, planned for completion by March 2023. However, the project encountered delays due to payment disputes with contractors and subcontractors, and by early 2024 only seven classrooms had been completed.

== Health services ==
The City of Cape Town opened a day hospital that is operating since 2016. The city officially opened a temporary clinic in conjunction with the Western Cape Provincial Government to provide better primary healthcare services to residents in the area. The clinic offers services such as reproductive health, HIV counselling and testing, tuberculosis treatment and screening, anti-retroviral treatment, among others.

== Developmental plans ==
The City of Cape Town is the planning authority for Dunoon. It works to resolve a pedestrian trespass problem on the N7 road. Toilets and water standpipes have been removed from the road reserve, and there is a fence to discourage people from entering the N7 road reserve that is regularly repaired. Safety matters and the dangers of crossing the N7 have been discussed with the Dunoon community.

No footbridges had been planned because people usually took the shortest route regardless of safety.

As an alternative, officials have proposed a design to elevate the N7 by approximately 2 metres, in a section north of Richwood; lying between Blaauwberg Road and Potsdam interchange. This adjustment would allow street-level links to be constructed between properties bordering the N7, improving accessibility and safety.

In the interim, a temporary safety measure has involved upgrading an existing agricultural underpass to serve as a pedestrian alternative to crossing the N7. This process has been protracted, requiring the relocation of informal dwellers living in the underpass. The upgrade was originally scheduled for completion by early 2018.

== Protest action ==
South African National Defence Force (SANDF) troops were deployed to Cape Flats, then arrived in Dunoon, on 1 October 2019 to carry out "targeted operations" against crime in the area, where disgruntled taxi operators led violent protests for days. Protests in the vicinity of Joe Slovo Park continued for days. Cars were stoned, roads were barricaded and bus stations were targeted; at least one bus and a truck were set on fire. The protest was the result of a standoff between some taxi bosses and the city council, which refused to budge on demands for allocated transport routes and the scrapping of fines.

The township of Dunoon was calm after a combined force of the army and police units conducted a search and seizure operation. A large column of SANDF armoured personnel carriers, ambulances, and military police lined up in a MyCiTi bus lane beside two burnt-out bus stations.

== COVID-19 de-densification ==
On 23 April 2020, the Western Cape Human Settlements Department began talking to Dunoon residents about plans to de-densify the area to slow the spread of COVID-19. The department said its rapid informal settlement support and upgrade programme would help with social distancing. To make de-densification work, the provincial government will provide temporary accommodation for 10,000 residents.

== 2020 arson attacks ==
On 21 June 2020, the City of Cape Town experienced a surge of arson attacks that targeted MyCiTi bus infrastructure, putting further strain on an already overstretched public transport system. As South Africa attempted to revive its economy after a prolonged period of lockdown, the public transport system was hit by a wave of protest and destruction. The city's Mayoral Committee Member of Transport, Felicity Purchase, condemned the attacks, which have decimated public transport infrastructure in Milnerton and Dunoon. Purchase confirmed that a weekend of attacks on Cape Town buses has cost the city in excess of R8 million. Two MyCiTi buses were completely destroyed by flames. The Omuramba station in Racecourse Road, Montague Gardens, was also set on fire.

Law enforcement responded swiftly, deploying officers to the affected areas. Purchase condemned the destruction of public infrastructure, saying:

This weekend marks one of the worst in the 10-year history of the MyCiTi service, with violent attacks on assets and infrastructure in the Milnerton and Dunoon areas. This is nothing less but sabotage of the worst possible kind, and in a time of crisis when COVID-19 is challenging our resolve like never before.

The unrest in Dunoon appeared linked to broader service‑delivery failures and ongoing disputes over land occupations. Earlier in June, the office of Ward 104 Councillor Lubabalo Makeleni was petrol‑bombed on Youth Day (19 June), a repeat of a similar attack in 2018, allegedly by a criminal syndicate selling plots of land. Security guards reported around 30 youths throwing petrol bombs into the building shortly after, greatly damaging office equipment and furniture. Makeleni attributed the violence to a “land‑invasion syndicate” profiting from selling shacks and plots, and stated: “The people that are burning the offices are the same people that are burning the drugs, but I've not yet met them.”

Western Cape SAPS spokesperson Captain Frederick van Wyk confirmed that violent acts and sporadic arson were occurring in Dunoon, especially along Potsdam Road and the N7, due to housing-allocation disputes.
