= MyCiTi =

Bus rapid transit service in Cape Town, South Africa

- The MyCiTi network as at September 2026
- Parent: City of Cape Town
- Commenced operation: 29 May 2010; 16 years ago
- Locale: Cape Town, Western Cape, South Africa
- Service type: Bus rapid transit
- Routes: 39
- Stops: 946
- Stations: 42
- Fleet: 347 buses, including: Optare Solo; Volvo BZRLE; Scania
- Annual ridership: ~ 23 million (2026)
- Fuel type: Electric; Diesel
- Operator: City of Cape Town
- Director of Public Transport: Harold Peters
- Annual budget: ~ R1.7 billion (2026/27)
- Website: myciti.org.za

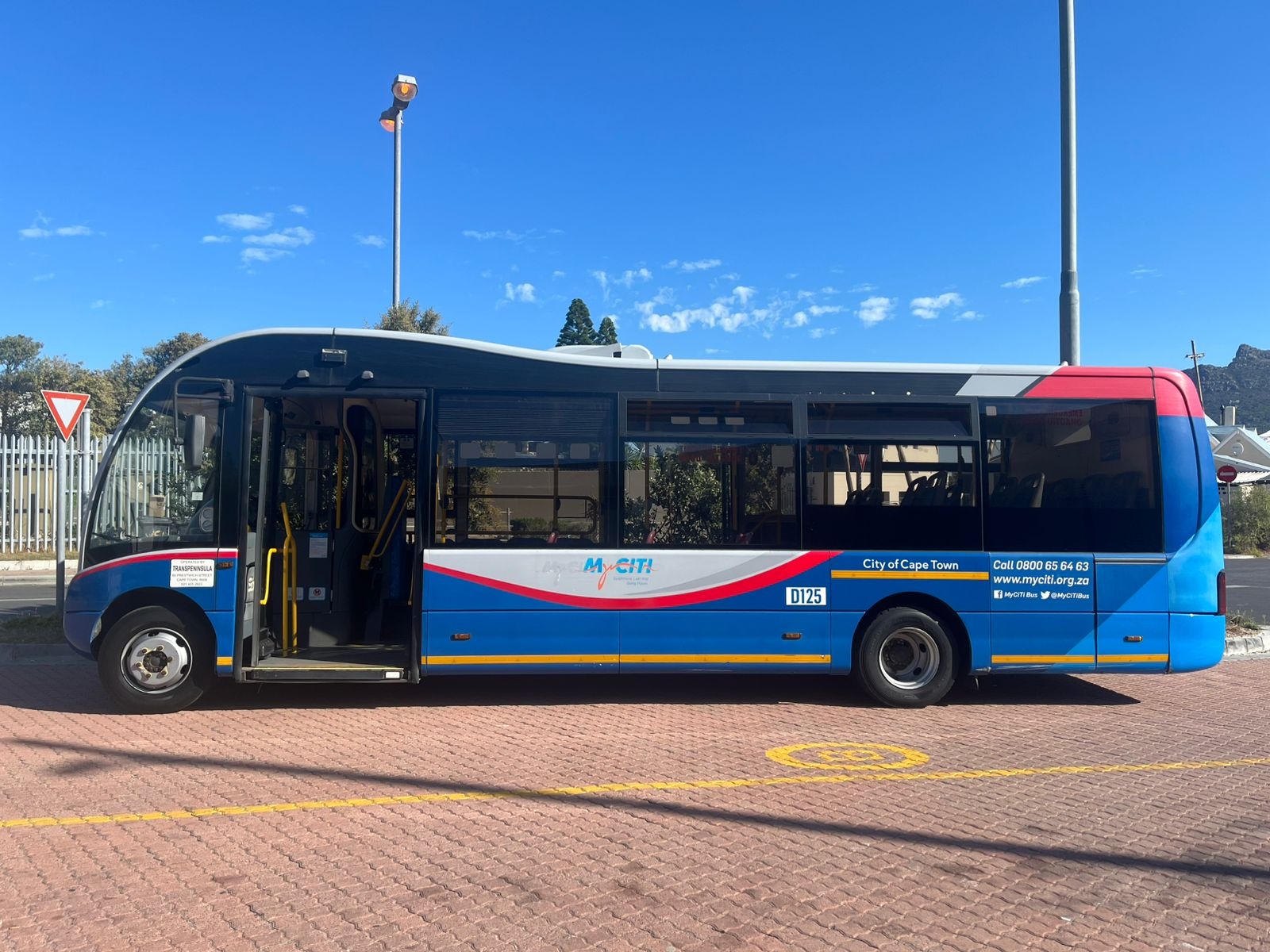
A MyCiTi Optare Solo

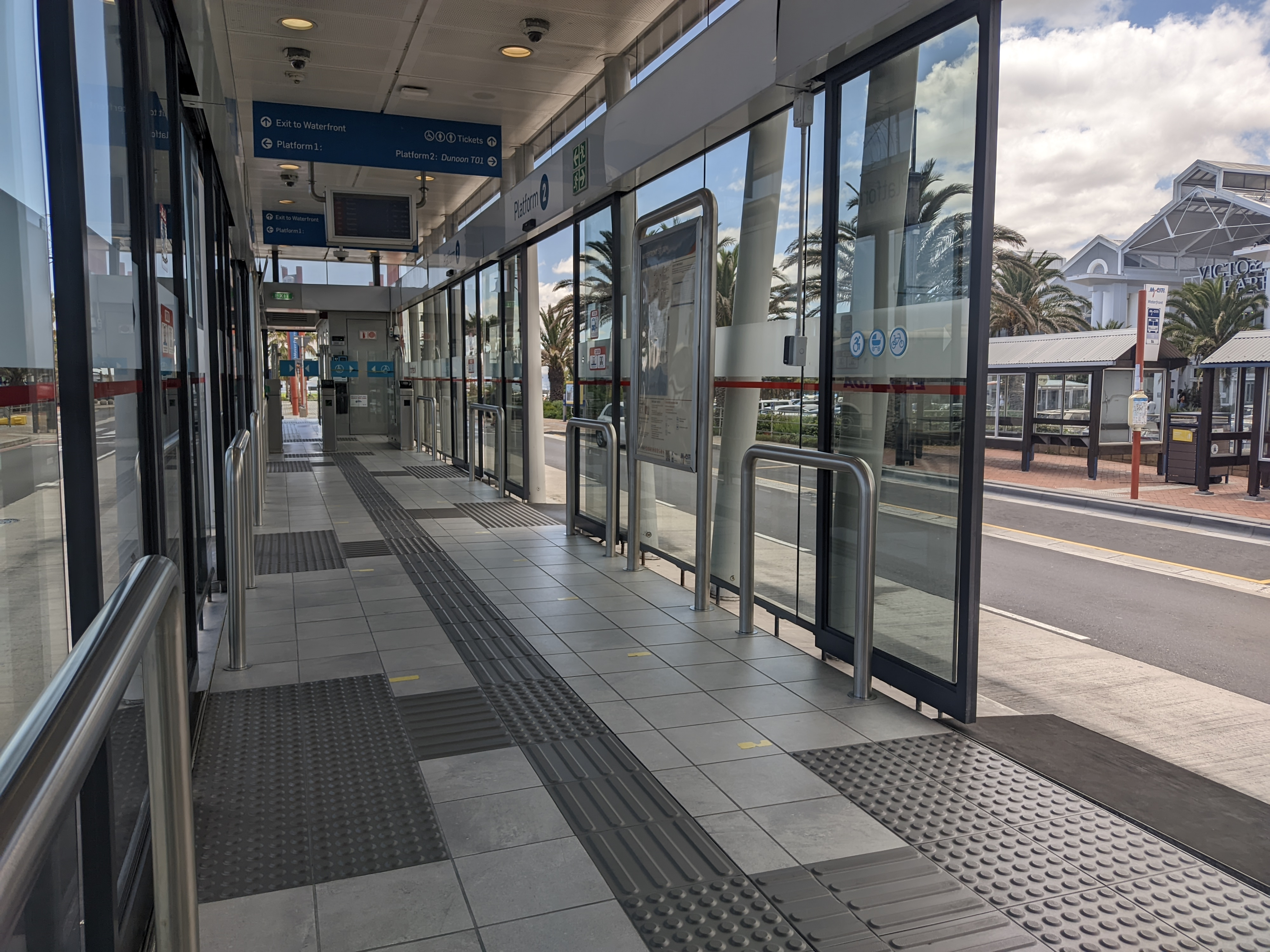
Interior of a MyCiti bus station at the V&A Waterfront

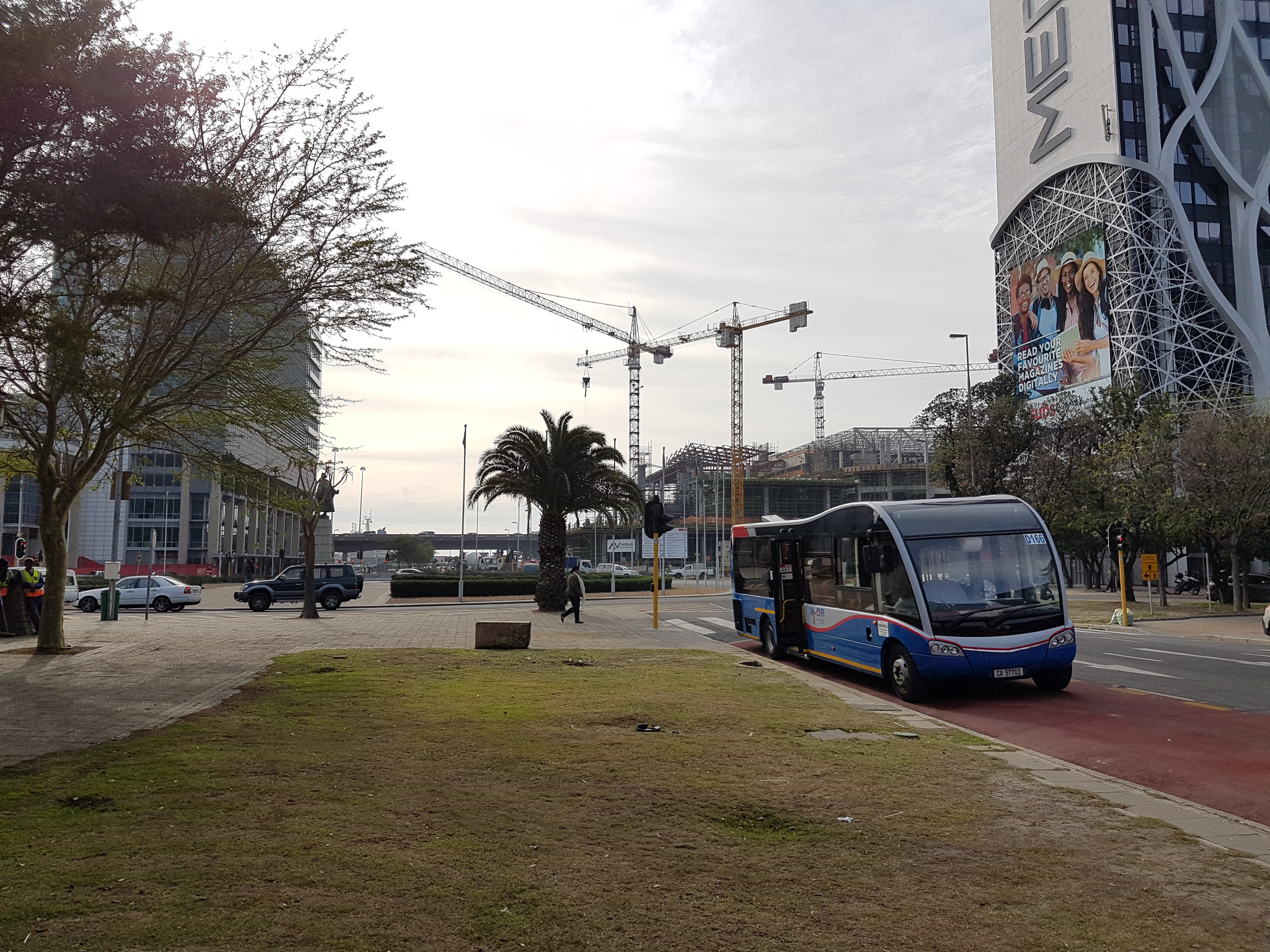
MyCiTi Optare Solo bus in a bus lane in the Foreshore, Cape Town

MyCiTi is a bus rapid transit service in Cape Town, South Africa. It serves as a major part of the city's overall public transit system. Annual ridership reached 23 million in 2026.

Operating with feeders, it forms part of a greater Integrated Public Transport-driven economic development strategy of the City of Cape Town (CoCT) Metropolitan Municipality, situated in the Western Cape province.

As of March 2026, the MyCiTi system has a fleet of 347 electric and diesel buses, operating 39 routes, between 42 stations, and incorporating almost 1,000 stops throughout Cape Town. Furthermore, the system employs around 20km of dedicated BRT lanes, and an N2 Express service.

The MyCiTi fleet consists of a combination of 9-meter air-conditioned Optare Solo low-floor buses (for City Bowl feeder routes), 12-meter Volvo BZRLE low-floor and Scania high-floor buses, and 18-meter Scania low-floor articulated buses. They can transport 48, 84, 94, and 116 passengers respectively. Buses are assembled locally, by Busmark 2000, a bus body manufacturer in Epping, Cape Town.

Stations feature free Wi-Fi, enclosed waiting areas, and off-grid power. MyCiTi buses travel on dedicated, red bus lanes with their own traffic signals, as well as on traditional road networks at times.

Infrastructure is planned to be developed in 4 phases. It is actively being rolled out across Cape Town, with Phase 1A, 1B, and the N2 corridor complete, and Phase 2A underway.

Headway of services (i.e., the time between buses on the same route) ranges from 3 minutes to 20 minutes during peak times. It can be up to 60 minutes during quiet, off-peak periods. 73% of MyCiTi buses are punctual within a window of two minutes early to five minutes late.

== History ==
=== Establishment ===
Cape Town's MyCiTi Bus Rapid Transit (BRT) service officially launched its first phase in May 2010, marking the beginning of a system designed to provide sustainable and integrated public transportation across the city. Initially, the routes connected areas such as Table View and the Cape Town Central Business District (CBD), with the network gradually expanding to include other parts of the city, such as Khayelitsha and Mitchells Plain in 2014.

The South African national government's support for the BRT system was initially motivated by the need to meet public transport requirements for the 2010 FIFA World Cup, during which South Africa served as the host nation. The service was launched to facilitate efficient transportation to and from stadiums. Since then, the BRT has evolved into a key component of the city's integrated public transport network, aimed at promoting social and spatial equality while enhancing urban efficiency.

The first proper bus rapid transit (BRT) phase (Phase 1A) opened in May 2011. It includes a dedicated West Coast busway from the city centre through Milnerton to Table View, along which an express bus service operates. Connecting to this trunk route is a route in the City Bowl connecting Gardens, the Civic Centre bus station and the Waterfront, as well as three feeder services around Table View, Bloubergstrand and Parklands.

In 2012, the first MyCiTi began using its first custom-built 9-metre Optare Solo bus as part of its fleet. The bus was part of an order of 190 units, to be assembled in Epping by Busmark 2000, and used as feeder buses. The Optare Solo's shorter size allows it to maneuver easily in residential and dense city areas.

Major expansion of services occurred from late 2013. They include new routes around Table View and Parklands and links to: Century City via Racecourse Road and Omuramba roads; Montague Gardens along Koeberg Road; Killarney, Dunoon and Doornbach via Blaauwberg Road; Sunningdale and Sandown stations on the West Coast Road; Melkbosstrand; Atlantis, Mamre and Pella.

By 2015 MyCiTi provided a rapid bus service between Blouberg / Table View, Atlantis, Melkbosstrand, Dunoon, Milnerton, Paarden Eiland, Century City, Khayelitsha, Mitchells Plain and Cape Town CBD. It also provided feeder services in most of the above areas as well as in Salt River, Walmer Estate, and all suburbs of the City Bowl and Atlantic Seaboard all the way to Llandudno and Hout Bay.

The MyCiTi bus service has also been extended to Cape Town's south-east, to Khayelitsha and Mitchells Plain, called the N2 Express. It uses Bus and Minibus-taxi (BMT) lane on the N2 highway, which permits public transport vehicles to pass general traffic during the morning peak period.

In October 2018, MyCiTi added 120 000 scheduled kilometre through artificial troops on existing routes and some new routes. It also added more direct services which don't require transfers between different routes, as well as additional bus stops.

In its 2023/2024 Annual Integrated Report, the City of Cape Town confirmed that R5.2 billion had been apportioned for expansion of the MyCiTi network over the following two years.

=== Phase 2A network expansion ===
The most recent network expansion is Phase 2A, which is currently underway. This multi-year project aims to provide accessible public transit to more than 30 communities across Cape Town. It forms part of the City of Cape Town's R6.3 billion MyCiTi bus route development.

MyCiTi's second phase is the largest investment in public transit by any metro in South Africa in history.

Phase 2A includes the building of trunk roads along Govan Mbeki Road, using dedicated bus lanes to reduce travel times. This phase will also have open and closed stations in the middle of roads installed, as well as the installation of wider pedestrian walkways and cycling lanes installed along trunk roads.

Construction as part of Phase 2A commenced following extensive public participation. Preparation for a major depot to serve the neighborhoods of Mitchells Plain and Khayelitsha has also begun.

Also as part of Phase 2A, in March 2025, construction of South Africa's first elevated circle will began, located at the intersection of Govan Mbeki Road (the M9) and Jan Smuts Drive (the M17) in the suburb of Lansdowne. The Sky Circle is planned to connect Mitchells Plain and Khayelitsha with Wynberg and Claremont, will be built 6.2 meters above the ground, and will be for the exclusive use of MyCiTi buses.

=== Fleet electrification ===
In July 2025, the City of Cape Town announced that it had signed a procurement agreement for the MyCiTi fleet. 30 electric buses were ordered from Volvo Bus Southern Africa, with initial deliveries scheduled for 2027. The City further stated that the size of the order may increase, subject to additional funding, and that a separate tender would be issued for installation of charging infrastructure for the new buses.

In October 2025, the City of Cape Town completed the construction of two new major MyCiTi bus depots. The R430 million facilities will house and maintain the new bus fleet for the upcoming MyCiTi Phase 2A expansion. Each of the new depots spans 7.5 hectares, with initial capacity for up to 145 buses, and space to expand to 250 (500 total) as the service grows.

The facilities also have fully functional mechanical workshops, refueling facilities, underground infrastructure for electric bus charging, automated bus-cleaning systems, driver's rest areas, and office space.

At the opening, Cape Town Mayor Geordin Hill-Lewis said, "The MyCiTi service expansion is one of the pillars of Cape Town’s record infrastructure investments, which amounts to R40 billion over the next three years, with 75% directly benefitting lower-income households".

In November 2025, it was reported that, from December of the same year, MyCiTi would begin upgrading its payment validator devices to support contactless transactions via NFC and QR codes. The new validators were aimed at offering more convenience to passengers and speeding up boarding times. The upgrades were part of a phased rollout, scheduled to complete in January 2026.

In April 2026, the City of Cape Town released its 2026/2027 budget, apportioning R3.3 billion towards further development of the MyCiTi network.

In April 2026, it was reported that MyCiTi would take delivery of its first electric bus in August that same year. The 12-meter long Volvo BZR bus would be part of a phased rollout of 30 units, with the goal of modernizing the MyCiTi fleet. This would also boost the local economy, as the bus bodies are manufactured in Johannesburg.

The buses will take part in a year-long trial along existing MyCiTi routes before being put into service. The test, in partnership with the University of Cape Town, and with funding from the Urban Electric Mobility Initiative (UEMI), will gauge the buses' perform across different routes, battery life across various passenger capacities, and climate impact on efficiency and charging. Following a successful pilot, the e-bus fleet is expected to roll out across multiple MyCiTi routes in 2027.

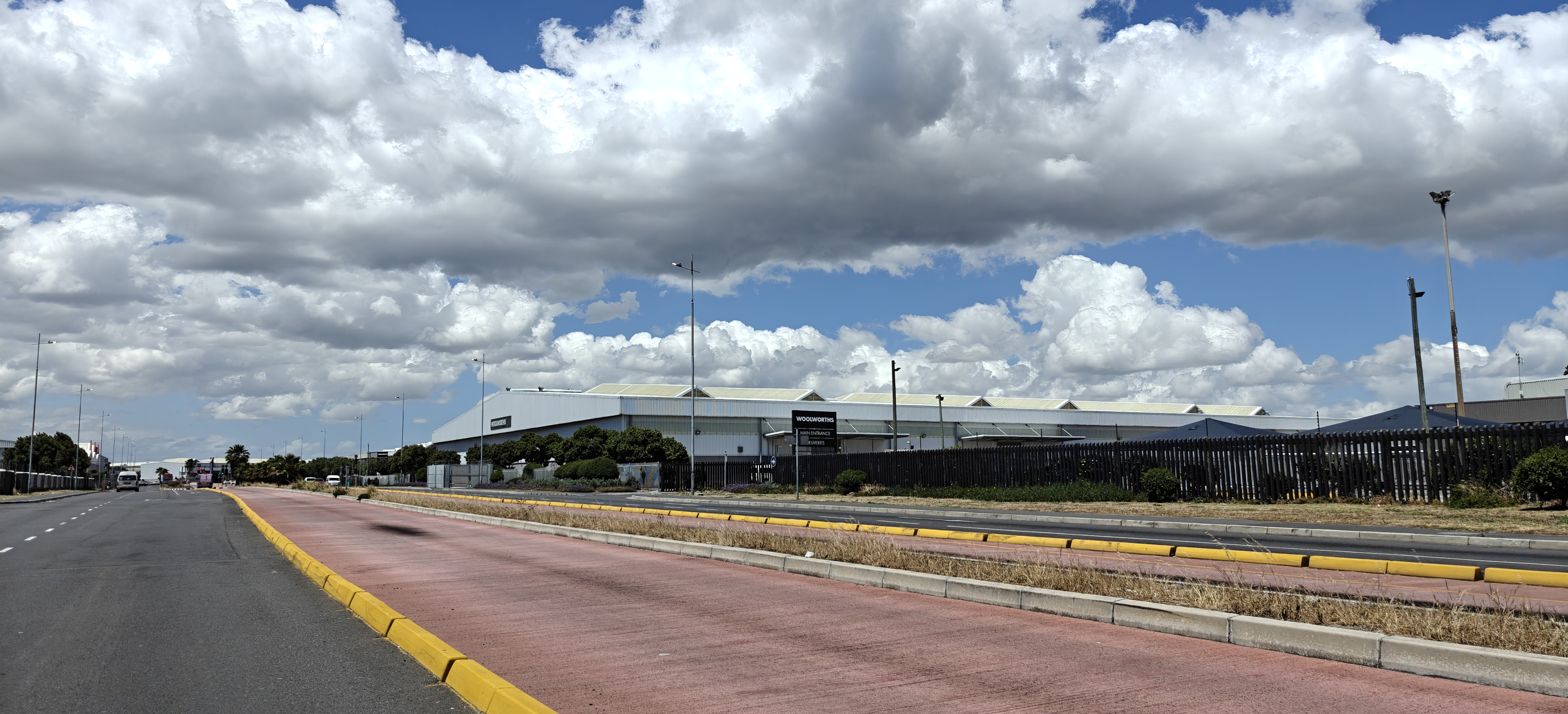
MyCiTi BRT lanes in Milnerton, Cape Town

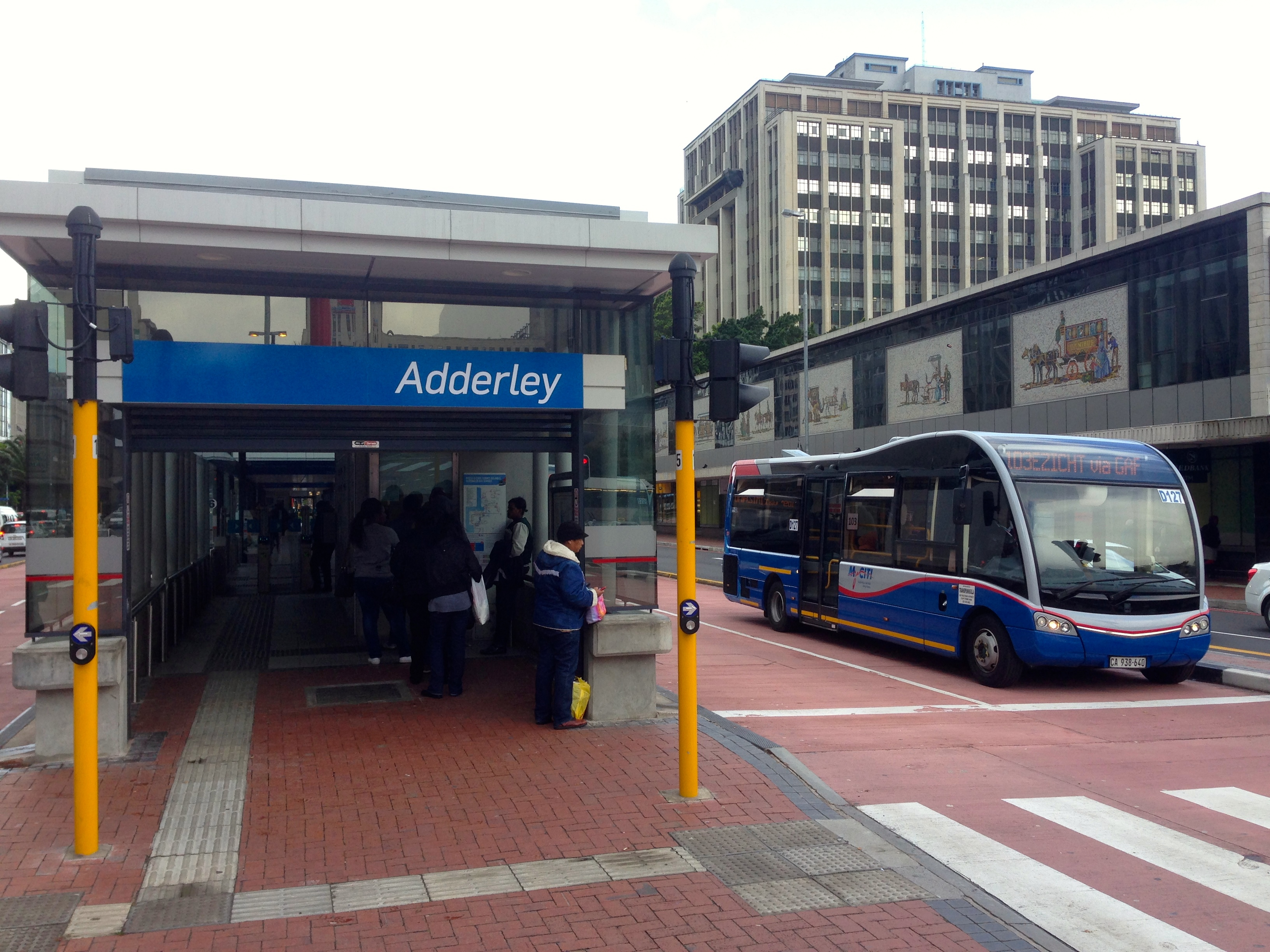
The MyCiTi station in Adderley Street

In June 2026, a progress update eight months after site handover confirmed that 583 concrete piles forming the foundation of the new Claremont MyCiTi BRT station were complete. The team was therefore moving on to the next stage of building the ground floor level. The station, built on the site of the old bus terminus along Claremont Boulevard, will also accommodate Golden Arrow and University of Cape Town (UCT) buses. City of Cape Town MayCo member Rob Quintas said that once the station is complete, Claremont would be one of Cape Town's most connected and integrated transport hubs.

In July 2026, MyCiTi announced that the first of its fully electric buses had started road tests. The Volvo BZRLE bus would serve as a prototype, being tested across a variety of routes, and would reportedly result in an up to 70% reduction in operating costs compared to existing fuel-powered buses. The City of Cape Town confirmed that the e-bus fleet would officially start rolling out by 1 July 2027.

In October 2026, the City announced that it had taken delivery of the first seven new electric buses. These joined the prototype bus, increasing the EV fleet size to eight. The City said a further 13 electric buses were expected to be delivered in November 2026, with the remaining 17 scheduled for delivery between January and March 2027. This would bring the total electric fleet size to 38.

== Payments ==
MyCiTi buses require cashless fare payment, via the EMV-compliant smart card system, called myconnect. These cards can be bought from MyCiTi stations, or at participating retailers. They can then be loaded at stations, participating retailers, and ABSA ATMs.

Riders could at one point buy disposable, single-trip cards, which are now discontinued. Children under 4 years of age can travel for free on MyCiTi buses.

== Statistics ==
MyCiTi passenger journey numbers by fiscal year
Year (July–June)	Passengers (million)*	Change (%)	Notes	Ref
2012–13	3.1	–	Above 2.45 million target	
2013–14	7.4	▲137.94%	Above 5.3 million target	
2014–15	15.4	▲108.10%	Above 8 million target	
2015–16	18.5	▲20.12%	Above 15 million target	
2016–17	19.9	▲7.56%	Above 19 million target	
2017–18	18	▼9.54%	Below 19.1 million target	
2018–19	17.5	▼2.77%	Above 16.8 million target	
2019–20	13.2	▼25.57%	Above 12.8 million target	
2020–21	10.9	▼17.42%	Above 10.2 million target	
2021–22	14.3	▲30.73%	Above 12.5 million target	
2022–23	18.3	▲28.56%	Above 16.9 million target	
2023–24	19.3	▲5.51%	Above 18.5 million target	
2024–25	20	▲3.55%	Above 18.9 million target	
2025–26	~23	▲15%	Above 19 million target	

* A passenger trip (journey) is defined by MyCiTi. It "is calculated from the first boarding of a bus at a feeder stop or main station, to the last exit from a bus at a feeder stop or main station, and includes any transfers between buses (single journey)".

== Fleet ==
In 2026, MyCiTi operated a fleet of 347 buses, of various types.

Vehicle	Length	Passenger capacity	Type	Introduced into fleet circa	Manufacturer	Production	Ref
Volvo B12MA	18 m	131	Diesel	2010	Volvo Buses	—	
Volvo B7RM	12 m	80	Diesel	2010	Volvo Buses	—	
Volvo B7R	12 m	86	Diesel	2010–2012	Volvo Buses	—	
Optare Solo SR	9 m	50	Diesel	2012–2013	Optare	South Africa (assembled by Busmark 2000 from imported kits)	
Scania K250	12 m	93	Diesel	2014–2015	Scania AB	South Africa (body assembled by Busmark 2000)	
Scania K310	18 m	132	Diesel	2015	Scania AB	South Africa (body assembled by Busmark 2000)	
Volvo B9L	12 m	70	Diesel	2014	Volvo Buses	South Africa (body assembled by Busmark 2000)	
Volvo B9LA	18 m	124	Diesel	2014–2015	Volvo Buses	South Africa (body assembled by Busmark 2000)	
Volvo BZRLE	12 m	59	Battery electric	2027 (planned)	Volvo Buses	South Africa (body manufactured by Gauteng Bus and Coach Center in Johannesburg)	

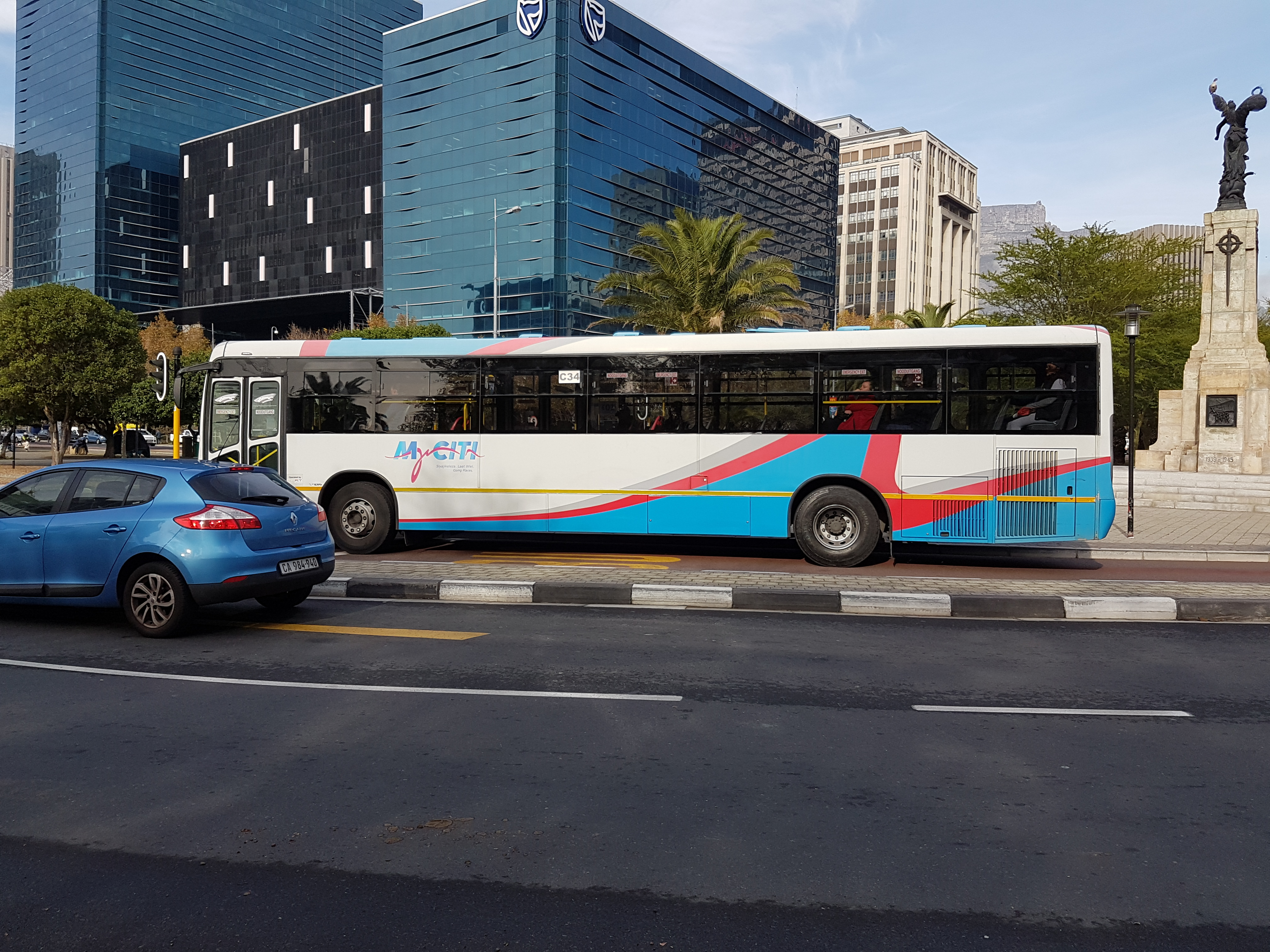
MyCiTi bus in the Foreshore

The MyCiTi fleet consists of a mixture of low-floor and high-floor buses of different sizes, designed for use on both dedicated bus rapid transit infrastructure and conventional roads. The fleet includes 9-meter Optare Solo buses, 12-meter and 18-meter Volvo buses, and 12-meter and 18-meter Scania buses. The smaller Optare buses are used primarily on feeder services, while the larger buses are used on trunk and express routes.

The original fleet was introduced during the first phase of the MyCiTi system. It included 9-meter Optare Solo SR buses for feeder routes, as well as 12-meter and 18-meter buses supplied by Volvo and Scania for trunk and express services. Bus bodies for many of the buses were assembled in South Africa by Busmark 2000, including at its manufacturing facilities in Cape Town and Gauteng.

The fleet is being progressively renewed and expanded as the MyCiTi network is extended. In 2026, the City introduced its first battery electric MyCiTi bus, a 12-meter Volvo BZRLE, which underwent testing on a range of routes and operating conditions. The City subsequently confirmed an order for 38 battery electric buses, with deliveries scheduled through March 2027. The buses are intended primarily for the planned expansion of MyCiTi services in the southeastern part of the metro, including routes between Mitchells Plain and Khayelitsha; Wynberg and Claremont; and those running to Cape Town CBD.

The electric buses are being introduced alongside the existing diesel fleet rather than replacing it immediately. The City and the University of Cape Town are conducting research into battery performance, energy consumption, charging requirements, passenger loading, route profiles, maintenance, and operating costs before the wider deployment of electric buses. The City has indicated that the first electric buses are expected to enter scheduled passenger service in 2027. In October 2026, the first seven electric buses were delivered, and the City said it expected a further 13 to be delivered the following month, with the rest of the initial order arriving between January and March 2027.

In 2023, when it had a total fleet size of 361, over 58% of all MyCiTi buses were small capacity, 9-meter Optare Solo SRs. That year, MyCiTi operated the following numbers of each bus type:

- Optare Solo SR: 212
- Scania K250: 40
- Volvo B7RM: 34
- Scania K310: 23
- Volvo B9L: 19
- Volvo B9LA: 15
- Volvo B7R: 10
- Volvo B12MA: 8

== Network ==
MyCiTi bus-only traffic signal in Cape Town CBD

Initially created to serve the West Coast corridor, the MyCiTi BRT system has expanded significantly.

West Coast Corridor

The system's first phase connected areas like Table View, Blaauwberg, Dunoon, and Atlantis, where public transport options were previously limited, and no rail service existed. This pilot route addressed congestion along the coastal R27 road and supported economic links between the dormitory town of Atlantis and central Cape Town. It also partners with the city's minibus taxi industry.

Central Cape Town and Feeder Services

The central city is a hub for MyCiTi services, with routes connecting to major destinations such as Gardens, the V&A Waterfront, and Salt River. The 102 route links Salt River with the Civic Centre via District 6 and Woodstock, serving Cape Peninsula University of Technology students and connecting to rail and Golden Arrow services.

Century City

MyCiTi offers direct access to Century City, a growing mixed-use development, with multiple routes connecting surrounding communities. The T04 route between Dunoon and Century City is a vital link, alongside services from Montague Gardens, Summer Greens, and Milnerton.

N2 Express

Launched in 2014, the N2 Express routes connect Mitchells Plain and Khayelitsha with Cape Town's Civic Centre, providing an essential service to these densely populated areas. Routes such as D01, D02, and D03 offer convenient access to hospitals, schools, and local amenities, laying the foundation for a larger network planned for Cape Town's southeast.

City Bowl and Atlantic Seaboard

The MyCiTi network extensively serves Cape Town's central business district and Atlantic Seaboard, with routes linking popular destinations like Table Mountain, Camps Bay, and Hout Bay. Stations at Civic Centre, Adderley, and Gardens accommodate over 200,000 passengers monthly. Routes to Sea Point, Fresnaye, and Imizamo Yethu cater to both locals and tourists, offering affordable travel to scenic and cultural hotspots.

The key routes of the MyCiTi BRT service include:

- Dunoon–Table View–Civic Centre–Waterfront
- Atlantis–Table View–Civic Centre
- Century City–Montague Gardens
- Salt River–Walmer Estate–Civic Centre
- Hout Bay–Sea Point–Adderley
- Khayelitsha East–Civic Centre
- Mitchells Plain East–Civic Centre

=== Stations ===
MyCiTi bus at the Civic Centre Station in Cape Town CBD

MyCiTi station in Milnerton

==== Station artwork ====
In October 2010 the City of Cape Town put out a call for proposals for artists and designers to create artwork on the glass panels at the entrance of the MyCiTi stations.

In February 2026, the City again invited the public to submit artwork proposals for the MyCiTi system. The City stated that concept proposals for public artwork would be accepted over a period of around a month, and would be considered for use at the new Claremont MyCiTi station. The new station was the first and largest station on the Metro South-East Corridor (Phase 2A). The City said the initiative's goal was to celebrate local creativity, while also enhancing public transport spaces and the commuter experience.

== Development ==
=== Phase 1A ===
The Blaauwberg–Dunoon–Atlantis corridor was prioritised due to its severe traffic congestion, which was expected to worsen with future development. This area faced some of the highest congestion levels in the city, making it a critical focus for intervention.

Key factors influencing the decision to prioritize this corridor included the fact that while minibus taxis are one of Cape Town's most popular modes of transport, their presence within this corridor was limited. This shortage made commuting in and out of the area increasingly challenging, forcing many residents to rely on private vehicles, which further exacerbated traffic congestion.

This corridor also included a potential to attract a larger catchment of commuters who might otherwise rely on private vehicles thereby reducing congestion and promoting the use of public transport. Additionally, the limited presence of minibus taxi operators in the area offered a more controlled environment to implement and evaluate new transport solutions and strategies, making it an ideal setting for testing the feasibility and effectiveness of the proposed transportation intervention.

=== Phase 2A ===
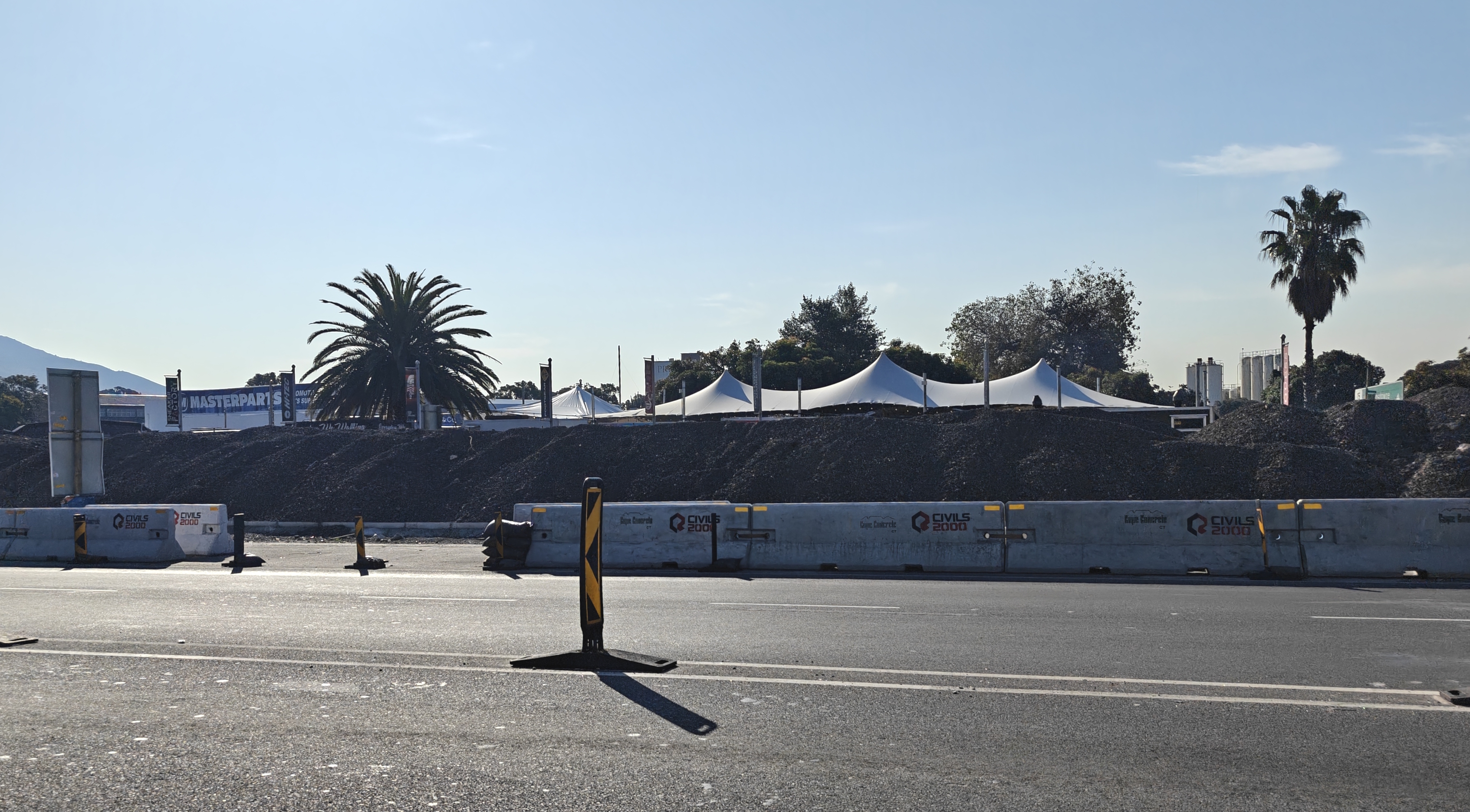
MyCiTi Phase 2A expansion roadworks in Kenilworth

Phase 2A is a multi-year expansion project for the MyCiTi bus service, that commenced with construction in 2023. This phase will extend the network from Khayelitsha and Mitchells Plain to Wynberg and Claremont. Funding for the project comes from municipal rates, as well as the national government.

The new phase is valued at over R4 billion, and once complete, is expected to connect 35 new suburbs and 1.4 million residents, as well as transport up to 100,000 passengers per day, reducing traffic and carbon emissions in the city.

Key Features of Phase 2A

The backbone of Phase 2A will operate along Govan Mbeki Road, with trunk routes traveling through dedicated bus lanes. Stations along these routes will enable commuter transfers.

Beyond transport improvements, the project incorporates significant upgrades to infrastructure, including roads, intersections, and public spaces. Features such as landscaping, wider pavements, improved street lighting, public art, and signage aim to revitalise the corridor, boost the local economy, and attract further development.

Planned Trunk Routes

The concept design for the main routes and stations was approved in 2016, with a subsequent portion approved in 2019 after extensive public participation. Drawing from lessons learned during Phase 1, Phase 2A will serve diverse communities, including:

- Mitchells Plain, Lentegeur, Phola Park
- Khayelitsha, Nolungile
- Gugulethu, Crossroads, Manenberg, Hanover Park
- Philippi, Nyanga, Ottery, Plumstead, Diep River
- Strandfontein, Claremont, Wynberg, Constantia, Hout Bay

The various routes of the MyCiTi Phase 2A project includes

East Packages:

- E1: Heinz Road
- E2: Emms Drive
- E3: Govan Mbeki Road, Philippi
- E4: Morgenster Road
- E5: Spine Road
- E6: AZ Berman Drive
- E7: Mew Way
- E8: Stock Road

West Packages:

- W1: Imam Haron Road
- W2: Turf Hall Road
- W3: Jan Smuts Drive (Lansdowne)
- W4: Govan Mbeki Road (Hanover Park, Philippi, Wynberg)
- W5: Ottery
- W6: Wynberg Couplet
- W8: South Road

Depots and Staging Facilities

- Spine Road Depot
- Wynberg Depot

Additional Infrastructure:

- Lentegeur Pedestrian Bridge

Stations and Public Transport Interchanges (PTIs)

- Stations: Claremont

PTIs: Vuyani PTI, Nyanga PTI, Wynberg PTI

=== Phase 3 ===
Phase 3 is set to connect Cape Town CBD, the city's main commercial node, with Bellville, the city's second-largest commercial area.

=== Phase 4 ===
The 4th and final phase of the initial MyCiTi development plan will have the system connect Cape Town with Stellenbosch - a town located around 50 km away from the city.

== See also ==
- City of Cape Town
