= Parklands College =

Private & boarding school in Parklands, Western Cape, South Africa

Location
- 91 Raats Drive & 50 Wood Drive, Parklands and 1 College Avenue, Sandown; Blouberg, Western Cape, 7441; South Africa; 33.8177°S 18.5090°E

Information
- School type: Private & Boarding
- Motto: Latin: Virtus per Scientiam (Strength through knowledge)
- Religious affiliation: Christian
- Founded: 1980; 46 years ago
- Founder: Lorraine Roth
- School district: District 9
- Grades: 12 months – Grade 12
- Campus: Wood Drive Campus (foundation phase); Raats Drive Campus (intermediate phase); Sandown Campus (secondary)
- Houses: Oxford; Yale; Cambridge; Harvard
- Colors: Blue; White
- Slogan: Reaching Outwards, Growing Minds, Building Futures
- Accreditation: National Senior Certificate, DoE
- Website: parklands.co.za

Parklands College and Christopher Robin Pre-Primary are private schools situated in Parklands, near Cape Town, South Africa. The college is managed by a board of directors represented by the managing director.

== History ==
In 1980, Lorraine Roth opened the Christopher Robin Pre-Primary School.

The Western Seaboard was identified as a potential growth area through a research process that included consultation with the South African Department of Education. This was further supported by statistics provided by the town planning department of the Cape Town City Council. This research indicated that an independent school would complement the development of the new city and suburb of Parklands.

=== Secondary ===
- Cultural Activities: Debating, Public Speaking, Trinity Drama, Music, Dance
- Music: Piano, Clarinet, Saxophone, Recorder, Flute, Drums, Choir, Acapella, Orchestra, Violin, Cello, Voice, Guitar, Marimba, Drumline Dance: Ballet, Tap, Modern Dance
- Clubs & Societies: Book Club, Culinary, First Aid, Flashmob (Film and Photography), Freestyle Dancing, Fashion Design and Modelling, Laboratory Assistants, Jam Club (Guitar), Chess, Umpiring and Refereeing, Art, Rotary Interact (Outreach), Peer Counselling, Film Club, Sound Engineering & Mathematics Olympiad
- Sport: Rugby, Cricket, Soccer, Netball, Swimming, Tennis, Girls’ Softball, Waterpolo, Girls’ Hockey, Boys' Hockey

== Technical educationy ==
Parklands College offers comprehensive information and communication technology programmes including:

- Apple certification programs
- International Computer Driving License Training & Testing Centre
- CompTIA Partner

The college has also participated in a number of national and international STEM initiatives, including collaborating on experiments with the South African National Space Agency.

== School crest and motto ==
The school takes its arms from the Roth family. The arms are described as Blazen of Arms Azure, a unicorn rampant argent. Crest a unicorn, issuant.

== Scholarships ==
New learners applying to enter the secondary faculty are required to write an entrance assessment, which will assess the learner's ability in English and mathematics. Scholarships may be awarded to students on merit.

== Past matriculation results ==
| | 2000 | 2001 | 2002 | 2003 | 2004 | 2005 | 2006 | 2007 |
|---|---|---|---|---|---|---|---|---|
| Candidates | 7 | 11 | 20 | 31 | 30 | 26 | 43 | 43 |
| Passed | 7 | 11 | 20 | 31 | 30 | 26 | 43 | 43 |
| Matric Exemptions | 5 | 10 | 15 | 29 | 26 | 24 | 36 | 31 |
| A Aggregates | 1 | 2 | 3 | 3 | 2 | 7 | 7 | 5 |
| B and C Aggregates | 2 | 6 | 3 | 19 | 16 | 13 | 27 | 20 |

New Curriculum NSC (National Senior Certificate) 2011

| | 2008 | 2009 | 2010 | 2011 | 2012 | 2013 | 2014 | 2015 | 2016 |
|---|---|---|---|---|---|---|---|---|---|
| Candidates | 51 | 46 | 35 | 49 | 61 | 65 | 86 | 105 | 77 |
| Passed | 51 | 46 | 35 | 49 | 61 | 65 | 86 | 105 | 77 |
| Admission to bachelor's degree | 39 | 40 | 30 | 47 | 53 | 62 | 80 | 92 | 73 |
| Admission to Diploma | 9 | 5 | 4 | 1 | 8 | 3 | 6 | 11 | 4 |
| Admission to Higher Certificate | 2 | 0 | 1 | 1 | 0 | 0 | 0 | 0 | 0 |
