= Blouberg =

Blouberg (literally meaning blue mountain) can refer to:

- Blouberg, Western Cape, a group of suburbs north of Cape Town and comprises Bloubergstrand, Table View and Parklands among other suburbs
  - Bloubergstrand, a beach town near Cape Town named after the mountain
- Blouberg (range), a rocky range in Limpopo Province
- Blouberg Local Municipality, a municipality in Limpopo Province named after the range
- Blouberg Nature Reserve, a protected area close to Vivo, in the Limpopo Province of South Africa
