= Milnerton =

Seaside town in the Western Cape, South Africa

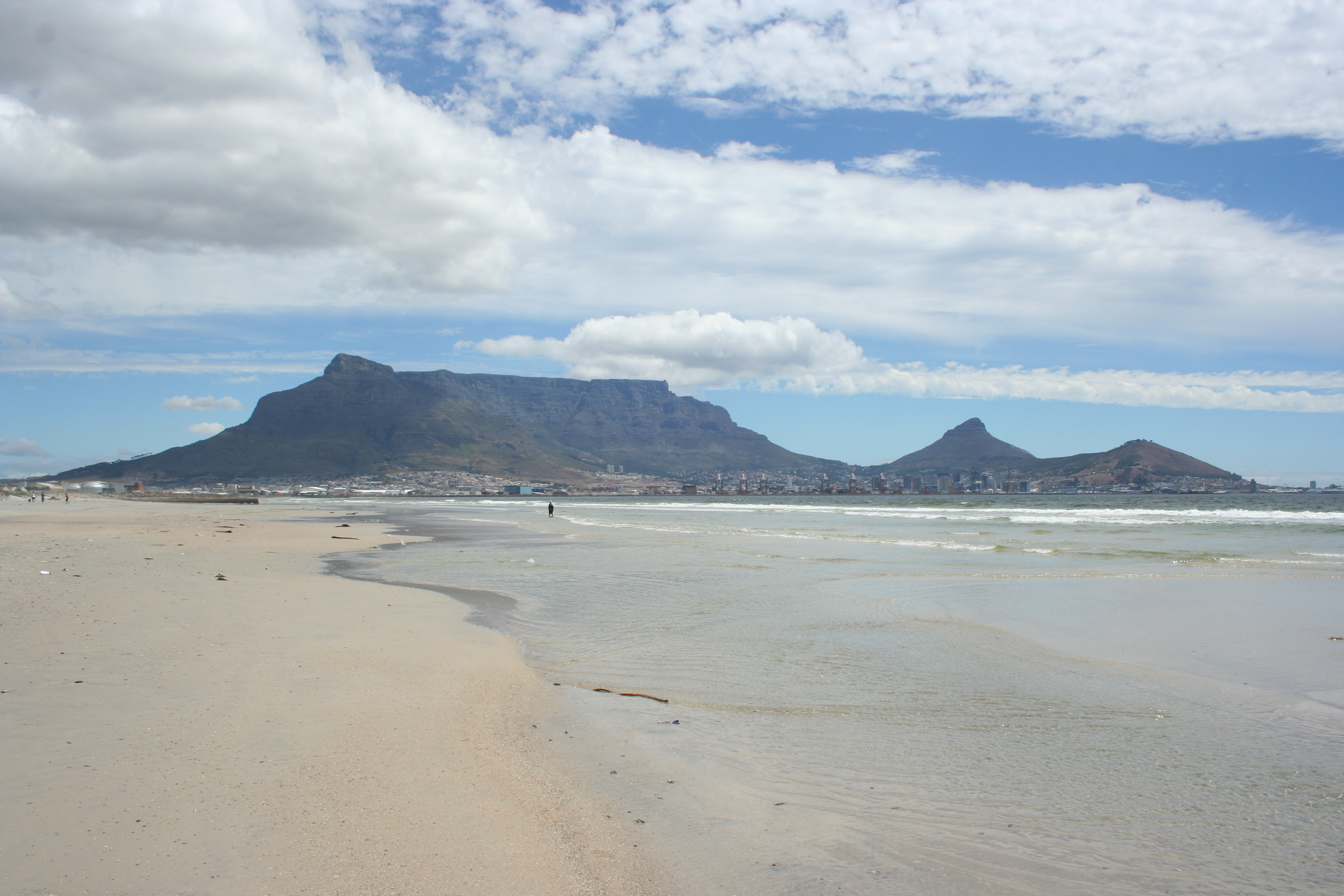
- View of Table Mountain from Milnerton beach
- Interactive map of Milnerton
- Coordinates: 33°52′S 18°30′E
- Country: South Africa
- Province: Western Cape
- Municipality: City of Cape Town

Area
  - Total: 43.70 km^{2} (16.87 sq mi)

Population (2011)
  - Total: 95,630
  - Density: 2,188/km^{2} (5,668/sq mi)

Racial makeup (2011)
  - Black African: 29.9%
  - Coloured: 17.3%
  - Indian/Asian: 2.6%
  - White: 47.7%
  - Other: 2.4%

First languages (2011)
  - English: 55.5%
  - Afrikaans: 18.0%
  - Xhosa: 14.0%
  - Other: 12.4%
- Time zone: UTC+2 (SAST)
- Postal code (street): 7441
- PO box: 7435
- Area code: 021

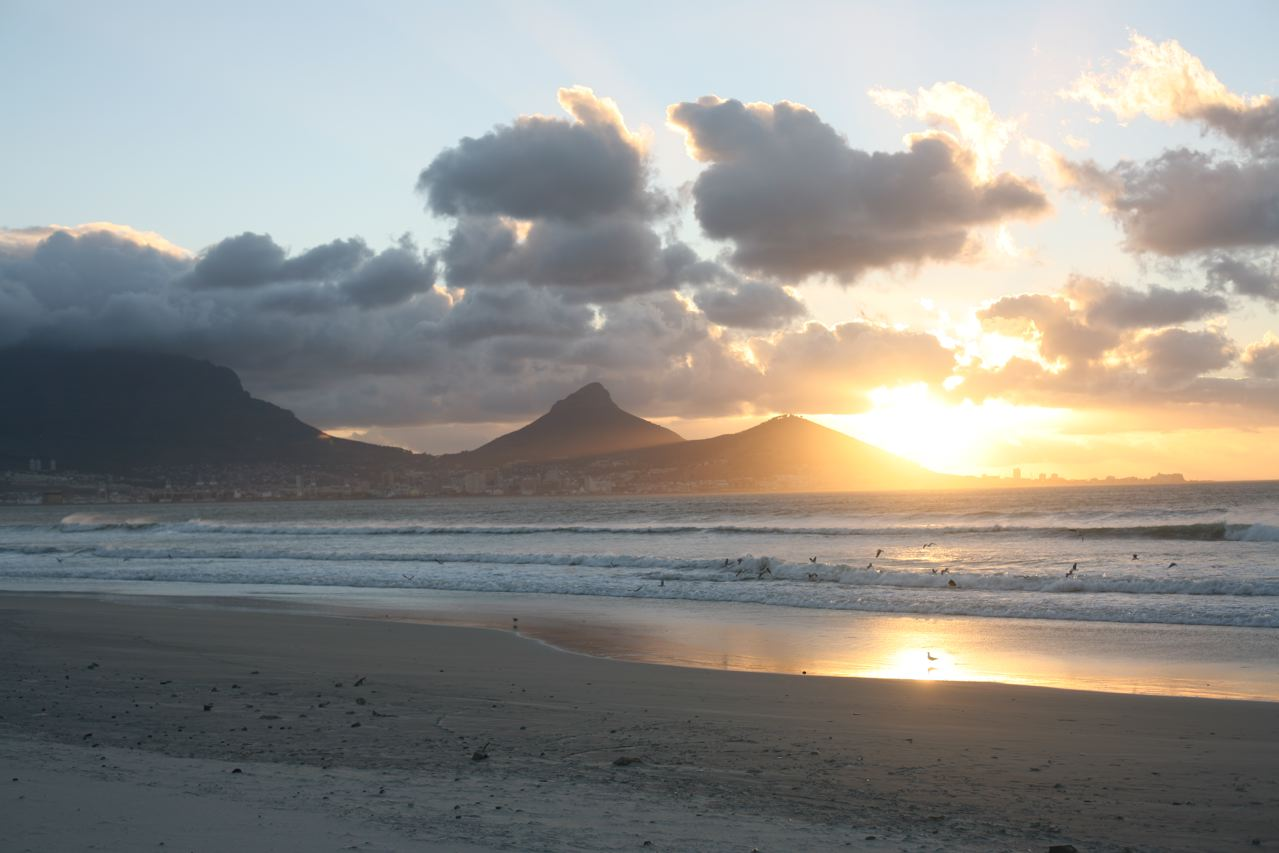
View from Milnerton beach towards Cape Town, showing Table Mountain, Lion's Head and Signal Hill.

Milnerton is a seaside town on Table Bay and is located north of Cape Town in South Africa. It is located 11 kilometres to the north of the city's CBD. In terms of the City of Cape Town metro's planning districts, Milnerton is considered a suburb in the Blaauwberg region. The area comprises a mix of residential, commercial, and industrial land.

== Geography ==
Milnerton lies on the Western Seaboard of Cape Town, also known as the Blaauwberg Coast, just north of the city along Table Bay. Although Milnerton is a town in its own right, it still regarded as a suburb of Cape Town. It is bordered by Cape Town and Goodwood to the south, Blouberg to the north and Parow to the east.

Much of the town is situated east of the Diep River lagoon (Milnerton Lagoon) with the exception of the coastal suburbs of Woodbridge Island, Sunset Links and Sunset Beach situated west of the lagoon. Milnerton Central, only about 0,1 km^{2} in size is situated between Marine Drive and Koeberg Road and is situated east of Woodbridge Island.

=== Suburban areas ===
Suburbs of the greater Milnerton area include:

- Bothasig
- Brooklyn
- Century City
- Edgemead
- Joe Slovo Park
- Lagoon Beach
- Marconi Beam
- Metro Industrial Township
- Milnerton Ridge
- Montague Gardens
- Monte Vista
- Paarden Eiland
- Phoenix
- Plattekloof Glen
- Rugby
- Sanddrift
- Summer Greens
- Sunset Beach
- Sunset Links Residential Estate
- Tijgerhof
- Woodbridge Island

== Area features ==
=== Milnerton lagoon ===
One of the most identifiable features of Milnerton is its lagoon, formed where the Diep River enters the sea, with palm trees adorning the lagoon banks.

The lagoon is also known as Schitt's Creek, due to the pungent smell that is emitted into the adjacent environment.

=== Woodbridge Island ===
Woodbridge Island is not actually an island, but rather the area south of Milnerton Golf Club on the peninsula separating the lagoon from the ocean. Two bridges join Woodbridge Island to the mainland of Milnerton proper. The wooden bridge is now a national heritage site,

Woodbridge Island was occupied by British troops during the 2^{nd} Anglo Boer Wat (1899-1902). In 1901 he Royal Engineers built the bridge using Jarrah Wood. It provided access to a Cannon Trench and was a defence against coastal attacks by the Boers.

The bridge went through an upgrade phase and has since been reopened to the public. A newer bridge allows cars to cross to the island. The Milnerton Lighthouse is also a popular landmark found on the island. The beach is a popular recreational area, especially over weekends and public holidays.

=== Milnerton beach ===
Milnerton's beach is well known for its view of Table Mountain and is a popular surfing spot. The water is generally cold as a result of the Benguela current that flows along Africa's western shore. The beach is also managed by Milnerton Surf Lifesaving Club, who help to prevent drownings on the beach and surrounding area. Every Wednesday during summer the surfski and stand up paddlers use the SE winds and race the Downwind Dash series to Big Bay beach.

=== Nature reserves ===
Milnerton is the location of two nature reserves which are owned and managed by the City of Cape Town. Part of the Table Bay Nature Reserve is situated inside the race tracks of the old Milnerton Racecourse.

== Transport ==
Golden Arrow bus next to a MyCiTi BRT station in Milnerton

The N7 (Cape Namibia Route) is the main highway bisecting Milnerton, running north–south from Malmesbury to Goodwood and passing the interchanges at Bosmansdam and Plattekloof Roads. The N1 highway borders Milnerton to the south, passing Century City and Paarden Eiland and runs east–west from Paarl to Cape Town. The R27 (Marine Drive; Otto du Plessis Drive) roughly runs north–south along the coast from Melkbosstrand and Table View towards Cape Town.

Milnerton is also served by five metropolitan routes linking it to surrounding towns and cities in the City of Cape Town. The M5 (Koeberg Road) runs N to S from Killarney Gardens to Muizenberg. The M8 (Bosmansdam Road) runs W to E from Milnerton to Plattekloof. The M12 (Giel Basson Drive) runs N to S from Burgundy Estate and Sunningdale to Parow and Goodwood. The M13 (Tygerberg Valley Drive) roughly runs W to E from Milnerton to Richwood and Durbanville. The M14 (Plattekloof Road) runs W to E from Milnerton to Plattekloof.

The area is well serviced by public transport, many of the MyCiTi bus routes run through the Milnerton area with routes T01 to T03 and D05 going through the R27 and bus routes running to and from Century City making use of designated bus lanes. The Golden Arrow Bus Service also operates as a private commuter-service in the Milnerton area.

== Commerce and industry ==
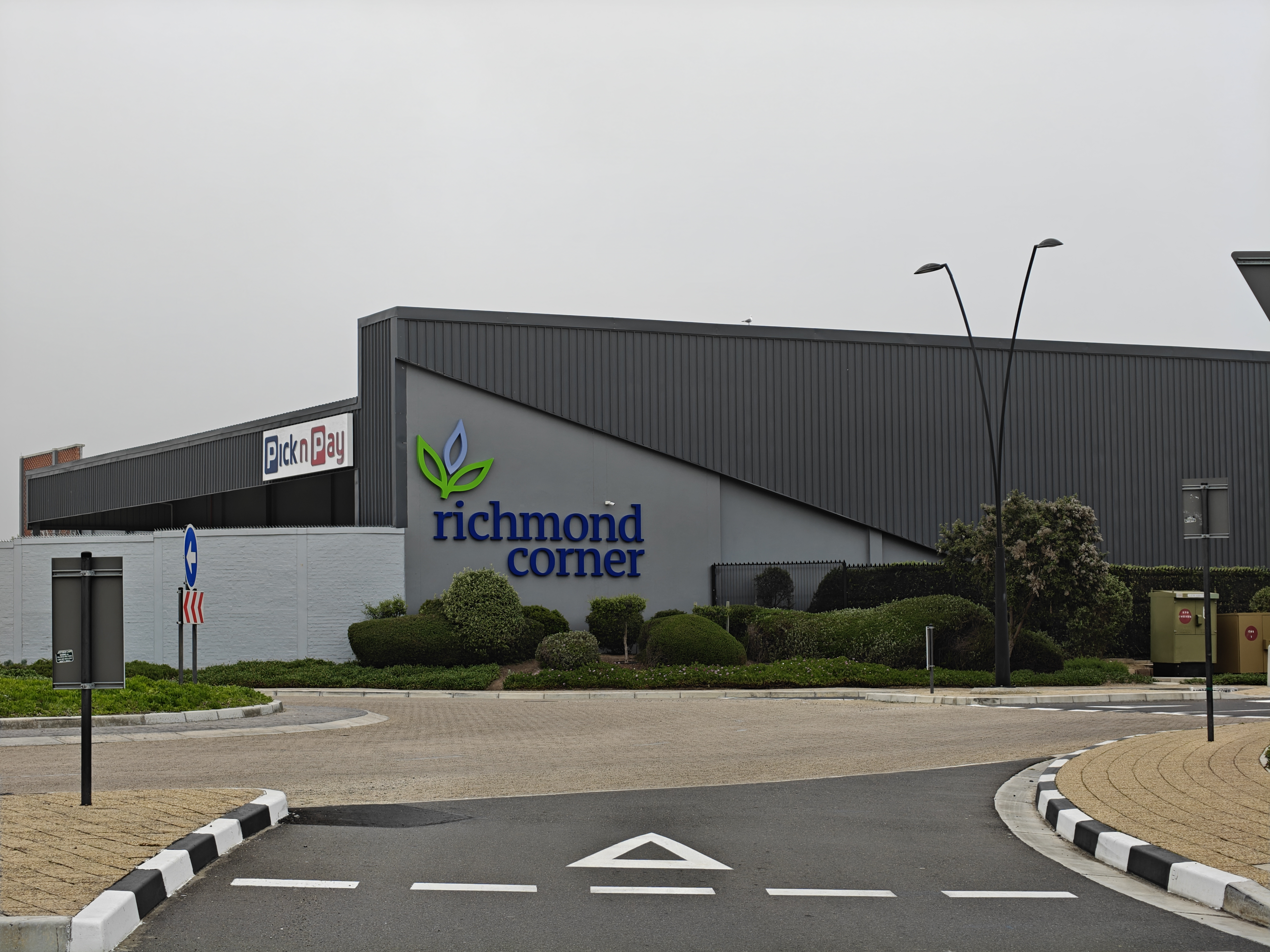
Richmond Corner shopping center in Richmond Park

Milnerton's sub-areas contain a broad mix of commercial and industrial sites, including:

- Canal Walk mall, within the broader Century City mixed-use development area
- The large Montague Gardens industrial area
- Paddocks Shopping Center
- Cape Grand China mall
- Part of the warehouse area of Richmond Park

== Coat of arms ==
Milnerton had its own municipality from 1955 to 1996. The town council assumed a coat of arms, designed by Cornelis Pama, in October 1963, and registered it with the Cape Provincial Administration in February 1966 and at the Bureau of Heraldry in February 1968.

The arms were : Per chevron ploye Or with two horse-shoe Gules, and barry wavy of eight Azure and Argent (i.e. the shield was divided by a curved chevron-shaped line, the upper part displaying two red horseshoes on a gold background and the lower part having eight silver and blue stripes with wavy edges).

The crest was a red demi-horse and the motto Per mare per terram.

== Notable residents ==
- Desmond Tutu, Anglican Arch Bishop.
- David Graaff, businessman and politician.
