= Killarney Gardens =

- Industrial area of Cape Town
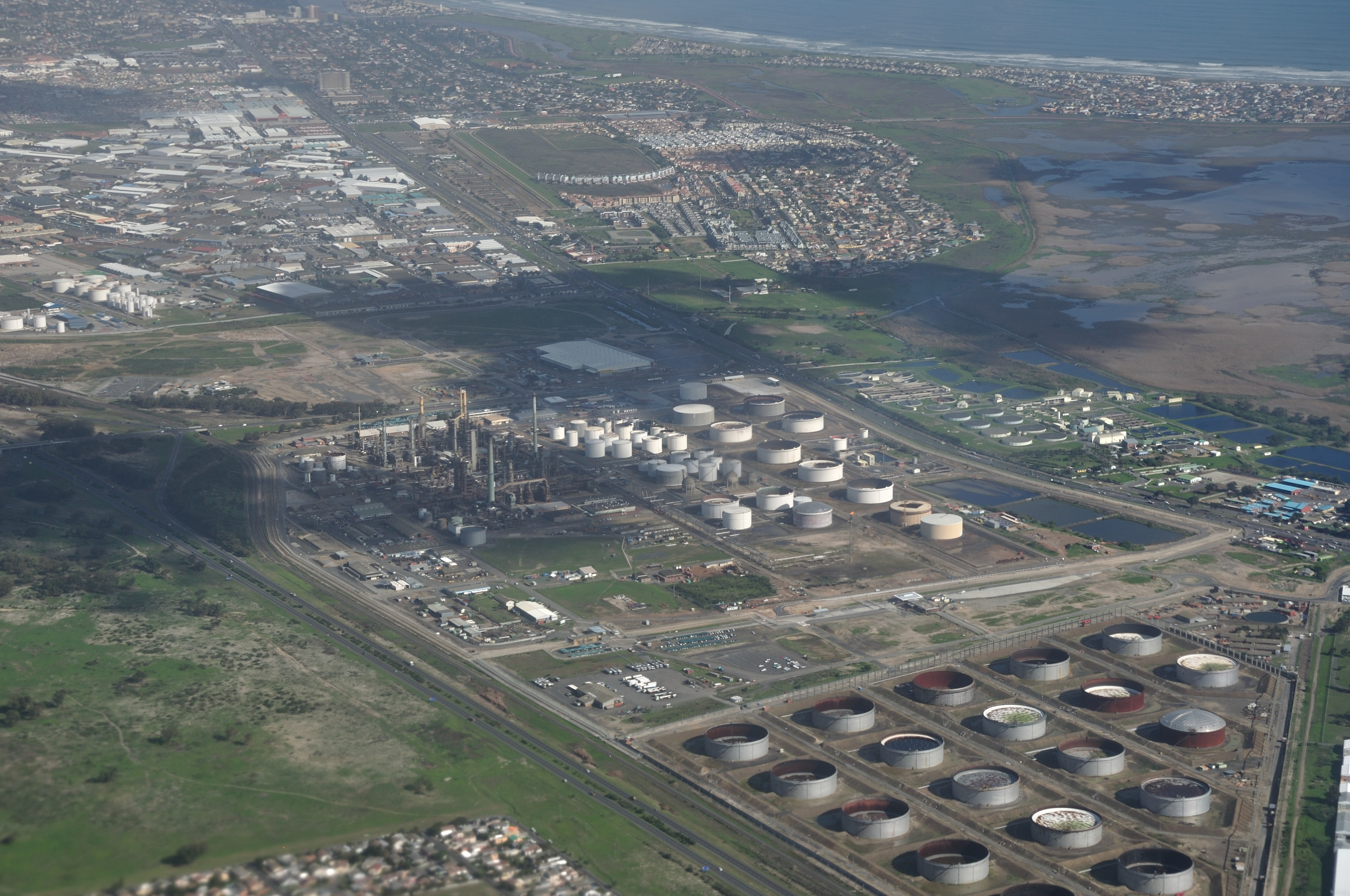
- View of Killarney Gardens
- Interactive map of Killarney Gardens
- Coordinates: 33.827°S 18.533°E
- Country: South Africa
- Province: Western Cape
- Municipality: City of Cape Town
- Main Place: Blouberg

Government
  - Councillor: Joy McCarthy (DA)

Area
  - Total: 1.09 km^{2} (0.42 sq mi)

Population (2011)
  - Total: 0
- Time zone: UTC+2 (SAST)
- Postal code (street): 7441
- Area code: 021

Killarney Gardens is an industrial area of Cape Town with no population or households. It is located about 30 minutes away from the harbour and the airport and situated off the M5 road (Potsdam Road), alongside the N7 freeway.

Neighbouring suburbs include Milnerton Rural, Dunoon, Richwood, and Flamingo Vlei.

The ward councillor for the area is Joy McCarthy from the Democratic Alliance.
