= Joe Slovo Park =

Suburb of Cape Town, in Western Cape, South Africa

- Interactive map of Joe Slovo Park
- Coordinates: 33°52′27″S 18°30′38″E
- Country: South Africa
- Province: Western Cape
- Municipality: City of Cape Town
- Main Place: Milnerton

Area
  - Total: 0.25 km^{2} (0.097 sq mi)

Population (2011)
  - Total: 12,629
  - Density: 51,000/km^{2} (130,000/sq mi)

Racial makeup (2011)
  - Black African: 95.2%
  - Coloured: 3.3%
  - Indian/Asian: 0.1%
  - White: 0.1%
  - Other: 1.3%

First languages (2011)
  - Xhosa: 66.3%
  - Afrikaans: 4.3%
  - English: 3.8%
  - Sotho: 2.4%
  - Other: 23.2%
- Time zone: UTC+2 (SAST)
- Postal code (street): 6665

Joe Slovo Park is a township located between Milnerton and Montague Gardens near Cape Town, South Africa.

== History ==
Joe Slovo Park is a small township which was designed to replace the shack settlement of Marconi Beam with an orderly working-class suburb. However it is now barely distinguishable from the informal settlement it was meant to replace.

One section of Joe Slovo Park is known as Mshini Wam, named after the struggle song Umshini wami which was often sung by Jacob Zuma in the run up to his election as president. It was founded in 2006 when it was erected in an open space ringed by formal RDP (Reconstruction and Development Programme) houses. Mshini Wam was plagued by fire and flooding. A re-blocking process was started in 2012 which will provide access to emergency services.

It was named after Joe Slovo, the anti-apartheid activist and former South African Minister of Housing.

It is not to be mistaken with Joe Slovo (in Langa, Cape Town).

== Geographic Distribution ==
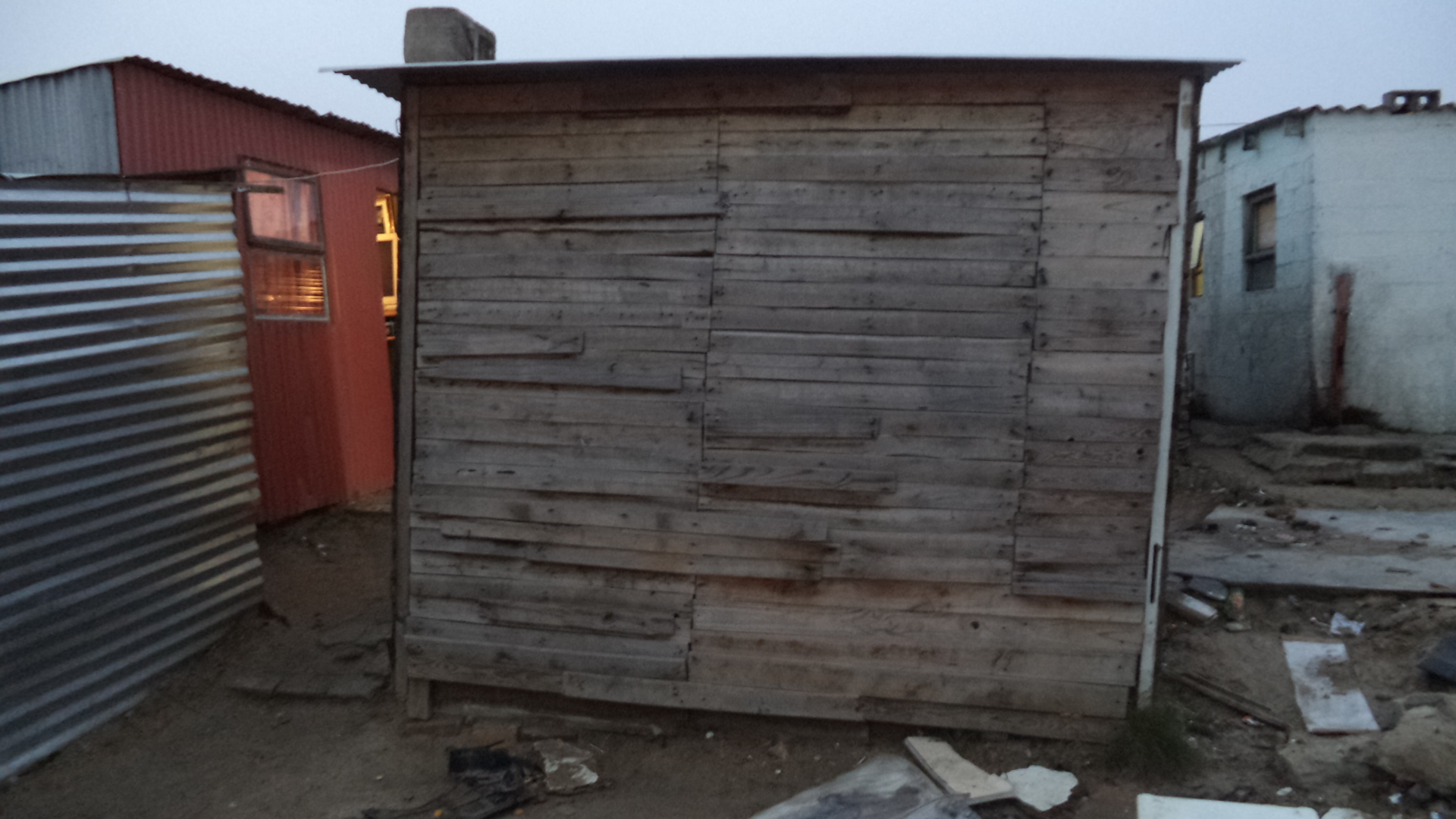
A typical shack in Joe Slovo Park. Photographed 2013

It is a mixture of fixed houses and shacks next to Montague Gardens in Milnerton.

Joe Slovo Park is near Canal Walk an upmarket shopping centre among some of the areas found in Milnerton.

== Controversies ==
There is great pressure from people wanting to build structures on open pieces of land. In October 2012 this led to protests when the City's Land Anti-Invasion Unit arrived to pull down structures built on city owned land.

Again in March 2014 residents of Joe Slovo Park started building an informal settlement on an open piece of land on Freedom Way in front of the Assemblies of God church and Sinenjongo high school.

The City of Cape Town had successfully applied for an interdict to prevent further structures being built on this land and when people refused to move the police arrived and dismantled the structures.

Later that day the affected community gathered and anger boiled over. The Assemblies of God church was petrol bombed as it was assumed that they were the ones who ordered the demolition. Threats were also made against the principal of Sinenjongo high school, Mrs Nopote. A series of meetings was subsequently held to clarify the situation.

Structures have subsequently been rebuilt and this piece of land is now fully occupied by shacks.

== Facilities ==
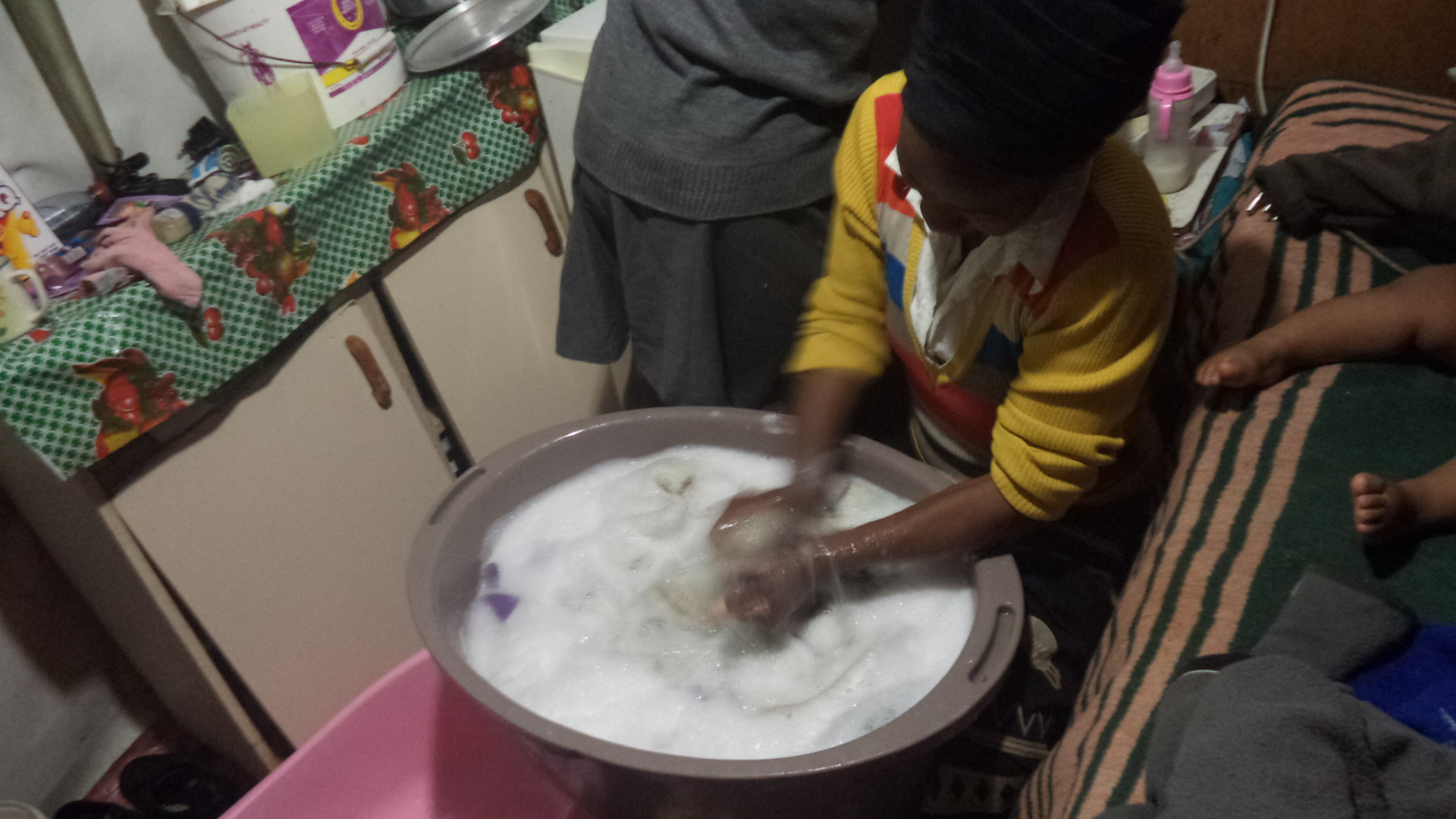
a woman in her shack home washing clothes by hand in a plastic container. This is typical in Joe Slovo Park

=== Educational ===
It has two schools of which one of them is a secondary school Sinenjongo High School and the other is a primary school Marconi Beam.

The nearest local library is almost a kilometre away from it, the Milnerton Library.

=== Health care services ===
The nearest health-care service providers are Albow-Gardens Clinic (public clinic) in Brooklyn Milnerton which is about 4 kilometres away and Medi-Clinic in Milpark, Milnerton (private hospital) which is about 800 metres away.

=== Safety and security ===
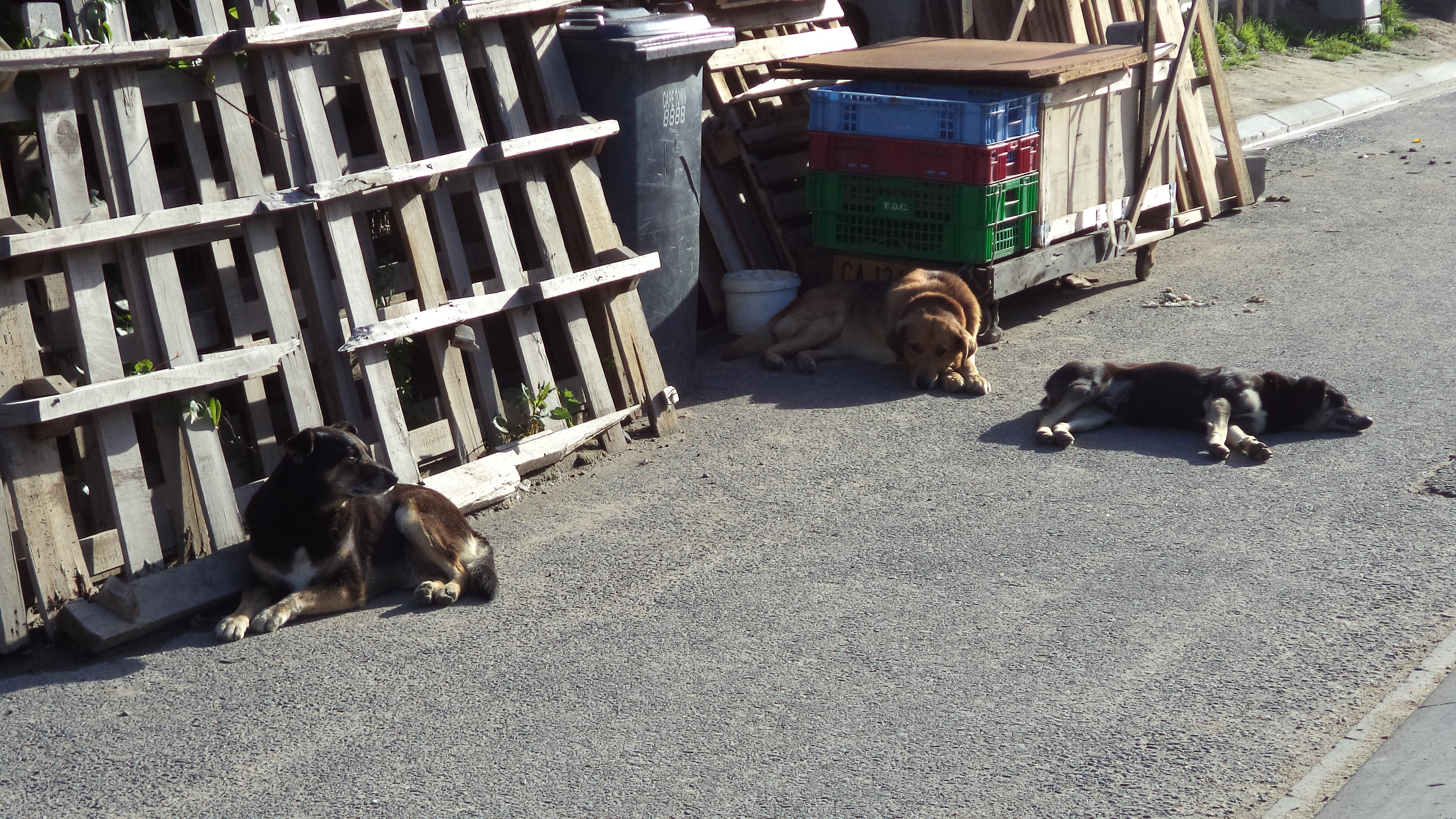
There are many street dogs in Joe Slovo Park

Some of the houses have security protection from security companies. However the vast majority depends on the local police's intervention. There is an almost 24/7 police patrol service for the community.

There is no police station. The nearest police station, a kilometre away in Milnerton. There is also no fire-brigade station except for the neighbouring Milnerton Fire Station.

=== Utilities and Government Offices ===
There is a community hall in Joe Slovo Park. A colourful mural was painted on the wall next to the hall on Mandela Day 18 July 2013.

There is a Municipal office close to Joe Slovo Park; it is near the Milnerton Library.

=== Photo Gallery ===
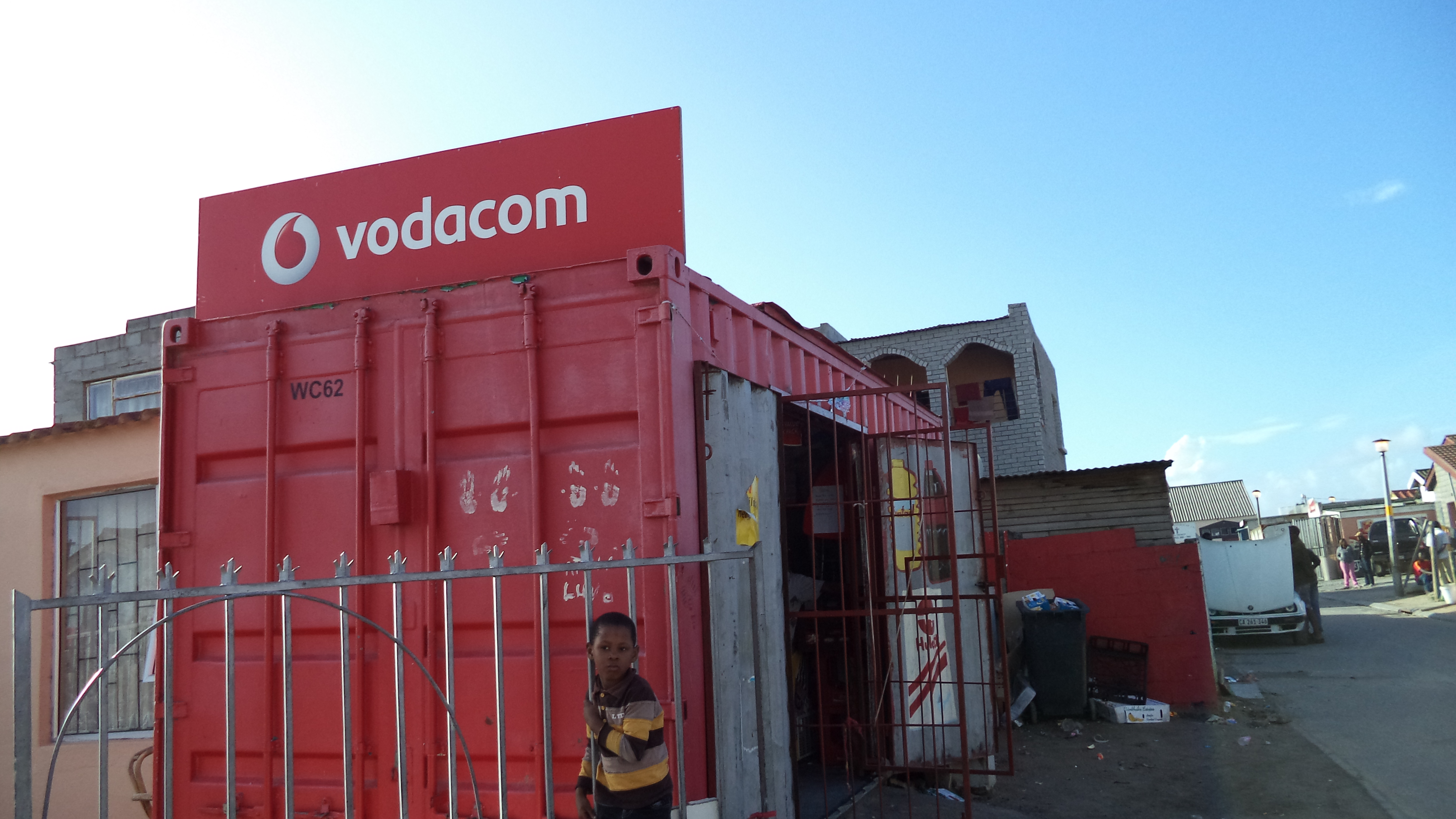
container shop in Joe Slovo Park. The suburb has many stores made from shipping containers.

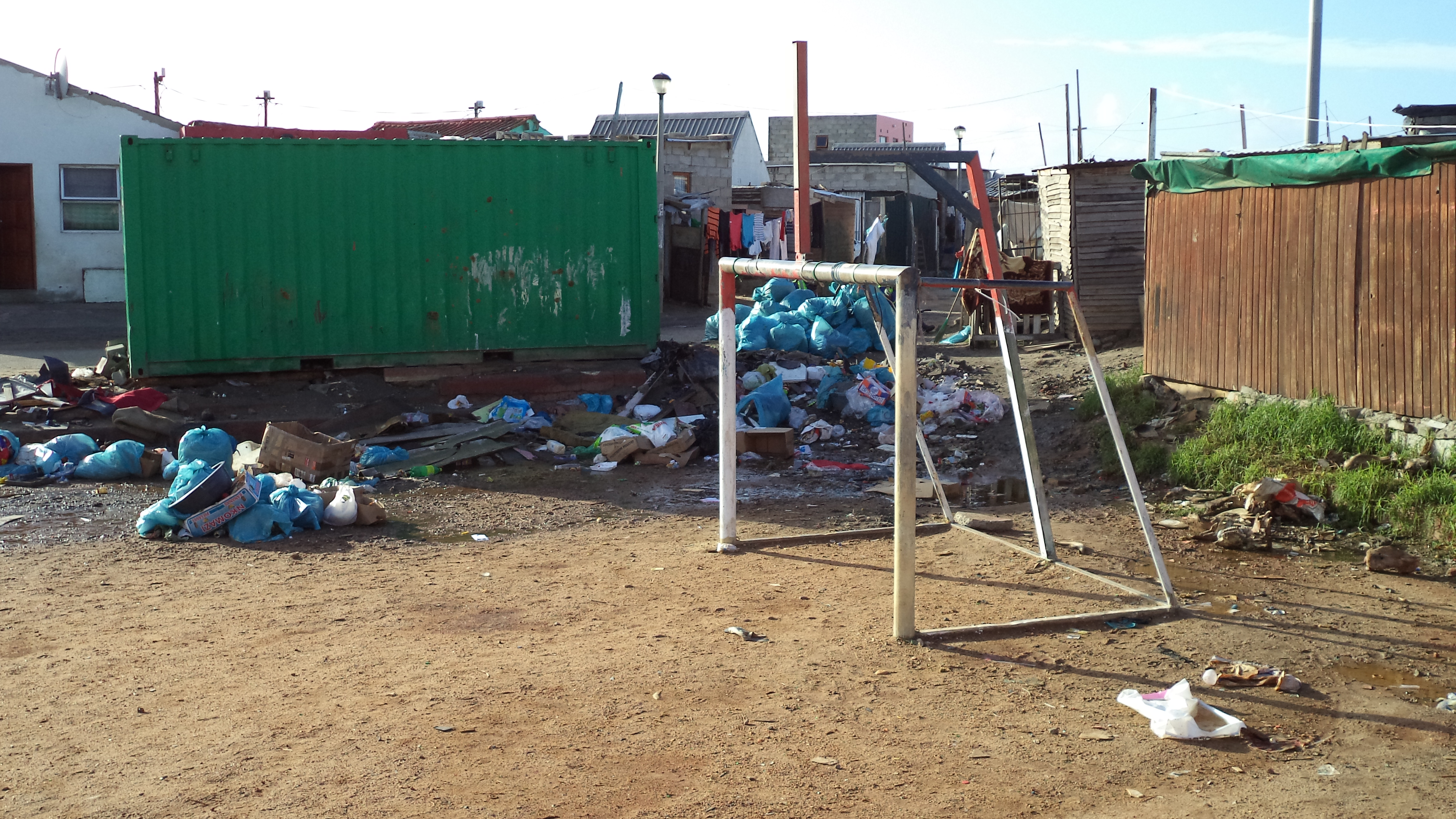
A dilapidated football playing field in Joe Slovo Park, filled with debris

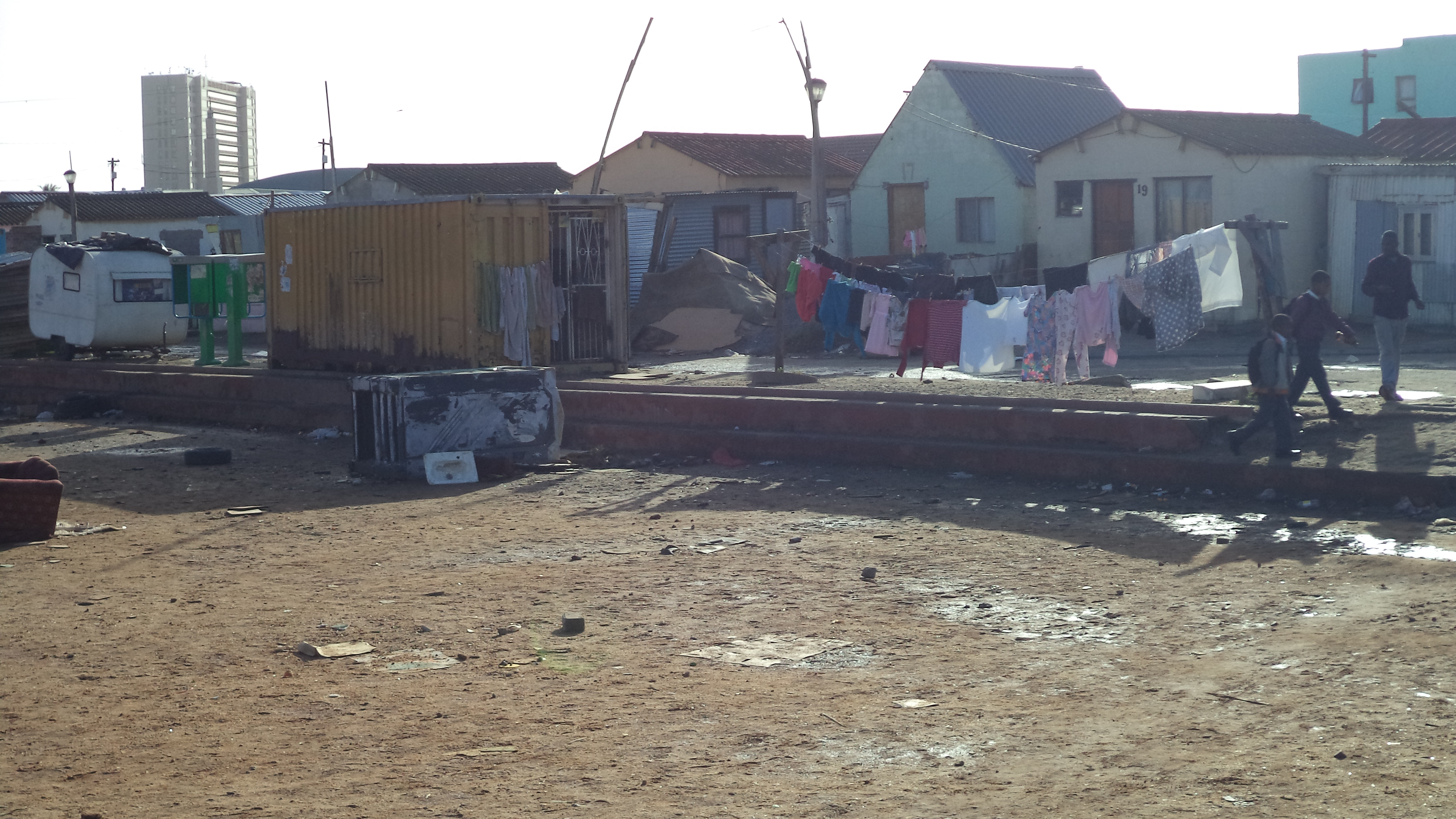
the same football field with an overturned latrine in the field

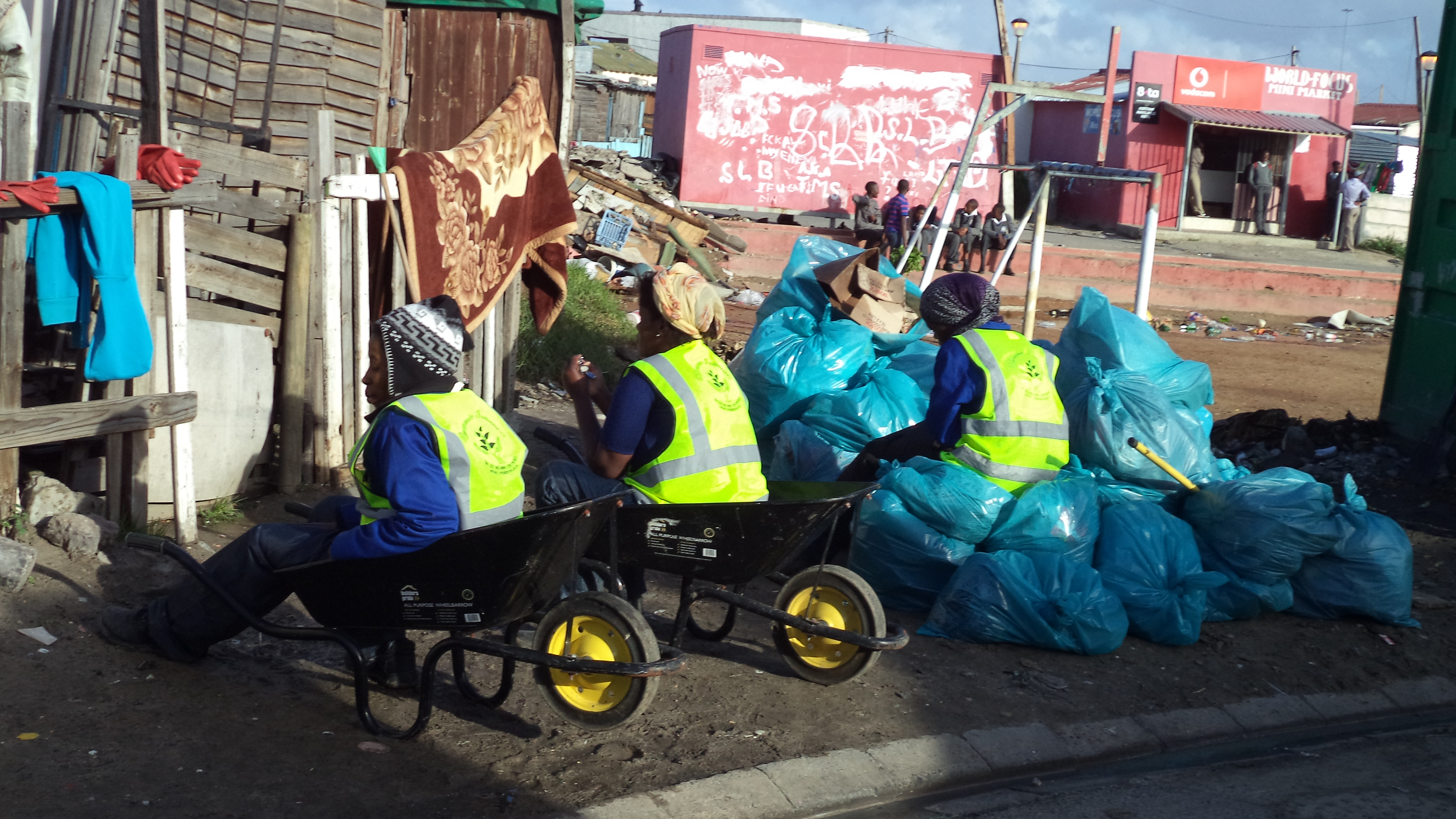
Street Cleaners in Joe Slovo Park, Dilapidated soccer field visible in the background

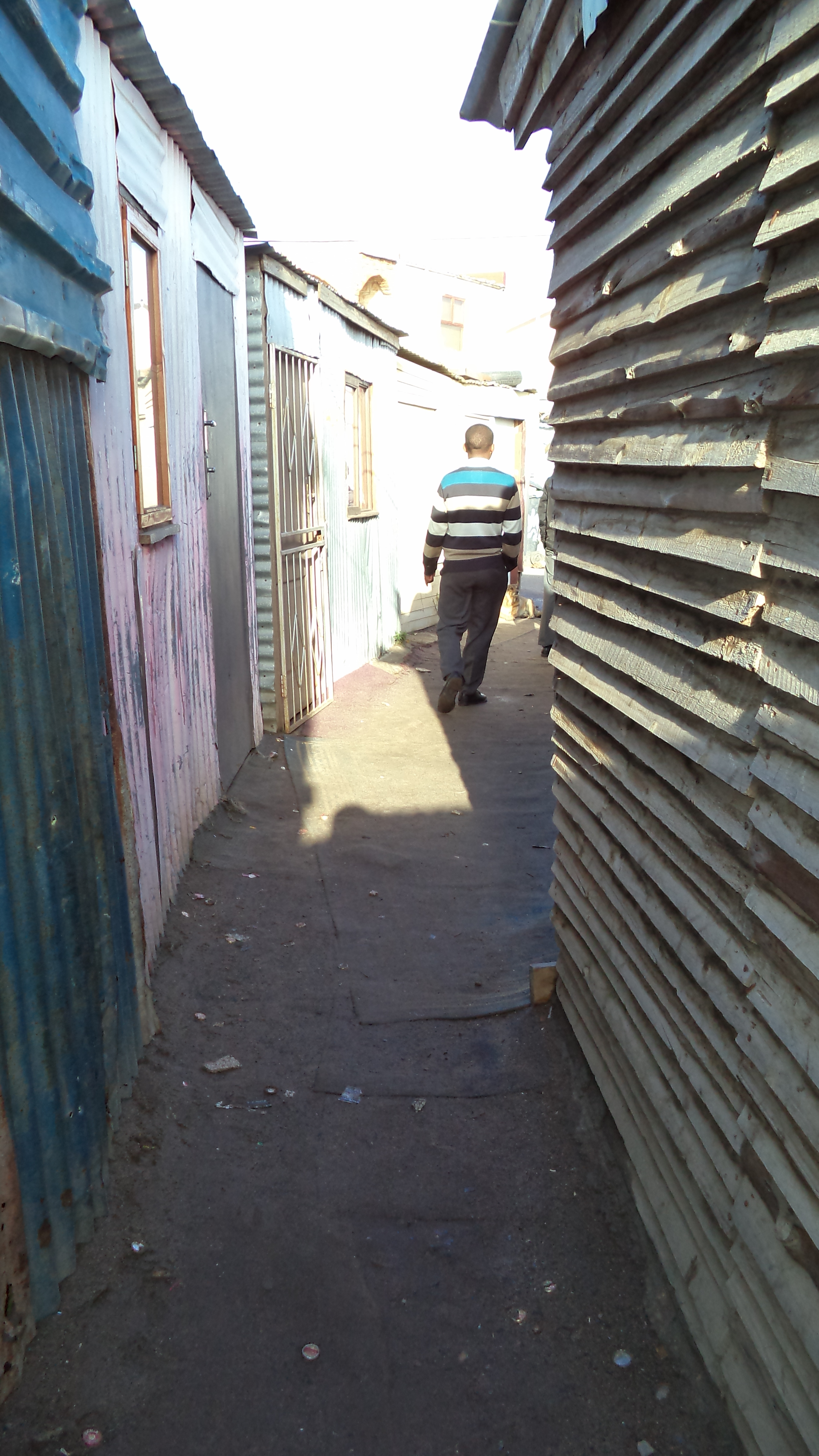
A well-worn path between shacks

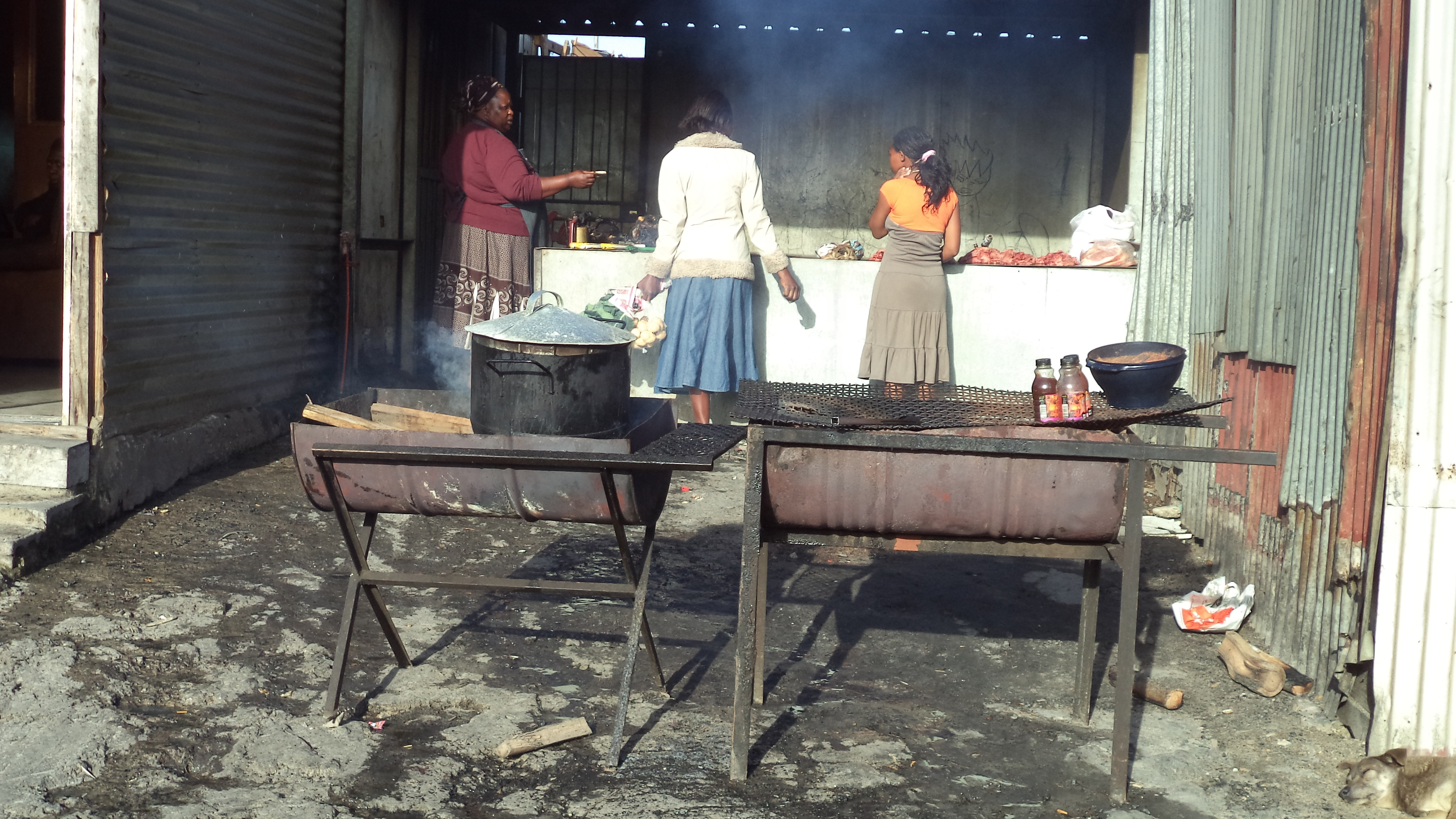
Street food - Sheep heads

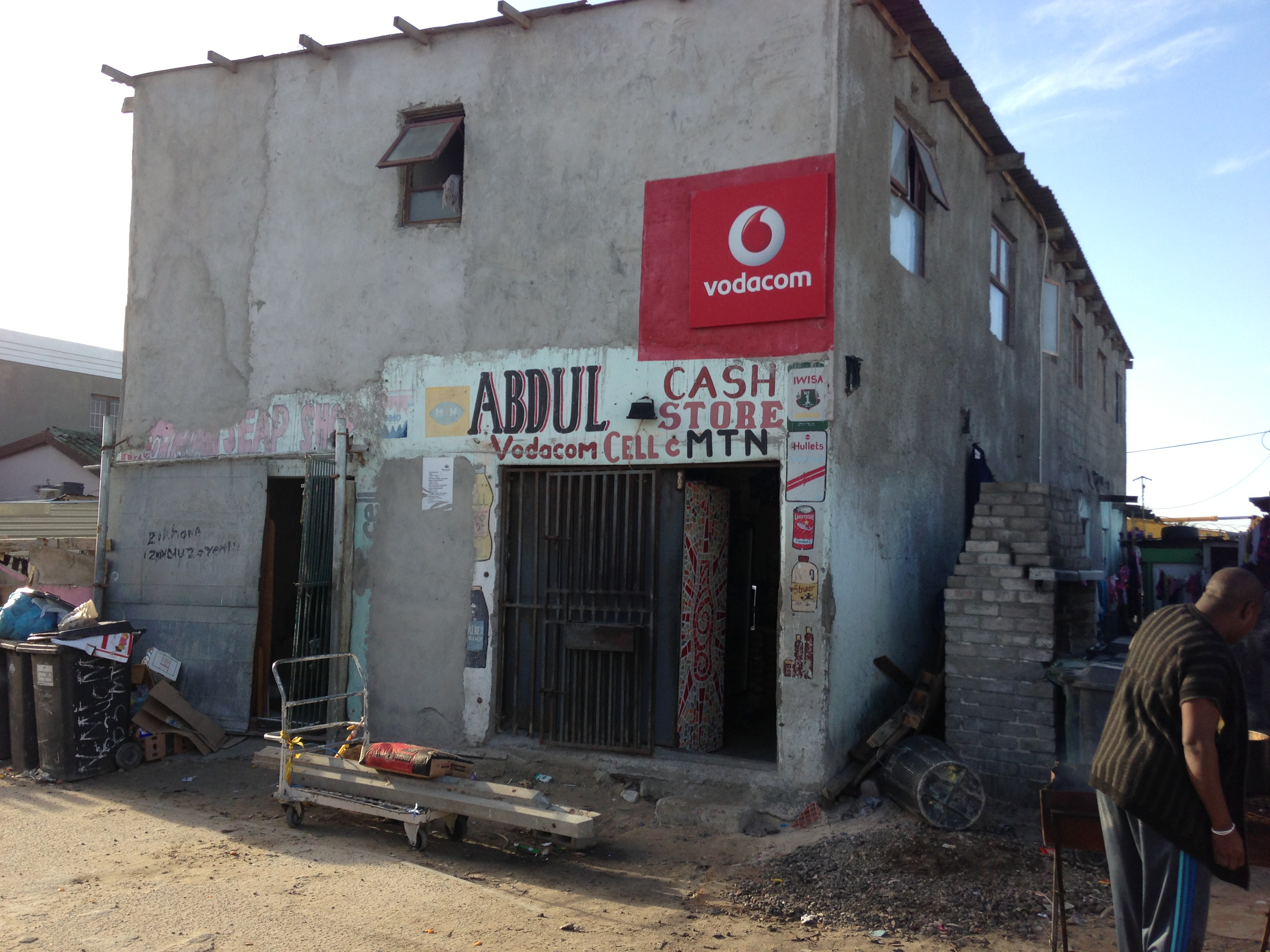
typical store in Joe Slovo Park
