= Moladi =

Moladi is a South African company specializing in a reusable plastic formwork for use in construction of affordable housing projects worldwide. The process involves creating a mold of the form of the complete structure. This wall mold is then filled with an aerated form of Mortar. The construction process is faster than traditional methods of construction.

The technology has won the Design for Development award of the South African Bureau of Standards Design Institute in 1997, with the institute praising Moladi as:

...an interlocking and modular formwork or shutter system for molding complex monolithic reinforced structures. The modular plastic panels are lightweight and extremely robust. The building method is especially suited for affordable low-cost, mass housing schemes.

In addition to being a part of the drive by the South African government to replace shantytowns with proper houses, Moladi also exports to 26 countries like Panama Democratic Republic of the Congo Tanzania and others. Moladi solves key low-cost challenges - The company production plant is based in Port Elizabeth

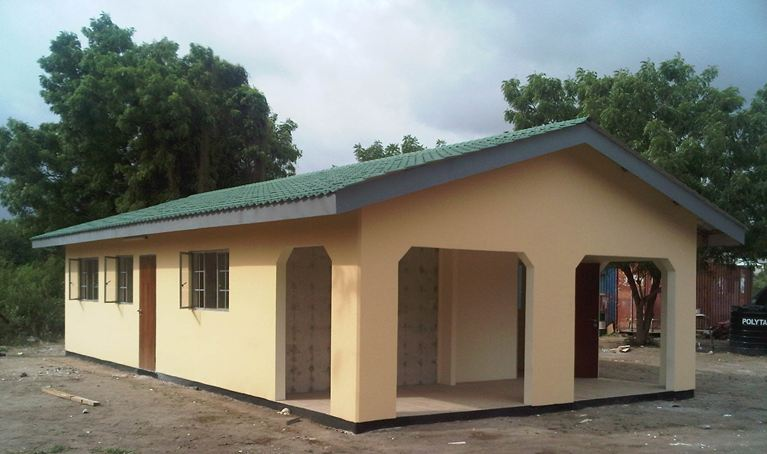
Low cost housing building construction system
