= Parklands, Western Cape =

Suburb of Cape Town, in Western Cape, South Africa

Parklands
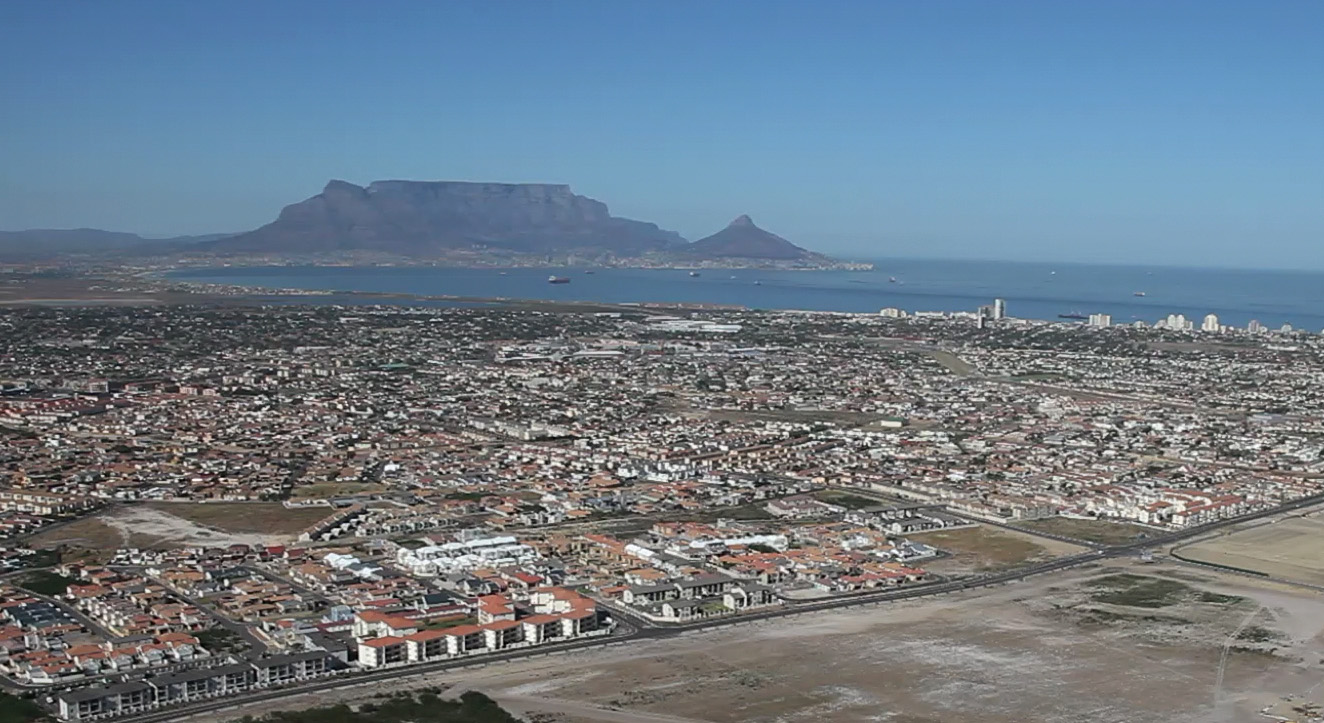

- Location within Western Cape Location within South Africa
- Coordinates: 33°48′52″S 18°30′09″E
- Country: South Africa
- Province: Western Cape
- Municipality: City of Cape Town
- Main Place: Blouberg

Government
  - Councillor: Meisie Sarah Makuwa (Ward 104) (ANC); Jonathan Mills (DA) (Ward 107)

Area
  - Total: 2.47 km^{2} (0.95 sq mi)

Population (2011)
  - Total: 14,476
  - Density: 5,860/km^{2} (15,200/sq mi)

Racial makeup (2011)
  - Black African: 30.7%
  - Coloured: 10.4%
  - Indian/Asian: 3.1%
  - White: 54.2%
  - Other: 1.6%

First languages (2011)
  - English: 56.7%
  - Afrikaans: 16.3%
  - Xhosa: 9.8%
  - Zulu: 1.8%
  - Other: 15.3%
- Time zone: UTC+2 (SAST)
- Postal code (street): 7441
- PO box: 2121

Parklands is a suburb of Cape Town, South Africa. It is located within the greater Blouberg area, bordered by Table View and is part of the Western Seaboard residential district.

Parklands is one of the fastest-growing residential developments in the Western Cape. It is characterised by lower-density suburban areas and higher-density apartment block areas; the latter are largely inhabited by African diaspora residents.
