= Richwood, Western Cape =

Richwood
- Location within Western Cape Location within South Africa
- Coordinates: 33.832°S 18.544°E
- Country: South Africa
- Province: Western Cape
- Municipality: City of Cape Town
- Main Place: Blouberg

Government
  - Type: Metro Ward 1
  - Councillor: Cheryl Visser (DA)

Area
  - Total: 0.77 km^{2} (0.30 sq mi)
- Elevation: 40 m (130 ft)

Population (2011)
  - Total: 2,988
  - Density: 3,900/km^{2} (10,000/sq mi)

Racial makeup (2011)
  - Black African: 11.0%
  - Coloured: 14.9%
  - Indian/Asian: 1.1%
  - White: 72.0%
  - Other: 0.9%

First languages (2011)
  - English: 72.0%
  - Afrikaans: 22.9%
  - Xhosa: 3.1%
  - Other: 2.0%
- Time zone: UTC+2 (SAST)
- Postal code (street): 7441

Richwood is a suburb of Cape Town, South Africa, situated in the city's Northern Suburbs region. The area is located around 15 kilometres (9.3 mi) north-east of Cape Town CBD, alongside the N7 freeway.

According to the 2011 census Richwood has a population of 2,988 individuals, residing a total of 963 households.

The suburb's name is a portmanteau of "Richmond Park" and "Goodwood".

== Transport ==
Richwood is located between the N7 highway and the M13 (Tygerberg Valley Road). The M13 connects Richwood to Durbanville and Bothasig and also provides access to the N7 highway (to Cape Town and Malmesbury) via the M14 and M12.
