= Bloubergstrand =

Seaside suburb of Cape Town on Table Bay, South Africa

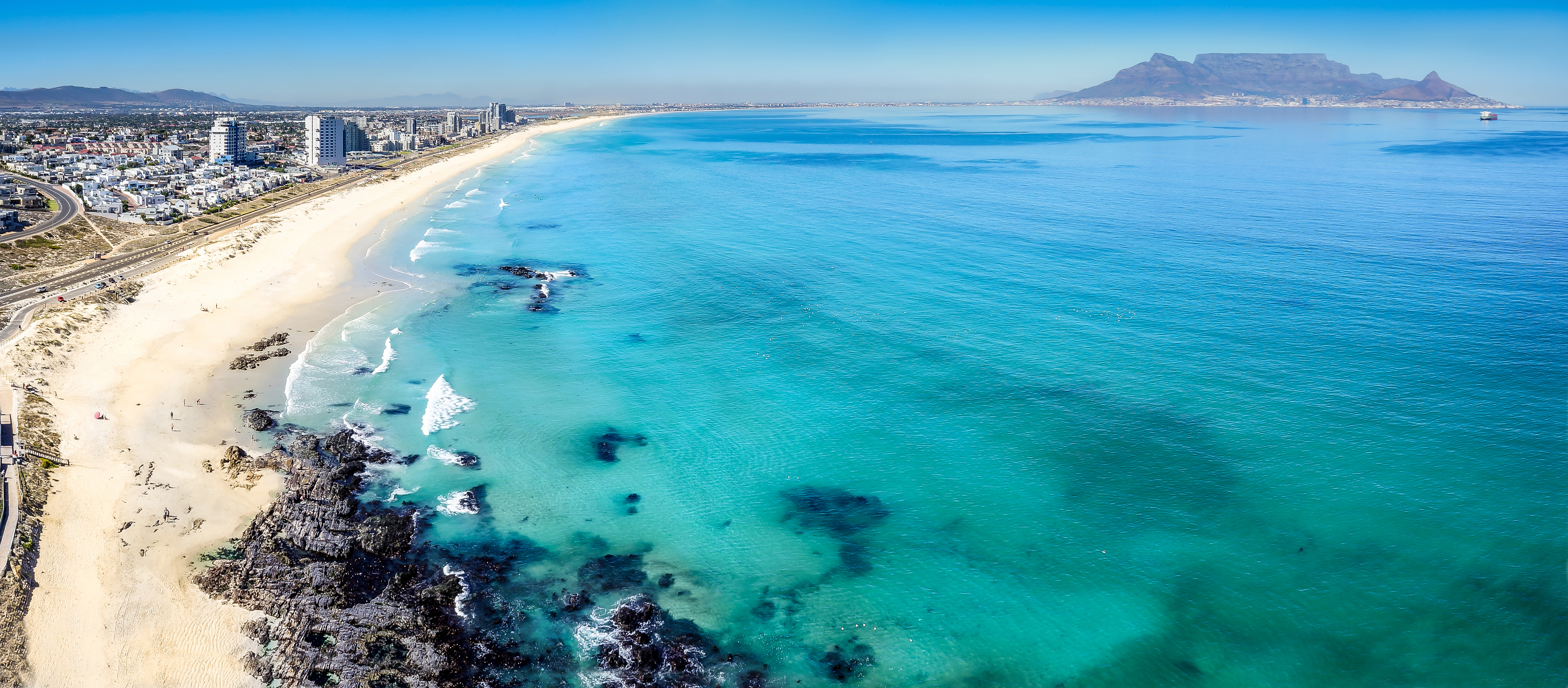
- An aerial view of Bloubergstrand with Table Mountain on the far side of Table Bay.
- Interactive map of Bloubergstrand
- Coordinates: 33.7972°S 18.4620°E
- Country: South Africa
- Province: Western Cape
- Municipality: City of Cape Town
- Main Place: Blouberg

Government
  - Councillor: Paul Swart (DA)

Area
  - Total: 1.39 km^{2} (0.54 sq mi)

Population (2011)
  - Total: 2,133
  - Density: 1,530/km^{2} (3,970/sq mi)

Racial makeup (2011)
  - Black African: 11%
  - Coloured: 4%
  - Indian/Asian: 1.9%
  - White: 80%
  - Other: 2.7%

First languages (2011)
  - English: 56.0%
  - Afrikaans: 33.2%
  - Xhosa: 2.3%
  - Zulu: 1.8%
  - Other: 6.8%
- Time zone: UTC+2 (SAST)
- Postal code (street): 7441
- PO box: 7436
- Area code: 021

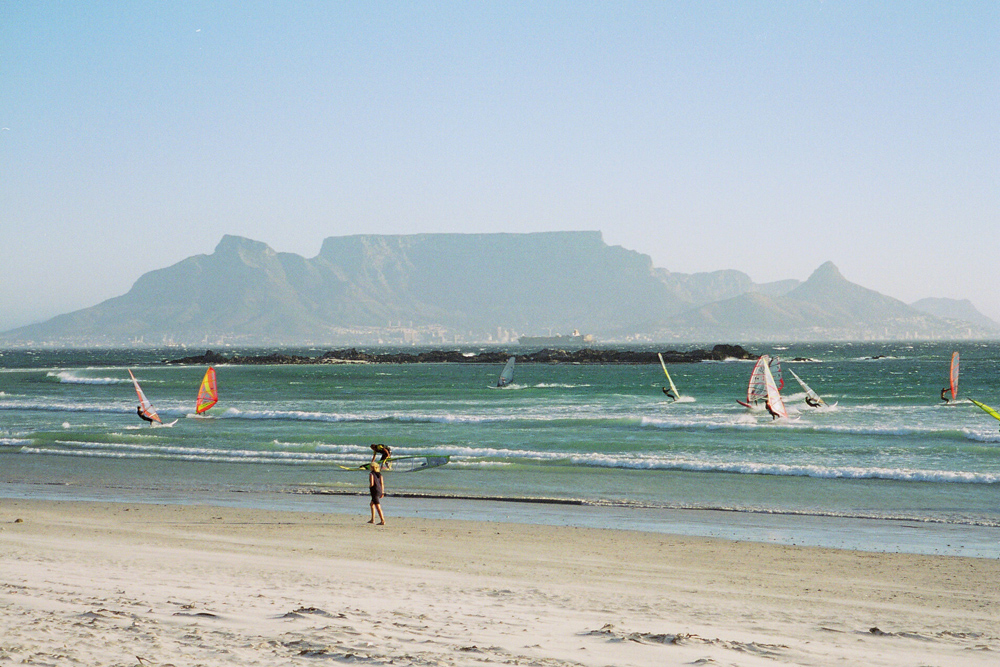
Recreation at Bloubergstrand, with Table Mountain in the background

Bloubergstrand /ˌbloʊbərɡˈstrænd/ is a seaside suburb of the City of Cape Town, South Africa, along the shores of Table Bay, 15 kilometres (9.3 mi) due north of the city centre of Cape Town. The name Bloubergstrand literally means "blue mountain beach" in Afrikaans, and is derived from Blaauwberg (231 metres (758 ft)), a nearby hill. Bloubergstrand is mainly a residential area, and attracts large numbers of visitors especially kitesurfing enthusiasts.

The beach at Bloubergstrand is a popular location for a classic view of Table Mountain across the bay and is one of the world's top kitesurf destinations. Robben Island is located 6.9 kilometres (4.3 mi) west of the coast of Bloubergstrand.

== History ==
"Harry die Strandloper", or Hadah, was the leader of the Goringhaikonas, who were the first people documented to live in Bloubergstrand. Hadah, whose original name was Autshumao, was taken to Java in 1629 by the captain of the ship London to be taught English. Because of his entrusted duties to deliver letters to the British seafaring community, he became the first postmaster in South Africa.

In 1806, the first casualties of the Battle of Blaauwberg drowned when their boat was driven by the large surf into the rocky point at the end of Stadler road and it capsized. The invading British forces went on to defeat the defending Dutch forces and subsequently occupied the whole of the Cape Colony. This was a major first step in the British colonisation that took place throughout the southern African continent.

Previously a National Monument, now a Provincial Heritage Site, "Ons Huisie" (literally translated to Our Small Home) has a long and colourful history in the development of Bloubergstrand. It was the first dwelling of Frederick Louis Stadler. (Hence Stadler Road is the original street). Shortly after the Battle of Blouberg in 1806, he became owner of almost all the farm property that is now known as Bloubergstrand. The exact building date is not known, but a Thomas Bowler made a beautiful pencil drawing of the house in 1853. Hendrik Louis Stadler, the sixth son of Frederick Louis, was the owner of "Ons Huisie" at that time. His sons, Frikkie, Rozier and Johannes, were some of the original founders of Bloubergstrand. The building is now a restaurant of some reputation.

From the 1940s a well-known writer of illustrated Afrikaans children's books, Helena 'Mollie' Lochner, lived at the end of Stadler Road in "Die Groot Withuis" or the Lochner House, on the southernmost tip of the promontory. Her ashes are buried under the front step of the house. When she died "Mollie Lochner Huis" was bequeathed to the South African Teachers' Union as a holiday home for female teachers but because of the high maintenance cost they had to dispose of it. Over the years it was changed beyond recognition, ultimately demolished in 2004 and a contemporary Westcoast styled guesthouse was developed.

The large wooden cross out on the promontory rocks was erected in memory of Heather Bam who lived in the same house before Mollie and who drowned off the point in 1911.

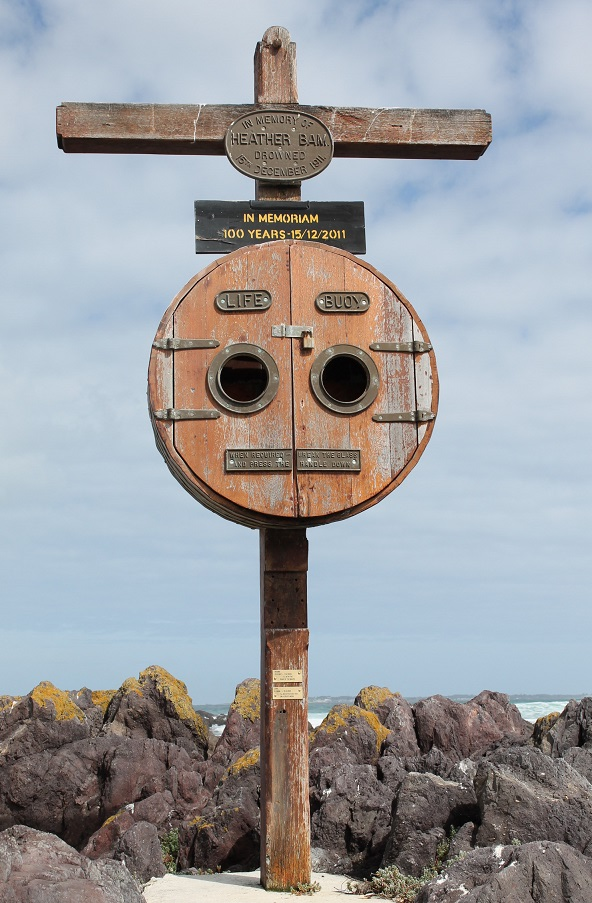
Heather Bam monument, Bloubergstrand

During Apartheid, Bloubergstrand was classified as a “whites-only” beach and suburb as part of the Group Areas Act. The ruling was repealed in 1991 following the abolition of the Group Areas Act. The imposing Blouberg Heights was built in the 1970s in response to a "white housing crisis" in racially segregated Cape Town. In the 1970s the National Party initiated several planning interventions, including the suspension of the city's zoning rules with regard to building height for developers willing to build housing in white Group Areas.

== Local traditions ==
The past continues in certain areas. Local licensed fishermen still use a small local design of rowing boat to put their nets out in Small Bay for mullet when the temperature and other conditions are favourable. They retrieve their nets manually, after which the fortunate locals buy this delicacy directly from them.

A traditional way of cooking the "harders" or mullets after cleaning them at the water's edge with the seabirds enjoying a free meal, is to make a wood fire, put much salt on the external skin and then to "braai" or grill to taste. The mullet has quite a few small bones and needs to be carefully digested together with freshly baked bread or pap from maize, enhanced with a regional traditional jam. Sometimes another local delicacy, "braaibrood", replaces the freshly baked bread. "Blouberg Braaibrood" consists of two slices of white, whole wheat or brown bread, on the outside, barbecued with onion, a chutney, tomato and cheese on the inside.

Street names in the Village of Bloubergstrand, since the early days, bear the names of well-known people i.e. General Sir David Baird, General Jansens, Commodore Sir Popham, General Ferguson and locals such as the family Stadler.

== Sea life ==
The Bloubergstrand area falls within a marine nature reserve and the extraction of species such as Cape rock lobster and abalone is prohibited. A licence is required in order to catch previously well-known local varieties of galjoen and Hottentot. Seafood is popular in the area, and includes the local white mussels. In season southern right whales, occasionally killer whales, humpback dolphins, Haviside's dolphin, and Cape fur seals are commonly seen in the bay. The great white shark is also known to live off the coast.

== The beach ==
Bloubergstrand has a long white sand beach on the Atlantic Ocean, with a few rocky outcrops where black mussels are found. The water is cold due to the Benguela current but the beach is popular with kitesurfers and windsurfers. The bay on the west side of Bloubergstrand, known as 'Big Bay' has become a very popular windsurfing and kitesurfing spot due to the constant trade winds bringing a 1–3 m surf for a majority of the year. Big Bay beach is also well known for the ease with which white mussels (a species of the genus Donax) can be extracted from the sand by a process locally known as 'jiving'.

== Notable people ==
- Petrus Kotzé, politician and former mayor of Cape Town was born in Bloubergstrant.

== See also ==
- History of Cape Colony from 1806 to 1870
- Blaauwberg House Self-catering Accommodation Bloubergstrand
