= Blouberg, Western Cape =

Blouberg
- Blaauwberg
- Location within Western Cape Location within South Africa Location within Africa
- Coordinates: 33°49′S 18°29′E
- Country: South Africa
- Province: Western Cape
- Municipality: City of Cape Town

Area
  - Total: 25.89 km^{2} (10.00 sq mi)

Population (2011)
  - Total: 106,222
  - Density: 4,103/km^{2} (10,630/sq mi)

Racial makeup (2011)
  - Black African: 44.4%
  - Coloured: 6.5%
  - Indian/Asian: 1.9%
  - White: 44.7%
  - Other: 2.5%

First languages (2011)
  - English: 43.7%
  - Xhosa: 27.5%
  - Afrikaans: 14.7%
  - Other: 14.1%
- Time zone: UTC+2 (SAST)
- Area code: 021

Blouberg (Blaauwberg in Afrikaans), is a group of suburbs north of Cape Town, in the Western Cape, South Africa. Situated along the Table Bay, the area has a mix of residential, commercial, and industrial zoning.

Organisationally and administratively, it forms part of the Blaauwberg planning region of the City of Cape Town Metropolitan Municipality, which extends beyond Blouberg itself to include Milnerton, Melkbosstrand, Atlantis and Mamre.

== Geography ==
=== Location ===
Situated on the West Coast, the geographical position of Blouberg is between the Blaauwberg Nature Reserve to the north and Milnerton to the south. Due to most of the area having been developed around Table View, Blouberg is also known as the Greater Table View area and many of the suburbs are considered as extensions of Table View.

=== Suburbs ===
According to the 2011 census, the main place of Blouberg was divided into the following sub-places:

- Big Bay
- Blouberg Rise
- Blouberg Sands
- Bloubergrant
- Bloubergstrand
- Doornbach
- Du Noon
- Du Noon School Site Informal
- Flamingo Vlei
- Killarney
- Killarney Gardens
- Milnerton Industrial
- Parklands
- Parklands Ext.
- Richwood
- Rosendal
- Sunningdale
- Sunridge
- Table View
- West Beach
- West Riding

== Retail ==
Blouberg includes a host of several shopping malls with the largest of these being the established Bayside Mall in Table View and the newer Table Bay Mall in Sandown.

Smaller shopping centres include:

- Ashwood Centre, Parklands
- Emporium Shopping Centre, Sandown
- Flamingo Square, Table View
- Parklands Mall, Parklands
- Parklands Lifestyle Centre, Parklands
- Sandown Retail Crossing, Sandown
- Seaside Village Shopping Centre, Big Bay
- Table View Shopping Centre, Table View
- The Stables Shopping Centre, Du Noon
- West Coast Village Shopping Centre, Sunningdale

== Growth ==
The location of Blouberg, just under 20 minutes from Cape Town and its self-sufficiency from the city made the area a convenient place to purchase residential property and as a result, a lot of residential development has been constructed in recent years or is still under construction here. The area north of Blouberg has rapidly expanded with new extensions such as Sunningdale, Sandown and Parklands North, which mostly comprise complexes and townhouses while the northern extension of Rivergate is a new mixed-use development north of Sandown Road and just off the N7 highway.

== Healthcare ==
=== Private healthcare ===
Netcare Blaauwberg Hospital is the sole hospital serving Blouberg. Owned by Netcare Limited, it is a private hospital operating 24-hour emergency services. The hospital is located between West Coast Road and Waterville Street, just north of West Coast Village in Sunningdale.

=== Public healthcare ===
Table View Clinic is a government-funded municipal clinic operated by the City of Cape Town, catering to residents' healthcare needs within the Blaauwberg Health region.

== Transport ==
=== Roads ===
Blouberg is mainly reached via the R27 (West Coast Road), a major regional route connecting Milnerton and Cape Town to the south with Melkbosstrand and Velddrif to the north. The suburb can also be reached from Cape Town and Malmesbury via the N7 through the M12 Interchange in Du Noon and the M14 Interchange in Milnerton, from Milnerton and Muizenberg via the M5, from Burgundy Estate and Parow via the M12 and from Parow and Melkbosstrand via the M14.

== See also ==
- List of Cape Town suburbs
