= Paarden Eiland =

Light industrial area in Cape Town, South Africa

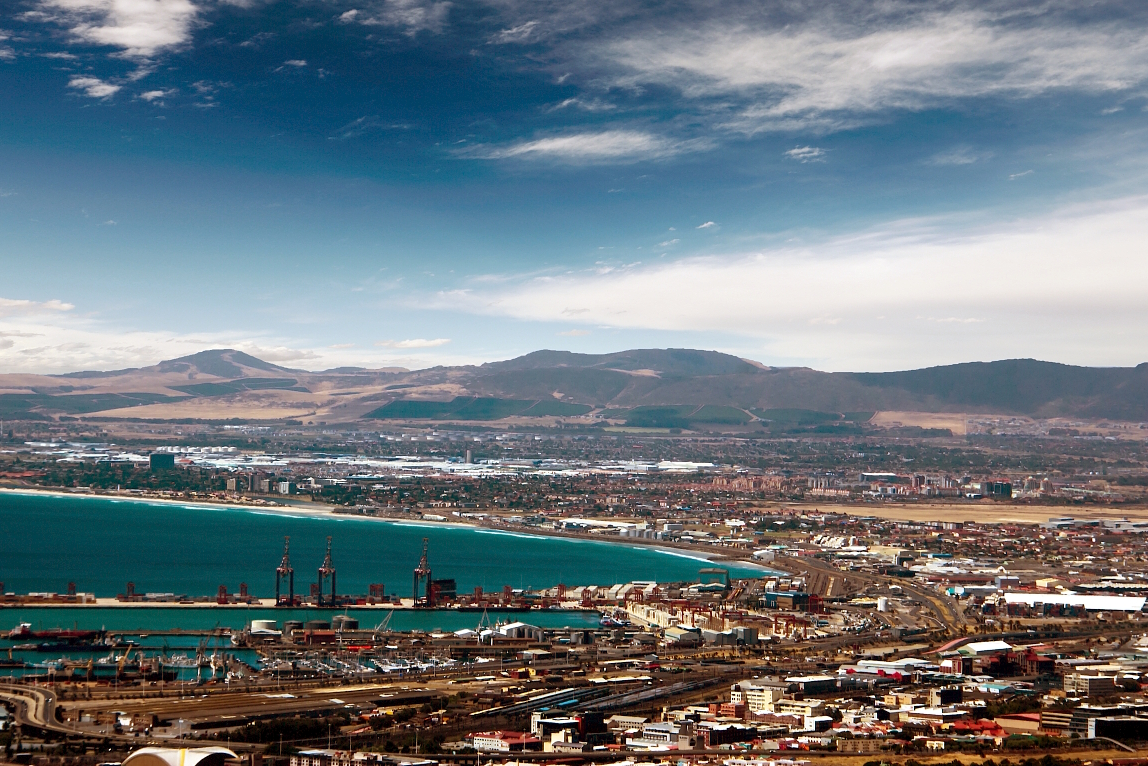
- Paarden Eiland (right), on the shore of Table Bay
- Interactive map of Paarden Eiland
- Coordinates: 33.91522°S 18.47035°E
- Country: South Africa
- Province: Western Cape
- Municipality: City of Cape Town
- Main Place: Cape Town

Government
  - Councilor: Fabian Ah-Sing (Democratic Alliance)
- Time zone: SAST
- Postal code: 7405
- Area code: 021

Paarden Eiland (lit. island of horses) is a light industrial area in Cape Town, South Africa. It is located in the city's Blouberg region, along the Table Bay coast. The suburb is bordered by multiple other suburbs containing light industry.

== History ==
The area which is now Paarden Eiland is located at the mouth of the Salt River and Black River and was originally inhabited by the indigenous ǃUriǁʼaekua people ("Goringhaiqua" in Dutch approximate spelling). It was the approximate location of the Battle of Salt River in 1510, the first military encounter between Europeans and indigenous people in what would later become South Africa.

Jan van Riebeeck referred to game hunting game in the area, and the rivers were inhabited by hippopotamus.

In 1773, the Dutch ship De Jonge Thomas dragged anchor and sank on a sandbank in the area, and event made famous by the heroic rescue of 14 sailors by Wolraad Woltemade, who drowned along with his horse in the rescue.

Paarden Eiland was declared an industrial area in 1935 and was heavily developed after World War II. Some of its industry later moved to the areas of Epping, and subsequently Bellville, when they were developed.

Over the years, industries active in Paarden Eiland have included warehousing, automotive, textile, bottling, ice cream manufacturing, baking, and retail.

In May 2005, subsequent to an application to the City by Paarden Eiland property owners, the Paarden Eiland City Improvement District (PECID) was established.

In September 2024, the City of Cape Town confirmed plans to build a desalination plant in Paarden Eiland. The project is expected to produce between 50 and 70 million liters of water a day by 2030. At the time, an environmental impact assessment was underway. The City's MMC for Water and Sanitation Zahid Badroodien said the Paarden Eiland Desalination Plant would advance Cape Town's water security, as part of its New Water Program infrastructure project.

== Geography ==
Paarden Eiland is located in the Blouberg region of the City of Cape Town metro area, along the Table Bay shoreline, with the bay to its north. The suburb is bordered by the Port of Cape Town in the Foreshore to the west. To the south, it is bordered by the mixed-use (including light industrial) suburbs of Woodstock and Salt River.

To the east is the Koeberg Interchange, within the suburb of Maitland, and to the northeast are the residential suburbs of Brooklyn and Rugby.

Paarden Eiland is situated approximately 6 kilometers from Cape Town CBD, 15 km from Cape Town International Airport, and 6 km from mixed-use Century City.

== Transit ==
The Atlantis - Table View - Civic Centre MyCiTi bus rapid transit route runs through Paarden Eiland. The area is home to five of the network's stations, namely (from west to east) Paarden Eiland, Neptune, Section, Vrystaat, and Zoarvlei. The network links Paarden Eiland to Lagoon Beach to the east, and Woodstock to the west.

== Governance ==
Paarden Eiland falls within the local government's Ward 55, which itself is part of Subcouncil 3. As of 2026, the suburb is represented by Councilor Fabian Ah-Sing of the Democratic Alliance.
