= Westland Wasp =

Anti-submarine helicopter, British, 1962-2000

Wasp
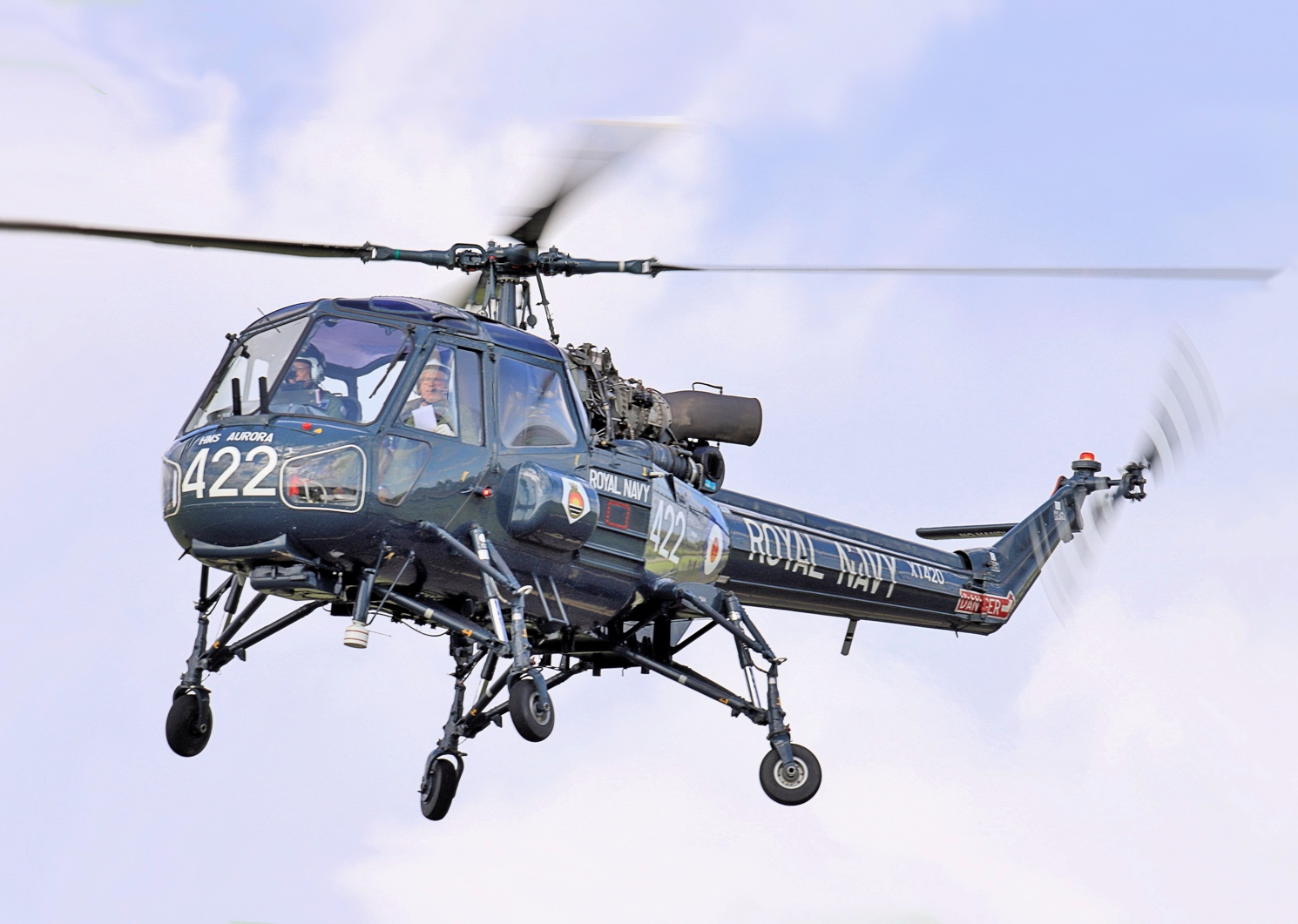
- A Westland Wasp HAS.1 in Royal Navy markings

General information
- Type: Helicopter
- National origin: United Kingdom
- Manufacturer: Westland Helicopters
- Primary users: Royal Navy Royal New Zealand Navy; Royal Netherlands Navy; Royal Malaysian Navy
- Number built: 133

History
- Introduction date: 1963
- First flight: 28 October 1962
- Retired: 2000 (Royal Malaysian Navy)
- Developed from: Saro P.531

The Westland Wasp is a small 1960s British turbine-powered, shipboard anti-submarine helicopter. Produced by Westland Helicopters, it came from the same Saunders-Roe P.531 programme as the British Army Westland Scout, and is based on the earlier piston-engined Saunders-Roe Skeeter. It fulfilled the requirement of the Royal Navy for a helicopter small enough to land on the deck of a frigate and carry a useful load of two homing torpedoes.

== Design and development ==
The increasing speed and attack range of the submarine threat, and the increased range at which this threat could be detected, led to a Royal Navy requirement for a "Manned Torpedo-Carrying Helicopter" (MATCH). Contemporary shipboard weapons did not have the necessary range, therefore MATCH was in essence a stand-off weapon with the helicopter carrying the torpedo or other weapon to the target and being instructed when and where to drop it. Unlike the larger Westland Wessex, the Wasp carried no sonar of its own, and was limited strictly to working in partnership with its parent ship, other ships or other anti-submarine warfare (ASW) units.

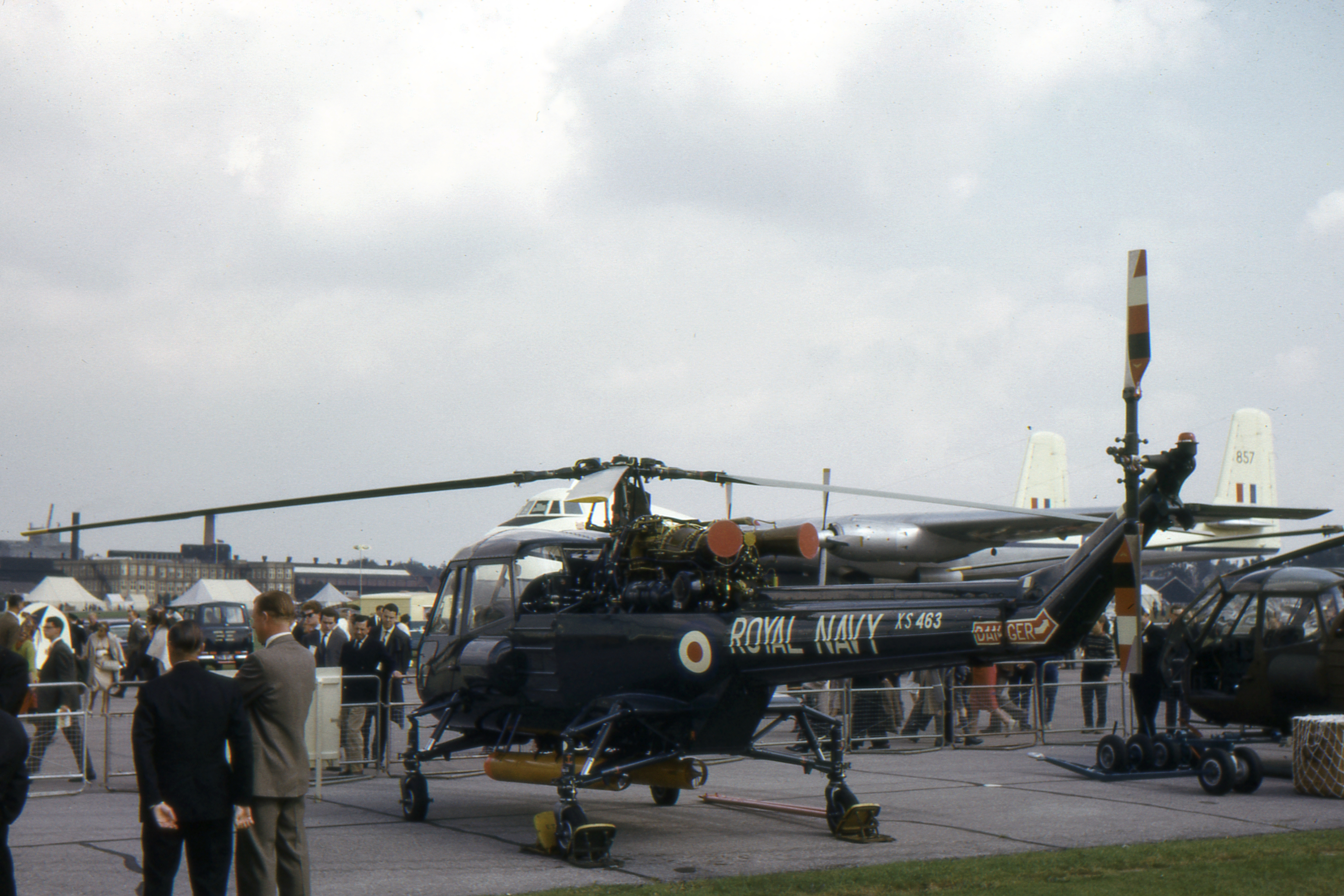
First Wasp at the SBAC show 1962, a month before the first flight

The first prototype Saro P.531 flew on 20 July 1958, with the prototypes being subject to detailed testing by the Royal Navy, including the evaluation of several undercarriage layouts, before settling on the definitive arrangement. An order for a pre-production batch of two "Sea Scouts" was placed in September 1961. The first flight of the two pre-production Wasp took place on 28 October 1962. Full production soon commenced, 98 in total being procured for the RN. The Wasp was successfully exported to Brazil, the Netherlands, Indonesia, Malaysia, New Zealand and South Africa. 133 aircraft were built in total.

Wasp was essentially a navalised Scout, indeed it was originally to be called the Sea Scout, and differed mainly in design details. It had a unique 4-wheeled castering undercarriage that allowed the aircraft to be manoeuvred on small, pitching flightdecks. The Wasp could use "negative pitch" from the rotor-blades to enable the aircraft to "adhere" to the deck until the lashings were attached. Additional fuel tankage was installed in the cabin floor, and both the tail boom and main rotor blades were foldable to allow stowage in the small hangars fitted to the first generation helicopter-carrying escorts. It was fitted with a winch above the starboard rear door, and also had the capacity to carry underslung loads from the semi-automatic cargo release unit mounted under the fuselage. With a crew of two (Pilot and Missile Aimer/Aircrewman) and the capacity to seat three passengers, Wasp was useful for short-range transport missions, and for casualty evacuation with room for one stretcher fitted across the rear cabin area.

Later modifications included the ability to carry the Nord SS.11 wire-guided missile, with the fitting of the Aimer's sight in the left cockpit roof, and the installation of large inflatable emergency floats in sponsons on either side of the cabin to prevent capsizing of the top-heavy aircraft in the event of ditching. The SS.11 had limited range, targeting small surface targets such as patrol boats or shore positions, and was later replaced by the AS.12, which effectively had double the range.

== Operational history ==
=== Royal Navy ===
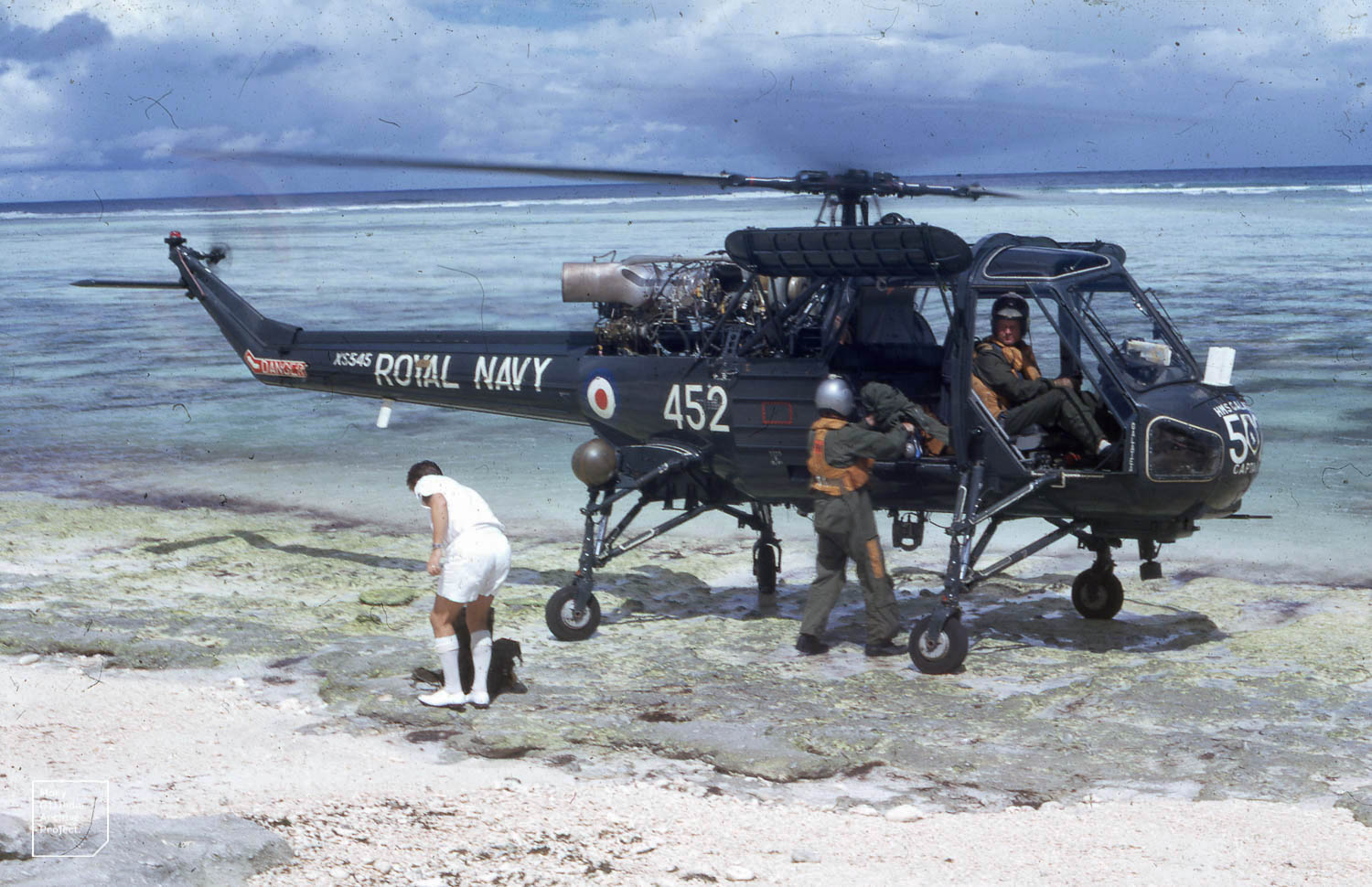
Wasp from HMS Galatea landing personnel on Aldabra atoll, Indian Ocean (1970)

The Wasp HAS.1 was introduced to service in the small ships role in 1964, after an intensive period of trials by 700(W) Intensive Flying Trials Unit between June 1963 and March 1964. It served in this primary role with 829 Naval Air Squadron, but also in training units to supply crews for the front line with 706 NAS between 1965 and 1967 and in 703 NAS between 1972 and 1981. Single airframes also served for light liaison duties in the Commando Assault squadrons, 845 NAS and 848 NAS, until 1973. Although effective as a submarine killer, it was best deployed paired with a Wessex HAS.3 submarine hunter. In the late 1970s, the Westland Lynx started to replace the Wasp.

On 25 April 1982 the Argentinian submarine ARA Santa Fe was spotted by a Wessex helicopter from HMS Antrim. The Wessex and a Lynx HAS.2 from HMS Brilliant then attacked it with depth charges, a Mk 46 torpedo, and also strafed it with General Purpose Machine Gun. A Wasp launched from HMS Plymouth and two Wasps launched from HMS Endurance fired AS.12 anti-ship missiles at the submarine, scoring hits. Santa Fe was damaged badly enough to prevent her from submerging. The crew abandoned the submarine at the jetty on South Georgia and surrendered to the British forces, thus becoming the first casualty of the sea war, as well as the first direct engagement by the Royal Navy Task Force.

The last Wasp was withdrawn from service in 1988 when the last of the Type 12 Rothesay-class frigates was decommissioned.

=== Royal Malaysian Navy ===
The Wasp came into service with the Royal Malaysian Navy quite late, compared to the other nations who procured the aircraft when it joined the RMN on 8 April 1988. The Wasp had a relatively short career and was phased out ten years later, replaced by the Eurocopter Fennec.

=== Royal New Zealand Navy ===
The first four of an eventual nineteen Wasps were purchased by the Royal New Zealand Navy (RNZN) in 1966, being immediately assigned to the new Leander-class frigate, HMNZS Waikato. They fulfilled numerous tasks, as well as taking part in the Armilla Patrol in the Persian Gulf during the 1980s. The Wasps were normally flown by RNZN pilots but maintained by ground crews of No. 3 Squadron RNZAF, however during shortages of RNZH pilots, RN exchange pilots, RAN pilots and RNZAF pilots were utilised].

In 1997, four Wasps performed a flypast marking the arrival of the new Anzac-class frigate, HMNZS Te Kaha.

The Wasp served 32 years with the RNZN, retiring in 1998, the same year HMNZS Waikato, which first operationally deployed the Wasp in New Zealand, was herself decommissioned. They were replaced by the Kaman SH-2 Seasprite as a stopgap until the arrival of their SH-2G(NZ).

=== Royal Netherlands Navy ===
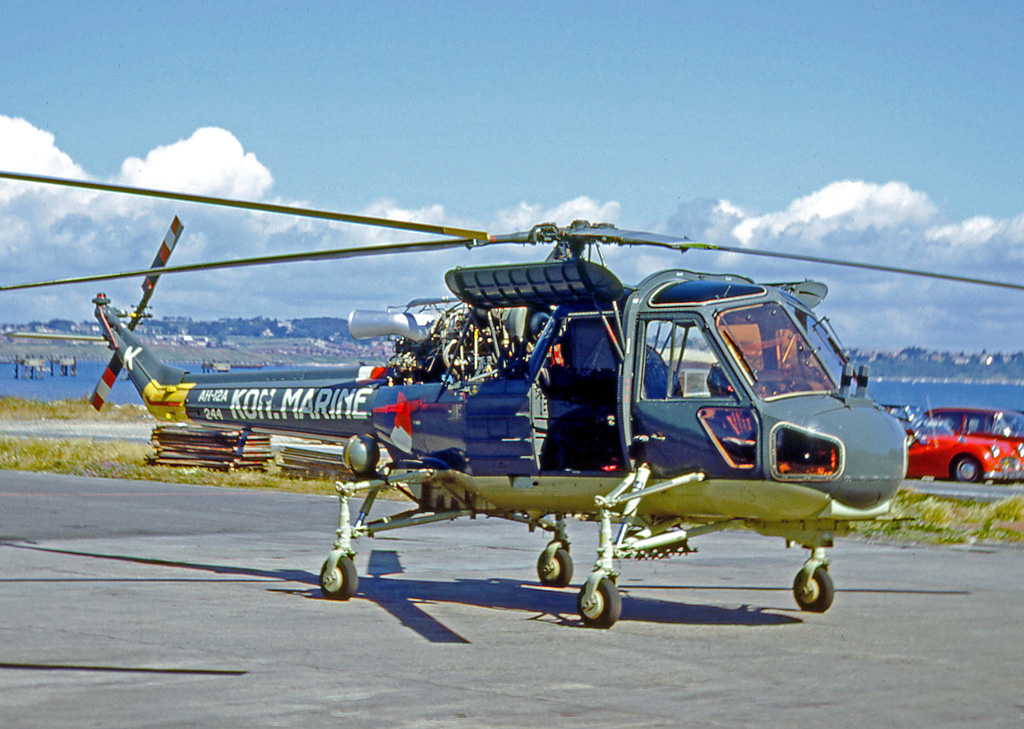
Wasp HAS.1 (AH-12A) of the Dutch Koninklijke Marine, 1967

With the Royal Netherlands Navy beginning in the late 1960s, after the fire onboard HNLMS Karel Doorman, NATO anti-submarine commitments were taken over by a squadron of Westland Wasp helicopters, operated from six Van Speijk-class anti-submarine frigates. The shore base was at De Kooy Airfield. The Royal Netherlands Navy 860 Naval Air Squadron received 12 Wasp helicopters between November 1966 and June 1967, operated from Van Speijk-class frigates as AH-12As and flown in the ASW role. The last of the Dutch Wasps were withdrawn from service in 1981 when they were replaced by the Westland Lynx.

=== Other operators ===
The Wasp was also in service with the Brazilian, Indonesian, and South African navies. The Indonesian aircraft were all former Dutch aircraft and the last of the type in active service.

The last of the ten surplus Dutch Navy helicopters refurbished by Westland for the Indonesian Navy was grounded in 1998. Flown by 400th Air Squadron (RON 400) from NAS Juanda, when at sea they were embarked upon the Indonesian Navy's ex-Royal Navy Tribal-class and ex-Dutch Navy Van Speijk class frigates.

The Brazilian Navy operated the Wasp as the UH-2 & UH-2A, taking delivery of three new build helicopters in April 1966 and a further seven ex-Royal Navy helicopters in 1977. 1º Esquadrão de Helicópteros de Emprego Geral (HU-1) flew the helicopters from Navy's Gearing and Allen M. Sumner-class destroyers and the Niterói-class frigates.

The South African Navy received their first batch of ten new-build airframes in 1963, followed by the delivery of a second batch of eight from 1973. Only six of this batch were delivered due to the international arms embargo placed on South Africa during the Apartheid regime. The Wasps were flown by 22 Flight from Ysterplaat; the unit became 22 Squadron, Maritime Command in 1976. The helicopters were operated from the navy's President-class frigates. The South African Navy also acquired one ex-Bahrain Public Security Force airframe as an instructional airframe to support its Wasp programme. The South African Navy withdrew their last Wasp in 1990.

== Variants ==
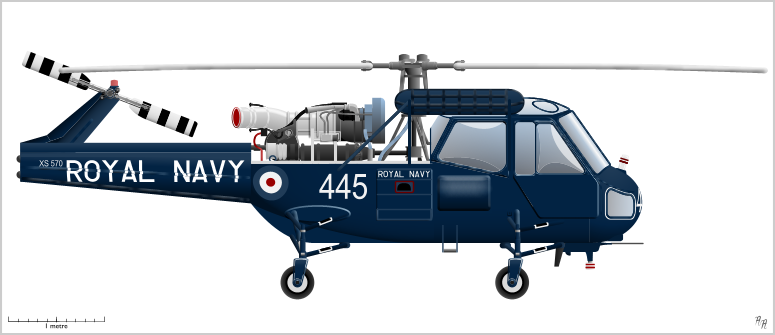
Westland Wasp HAS.1

Sea Scout HAS.1
The Sea Scout HAS.1 was the original Royal Navy designation for the Wasp.
Wasp HAS.1
Shipboard anti-submarine warfare helicopter for the Royal Navy.
UH-2/UH-2A
Brazilian Navy designations of the Wasp. The UH-2 was originally designated SH-2.

== Operators ==
Brazil

- Brazilian Navy

Indonesia

- Indonesian Navy

Malaysia

- Royal Malaysian Navy

Netherlands

- Royal Netherlands Navy

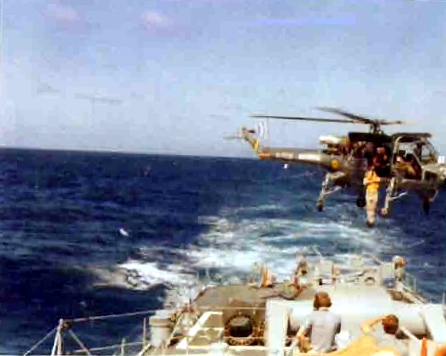
A Brazilian Wasp hovering over USS Mahan, in 1977.

New Zealand

- Royal New Zealand Navy

South Africa

- South African Navy

United Kingdom

- Royal Navy
- 700W Naval Air Squadron
- 703 Naval Air Squadron
- 705 Naval Air Squadron
- 706 Naval Air Squadron
- 771 Naval Air Squadron
- 829 Naval Air Squadron
- 845 Naval Air Squadron
- 848 Naval Air Squadron
- 860 Naval Air Squadron

== Aircraft on display ==
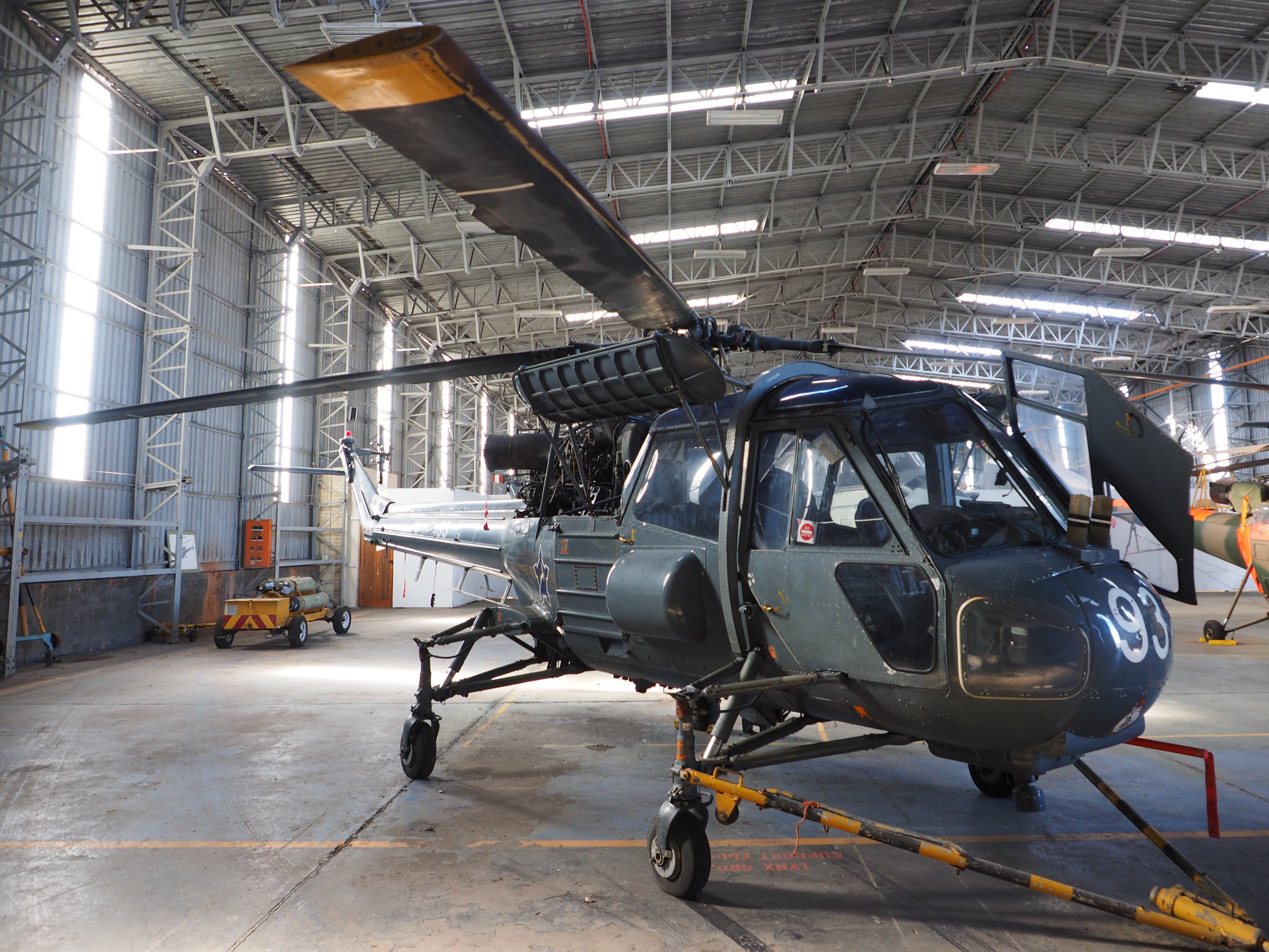
A former SAAF Wasp HAS.1 on display at the Ysterplaat branch of the South African Air Force Museum

- Brazil
  - Wasp HAS.1 N-7039, which was XT433 in the Royal Navy from 1965 to 1978, is on display at Campo Dos Afonsos.
- Germany
  - Wasp HAS.1 (XS569) is on display at the Flugaustellung L&P Junior, Hermeskeil.
- Indonesia
  - Wasp HAS.1 HS-434 of the Indonesian Navy, former "Marineluchtvaartdienst" 243, is on display as gate guardian at Juanda Naval Air Station in Surabaya.
  - Wasp HAS.1 of the Indonesian Navy is on display at Naval Doctrine, Education and Training Development Command in Surabaya.
- Malaysia
  - Wasp HAS.1 M499-01, which was XV636 in the Royal Navy, is on display at the Royal Pahang Museum, Pekan, Malaysia.
  - Wasp HAS.1 M499-07, which was XT426 in the Royal Navy from 1965 to 1992, is on display at the Maritime Museum, Malacca, Malaysia.
- New Zealand
  - Wasp HAS.1 NZ3906 is on display at the Royal New Zealand Air Force Museum in Christchurch.
- Netherlands
  - AH-12A Wasp 235 of the "Marineluchtvaartdienst" (MLD), former Royal Navy Wasp HAS.1 XT795, is on display at the Traditiekamer Marineluchtvaartdienst at De Kooy.
- South Africa
  - Wasp HAS.1 85 is on display at the South African Naval Museum
  - Wasp HAS.1 93 is on display at the AFB Ysterplaat branch of the South African Air Force Museum
- United Kingdom: airworthy
  - G-BYCX a former South African Wasp Mk 1B is owned by Military Vehicle Solutions Ltd. in Dunchurch, Rugby.
  - G-CBUI a former Royal Navy (XT420) Wasp HAS.1 is owned by the Fly Navy Heritage Trust at RNAS Yeovilton and flies in Royal Navy markings as XT420.
  - G-CGGK a former 829 NAS Wasp HAS.1 (was RN serial number XT434) is owned by Aeromedical Training Ltd. in Wiltshire.
  - G-CMBE (previously registered as G-KANZ) a former Royal Navy (XT782) and former RNZN (NZ3909) Wasp HAS.1 is privately owned and flies in RNZN markings as NZ3909.
  - G-KAXT a former Royal Navy (XT787) and Royal New Zealand Navy (NZ3905) Wasp HAS.1 is privately owned in Hampshire and, as a frequent visitor to airshows, is flown in Royal Navy south Atlantic camouflage scheme wearing the badge of HMS Endurance and its original tail number of XT787.
  - G-RIMM a former Royal Navy (XT435) and RNZN (NZ3907) Wasp HAS.1 is privately owned and flies marked as XT435.
- United Kingdom: on display
  - Wasp HAS.1 XS527 is on display at Fleet Air Arm Museum, Yeovilton.
  - Former Endurance Flight Wasp HAS.1 XS567 is on display at the Imperial War Museum Duxford.
  - Wasp HAS.1 XT431 is on display at the Bournemouth Aviation Museum, Dorset.
  - Wasp HAS.1 XT443 is on display at The Helicopter Museum, Weston-super-Mare.
  - Wasp HAS.1 XT788 is based in Devon, England but is displayed at various locations around the United Kingdom as a focal point for charity collection.
- United Kingdom: stored or under restoration
  - G-BZPP a Wasp HAS.1 (was RN serial number XT793)
  - Wasp HAS.1s XT427 and XT778 are held in storage by the Fleet Air Arm Museum, Yeovilton.
  - Former 829 NAS Wasp HAS.1 XT439 is privately owned in Hertfordshire.
  - Wasp HAS.1 XT437 is held by the Boscombe Down Aviation Collection at Old Sarum Airfield, Wiltshire.

A small number of helicopters are still used by the military and technical colleges for maintenance and engineering training.

== Specifications (Wasp HAS.1) ==

Data from Westland Aircraft since 1915

General characteristics

- Crew: 1 pilot, 1 Aircrewman
- Capacity: up to 4 passengers
- Length: 40 ft 4 in (12.29 m) overall, 30 ft 4 in (9.24 m) fuselage only
- Height: 8 ft 11 in (2.72 m)
- Empty weight: 3,452 lb (1,566 kg)
- Max takeoff weight: 5,500 lb (2,495 kg)
- Powerplant: 1 × Rolls-Royce Nimbus 103 turboshaft engine, 710 shp (530 kW) de-rated from 1,050 shp (783 kW)
- Main rotor diameter: 32 ft 3 in (9.83 m)
- Main rotor area: 816.9 sq ft (75.89 m^{2})

Performance

- Maximum speed: 104 kn (120 mph, 193 km/h)
- Cruise speed: 96 kn (110 mph, 178 km/h)
- Range: 263 nmi (303 mi, 487 km)
- Service ceiling: 12,200 ft (3,700 m)
- Rate of climb: 1,440 ft/min (7.3 m/s)
- Disk loading: 6.75 lb/sq ft (33.0 kg/m^{2})
- Power/mass: 0.19 hp/lb (0.31 kW/kg)

Armament

- 2 × Mk 44 or 1 × Mk 46 torpedo or 2 × Mk 11 depth charges or WE.177 600lb Nuclear Depth Bomb.
- 4 × SS.11 or 2 × AS.12 missiles.
- L7 GPMG, 4.5 Flares, Smoke/flame floats.

== See also ==
Related development

- Saunders-Roe Skeeter
- Saunders-Roe P.531
- Westland Scout

Aircraft of comparable role, configuration, and era

- Aérospatiale Alouette II
- Aérospatiale Alouette III
- Kamov Ka-15
