= Salt River, Cape Town =

Salt River
- Interactive map of Salt River
- Coordinates: 33°55′58″S 18°27′27″E
- Country: South Africa
- Province: Western Cape
- Municipality: City of Cape Town
- Main Place: Cape Town

Government
  - Councillor: Bernadette Le Roux (DA)

Area
  - Total: 2.75 km^{2} (1.06 sq mi)

Population (2011)
  - Total: 6,577
  - Density: 2,390/km^{2} (6,190/sq mi)

Racial makeup (2011)
  - Black African: 39.5%
  - Coloured: 45.0%
  - Indian/Asian: 3.8%
  - White: 6.6%
  - Other: 5.1%

First languages (2011)
  - English: 56.5%
  - Afrikaans: 15.9%
  - Xhosa: 10.1%
  - Zulu: 1.8%
  - Other: 15.7%
- Time zone: UTC+2 (SAST)
- Postal code (street): 7925

Salt River is a suburb of Cape Town, located near Table Bay, to the east of Cape Town CBD.

The area is noted for its association with the clothing and textiles industry. The name Salt River is a translation of the Dutch "Soutrivier".

== History ==
Prior to its establishment as a suburb within Cape Town, the area was inhabited by the Goringhaiqua Khoikhoi clan. In 1510 it was the scene of the Battle of Salt River between the Portuguese and the Goringhaiqua.

Once a booming part of Cape Town because of its close proximity to the CBD, Salt River was the industrial heart of Cape Town. The steel and locomotive industries were important in the suburb's early development due to the expansion of the rail network in the early 1900s.

Up until the late 1980s, prominent industries also included textile and clothing manufacturing. However, due to the influx of cheaper, imported clothing many of the clothing factories closed and are being redeveloped.

Due to Salt River's proximity to Cape Town CBD and large manufacturing plants, the suburb became popular with Cape Malays and the so-called coloured working class. Many Cape Malay and coloured people moved to Salt River from District Six in the late 1950s and early 1960s, even before the "forced removals" from District Six, which took place around 1967.

Cape Malays and coloureds could buy houses in Salt River, but Indians could not. However, Indians were allowed to live in Salt River provided they buy or rent a house attached to a corner grocer shop.

Over the following decades, many businesses in the area closed, while unemployment and crime increased. A rise in gangs and drug use in the suburb in the mid-1990s led to the formation of the militant group PAGAD.

In 2010, Salt River was pegged for revival as part of a R20 billion urban renewal initiative across Cape Town.

In recent years, the suburb has undergone gentrification, and property prices have increased. As of January 2026, the average price of a 2-bedroom condo in Salt River was R2.33 million.

== Geography ==
Salt River is named after a river of the same name. The Salt River is formed by the confluence of the Liesbeek and Black Rivers. The river has been canalised and flows into Table Bay between Paarden Eiland and Brooklyn.

Salt River is situated around 4km from Cape Town CBD, 8km from Sea Point, 8km from Century City, and 14km from Cape Town International Airport. It is surrounded by other mixed-use areas; namely Woodstock, Observatory, Foreshore, Paarden Eiland, Maitland, and Ndabeni.

== Composition ==
Salt River is a mixed-use area, comprising retail, commercial, light industrial, and residential properties. More than half the suburb's area (the part to the north-east) is taken up by rail, automotive, and warehousing-related lots.

In terms of homes, the suburb contains mostly low-rise and mid-rise condos, but does feature some detached houses as well.

== Notable locations ==
- Community House, a site of historical civic activism that houses numerous NGOs and trade unions
