= Rugby, Cape Town =

Suburb of Cape Town, in Western Cape, South Africa

Rugby
- Interactive map of Rugby
- Coordinates: 33°54′00″S 18°29′00″E
- Country: South Africa
- Province: Western Cape
- Municipality: City of Cape Town

Government
  - Councillor: Fabian Ah-Sing (DA)

Area
  - Total: 1.12 km^{2} (0.43 sq mi)

Population (2011)
  - Total: 4,042
  - Density: 3,610/km^{2} (9,350/sq mi)

Racial makeup (2011)
  - Black African: 24.2%
  - Coloured: 34.3%
  - Indian/Asian: 1.4%
  - White: 36.2%
  - Other: 3.9%

First languages (2011)
  - English: 60.5%
  - Afrikaans: 20.6%
  - isiXhosa: 6.0%
  - isiZulu: 1.6%
  - Other: 11.3%
- Time zone: UTC+2 (SAST)
- Postal code (street): 7405
- Area code: 021

Rugby is a residential suburb in the Milnerton area outside Cape Town, Western Cape, South Africa. According to the 2011 census, it has a population of 4,042 residents with 1,297 households. The suburb is bordered by Ysterplaat, Brooklyn, Tijgerhof and Paarden Eiland. Lagoon Beach lies to the west of Rugby.
