= Elsieskraal River =

River in Cape Town, South Africa

Elsieskraal River Elsieskraalrivier
- Location in South Africa
- Etymology: From Elsie, an Afrikaans name and kraal

Location
- Country: South Africa
- Province: Western Cape Province

Physical characteristics
- Source: Tygerberg Nature Reserve
  - location: Tygerberg Hills, City of Cape Town, Western Cape, South Africa
- Length: 6.9 km (4.3 mi)

The Elsieskraal River (Afrikaans Elsieskraalrivier) is a small river that flows through the Cape Town metropolitan area, in South Africa. It rises in the Tygerberg Hills and flows in a generally south westerly direction to its confluence with the Black River just south of Pinelands. 65% of the course of the Elsieskraal River has been canalised to prevent flooding. Its catchment is part of the Central Management Area of the City of Cape Town. As most of the catchment area is urbanised and the river receives rapid runoff from roads, roofs and other impermeable surfaces it is prone to rapid increases in discharge after rain.

== See also ==
- Salt River (Western Cape)
- Liesbeeck River
- Black River (Cape Town)
- List of rivers of South Africa
- List of estuaries of South Africa
