= 110 Squadron SAAF =

110 Squadron
- Country: South Africa
- Branch: South African Air Force
- Role: Reconnaissance and crime prevention
- Garrison/HQ: AFB Ysterplaat

110 Squadron is a territorial reserve squadron of the South African Air Force. The squadron operations include VIP transport, coastal reconnaissance flights, command and control in crime prevention operations in conjunction with the South African Police and South African Army. The squadron is based at AFB Ysterplaat.
