= Coenraad de Buys =

South African "remarkable figure"

- Born: Coenraad De Buys; 1761; Wagenboomrivier, Montagu
- Died: 1821 (aged 59–60); Zoutpansberg
- Other names: Coenraad Buys "Moro" "Kgowe"
- Height: 7 ft (213 cm)
- Spouse: Elizabeth Van de Kaap (m. 1812–1820)
- Partner(s): Multiple native women, including Maria Van der Horst
- Children: allegedly 315
- Parent(s): Jan du Buys (father); Christina Scheepers (mother)

Coenraad De Buys (1761 – 1821) was described as "a remarkable figure" on the frontier of the Cape Colony. Travellers described him with awe. Their accounts mentioned that he was an impressive figure, nearly seven foot tall and with enormous self-confidence.

== Lineage ==
Jean De Bus, a vine grower from Calais, arrived at the Cape on 25 April 1688, aboard De Oosterland with other French Huguenots. He married a Frenchwoman, Sara Jacob, and their son Jean and grandson Jean (sometimes known as Jan) married Cape Dutch women. This last marriage produced numerous offspring, including the son Coenraad De Buys (or Buys), who is regarded as the stamvader ("progenitor") of the De Buys or Buys people.

== Early life ==
By 1773, about eight homesteads had been built in the Langkloof. The pioneers of the area included Jan De Buys on the farm De Ezeljacht. He was the father of Coenraad De Buys. Coenraad was born on the farm Wagenboomrivier in 1761. He had his own farm, De Opkomst, near Kareedouw/Montagu.

When Coenraad was around 7 years old saw his father sitting on a chair "with his legs drawn up as stiff as planks". He was clutching his stomach and screaming. All that night he writhed in pain and died the next day. Coenraad walked to his half-sister Geertruy's house and told her about the death.

Geertruy told Coenraad that she had seen another man die in the same way - their mother Christina's first husband, Dirk Minnie, who was Geertruy's father.

It is widely believed that Christina had poisoned them both. Coenraad decided not to go back home and lived with Geertruy and her husband, David Senekal, raising the livestock he received from his father's estate. Christina married David's brother, Jacob Senekal, within six months.

== Rebellious life ==
In the early 1780s Coenraad lived on a farm near the Bushmans River in the Zuurveld with a Baster-Khoikhoi woman, Maria van der Horst, with whom he had seven children. Maria was of slave descent.

He often crossed the Fish River and raided cattle from the Xhosa. Langa, a Zuurveld chief, charged that De Buys had seized his wife and used her as a concubine, and two other chiefs said that De Buys had ‘withheld’ their wives and cattle. He went to live in the homestead of Ngqika well beyond the colonial border. Here he became the lover of Ngqika's mother, Yese, the wife of Mlawu kaRarabe, and became Nqqika's main advisor. He also took a Thembu wife, Elizabeth, and had many children with her.

During this time Coenraad was one of a number of white and coloured people who were on the Xhosa side in the frontier wars against the Boers and then the British.

From 1799 the Rharhabe chief Ngcika (also known as Ngqika and Gaika)’s "Great Place" was shared by his erstwhile friend "Khula" or Coenraad De Buys. This place was apparently in the Tyumi river valley, just south of Hogsback.

On 20 Sept 1799, Dr. Johannes Van Der Kemp, a missionary from the London Missionary Society, met Coenraad De Buys in Kaffirland, where Coenraad acted as interpreter for van Der Kemp with Ngqika. Coenraad also acted as advisor to Ngqika. Over that year and the next Coenraad and Dr Van Der Kemp's friendship grew.

At the end of 1800 Coenraad and Van Der Kemp decided to fight their way through the “Eastern Bosjesmen”, probably those near the Stormbergen, in order to find a new country. In the first days of January 1801, they were to cross the Kabusie river, the first stage of their trek. Van der Kemp was washed away by the strong river and nearly drowned in crossing, but Coenraad took a few strides towards Van Der Kemp and plucked him out of the river without getting himself wet.

During the Batavian period he moved to a farm in the Langkloof, where he lived with Maria, Elizabeth and a large family of mixed-race children.

Around 1812 Coenraad was living in George again, but soon had a falling out with Martha Ferreira. At her trial witnesses testified that Martha beat her slave Manissa almost daily with a sjambok and even caused Manissa to lose one of her eyes. On one particular day Manissa was sent to fetch wood. When Manissa didn't return after a while Martha followed her, but returned home without her.

Later, about a half-hour's walk from the farmhouse, a bundle of firewood which was tied with twine (made of tulip petals) was found. At that same location was a trail of bloody footprints, puddle of blood, a piece of taaiboshout (hardwood), drag marks, 'n karos and the small footprints of Martha Ferreira. This incident took place while Martha lived in a blockhouse; this was more than likely at Fort Frederick. Fort Frederick was built in 1799 to defend the mouth of the Baakens River and it stands overlooking Port Elizabeth Harbour.

Martha testified that Manissa, a Mozambican slave, was bought from an Englishman while they lived in Algoa Bay. She said that Manissa was very young, tender and small and that she had only chastised her, except that she once hit her back with a cane about five times. Martha further testified that Manissa suffered from "Mozambiquean sickness" and that she died from bloodletting, adding that the night before her death, Martha looked after her for the whole night, reporting her death to Veldkornet Jan van Niekerk, her brother. She had her slave Esua bury Manissa.

Several other cases were brought against Martha and, over time, the hearing at George concluded. Martha Ferreira was acquitted of some of the cases, while others were dismissed due to a lack of adequate witnesses. The only charge to which she was convicted for was wounding a slave on his head, for which a fine was imposed. During her trial at George, Coenraad de Buys testified against her, thereby further alienating himself from the community there.

In 1813 Coenraad moved north to the central region of the Gariep River and gathered his extended family together with allies from the Khoi, Oorlams Afrikaners, Basters and Xhosa.

Coenraad De Buys preceded organised trekking - he was 54 years old when he became a fugitive from a Boer uprising in the eastern Cape Colony, suppressed by the British in 1815.

== Death ==
By 1818 Coenraad moved northwards to the present province of Limpopo, now trading with the Sotho-Tswana and perhaps the Portuguese near Mozambique. He left behind an enormous number of descendants of mixed origin, later called the Buys Bastaards, who formed a distinctive community.

In 1820 Coenraad decided to move north down the Madikwe (Marico) River into the Limpopo valley. The Tsonga and Afro-Portuguese in the valley could supply him with gunpowder in exchange for ivory. He settled above the tsetse-fly and malarial belt in the Tswapong Hills east of Palapye, in present-day eastern Botswana.

During the trip Elizabeth contracted yellow fever and died where they had settled. In his elderly age, and unwell for many years, Coenraad was distressed. He undertook a last journey to Mozambique and asked his sons and their families to wait for him at the border on the Limpopo river. He never returned.

It is believed that he died shortly after this. Coenraad's remains were never found, and although there were rumours that he intended to travel to the Portuguese East Coast, no proof was ever found of him ever arriving there.

== Legacy ==
The town of Buysdorp was named after Coenraad De Buys. The 11000 hectares of land which today comprises Buysdorp (‘Buys town’) is situated in the foothills of the remote Soutpansberg (‘Salt Pan Mountain’) of the far northern Limpopo Province of South Africa. A hybrid community of some 300 individuals (de facto) or a few thousand (de jure), the Buys people have been confronted with successive political dispensations over the years. Having over decades developed autonomous structures and procedures of local governance, the ‘fit’ with the pre-1994 South African government was as comfortable as it was unacceptable to the new post-1994 democracy. Still, their history of interaction and intermarriage with surrounding communities have shaped perceptions of phenotypical and genotypical singularity and resulted in strategies to articulate their autochthony in order to define their ethnicity and to develop a kind of ‘moral geography’, their model of space, of their land.
