= 35 Squadron SAAF =

35 Squadron
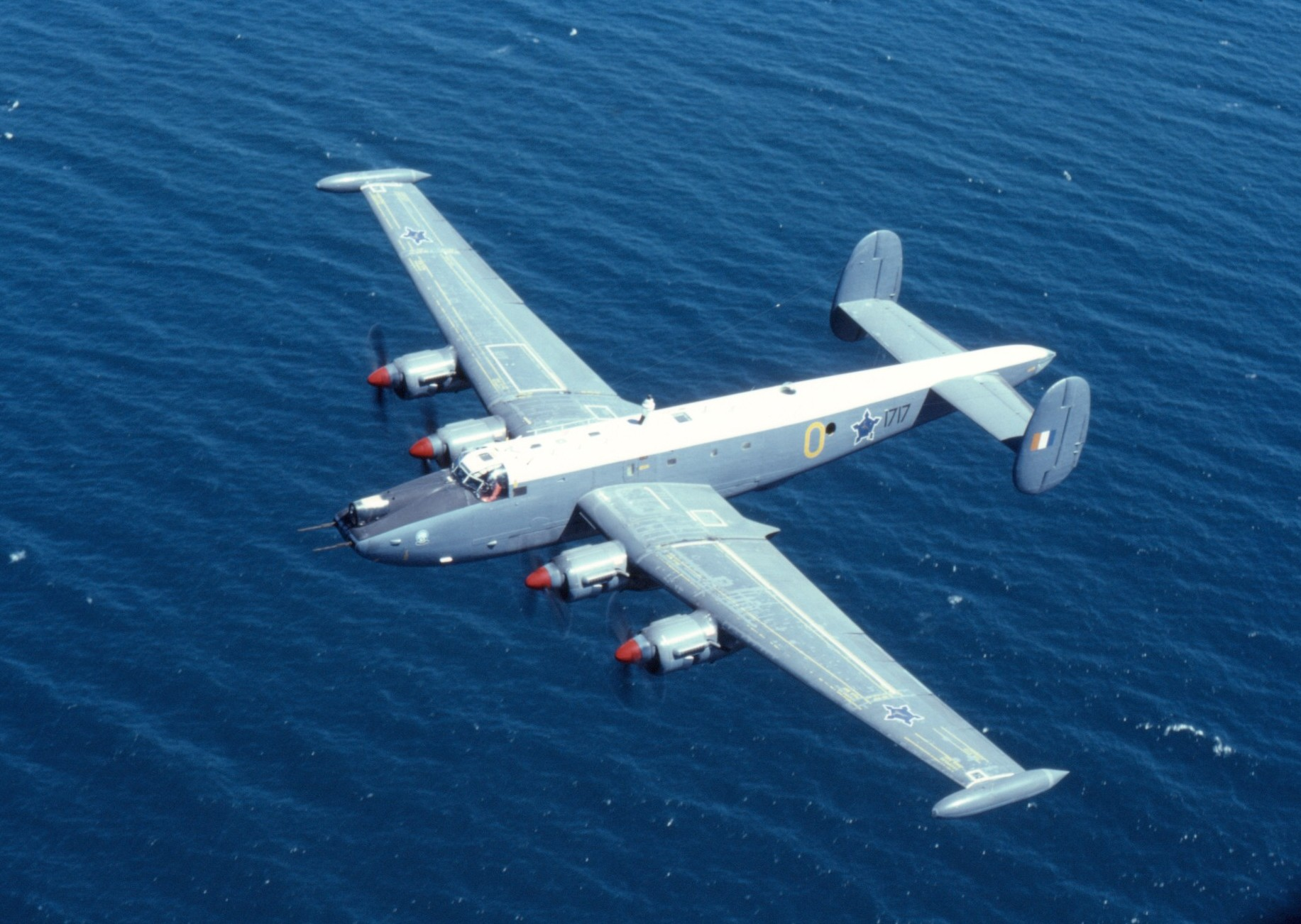
- Avro Shackleton no. 1717, c. 1982
- Active: 15 February 1945 - present
- Country: South Africa
- Branch: South African Air Force
- Role: maritime patrol and transport squadron
- Base: AFB Ysterplaat, Cape Town
- Motto(s): Shaya Amanzi ("Strike the Water")
- Aircraft: C-47TP "Turbo Dakota"

Insignia
- Squadron Identification Code: MS (1939-1945)
- Squadron Crest

35 Squadron SAAF is a squadron of the South African Air Force. It is a maritime patrol and transport squadron.

== History ==
The squadron was formed on 15 February 1945 when 262 Squadron Royal Air Force, an anti-submarine squadron, operating the Consolidated Catalina, was transferred to the South African Air Force.

== Awards ==
- Award for Best Permanent Flying Unit in the SAAF for both 2004 and 2005
- Sword of Peace in 2013

== Aircraft operated ==
From	To	Aircraft	Variant
Feb 1945	Jan 1957	Consolidated Catalina	Mk.IVb
Apr 1945	Oct 1956	Short Sunderland	GR.5
late 1940s	1952	North American Harvard	
late 1940s		Supermarine Spitfire	
late 1940s		Airspeed Oxford	
late 1940s	1960	Lockheed Ventura	
Jan 1957	Nov 1984	Avro Shackleton	MR.3
Nov 1984	1994	Douglas Dakota	C-47 "Dackleton"
Dec 1990	Present	Douglas Dakota	C-47TP "Turbo Dakota"

== Officer Commanding ==
From	To	Rank	Name & Surname
??	2017	Lt. Col	Donovan Chetty
2018	Present	Col	van de Horst
