= 80 Air Navigation School SAAF =

Unit in the South African Air Force

80 Air Navigation School
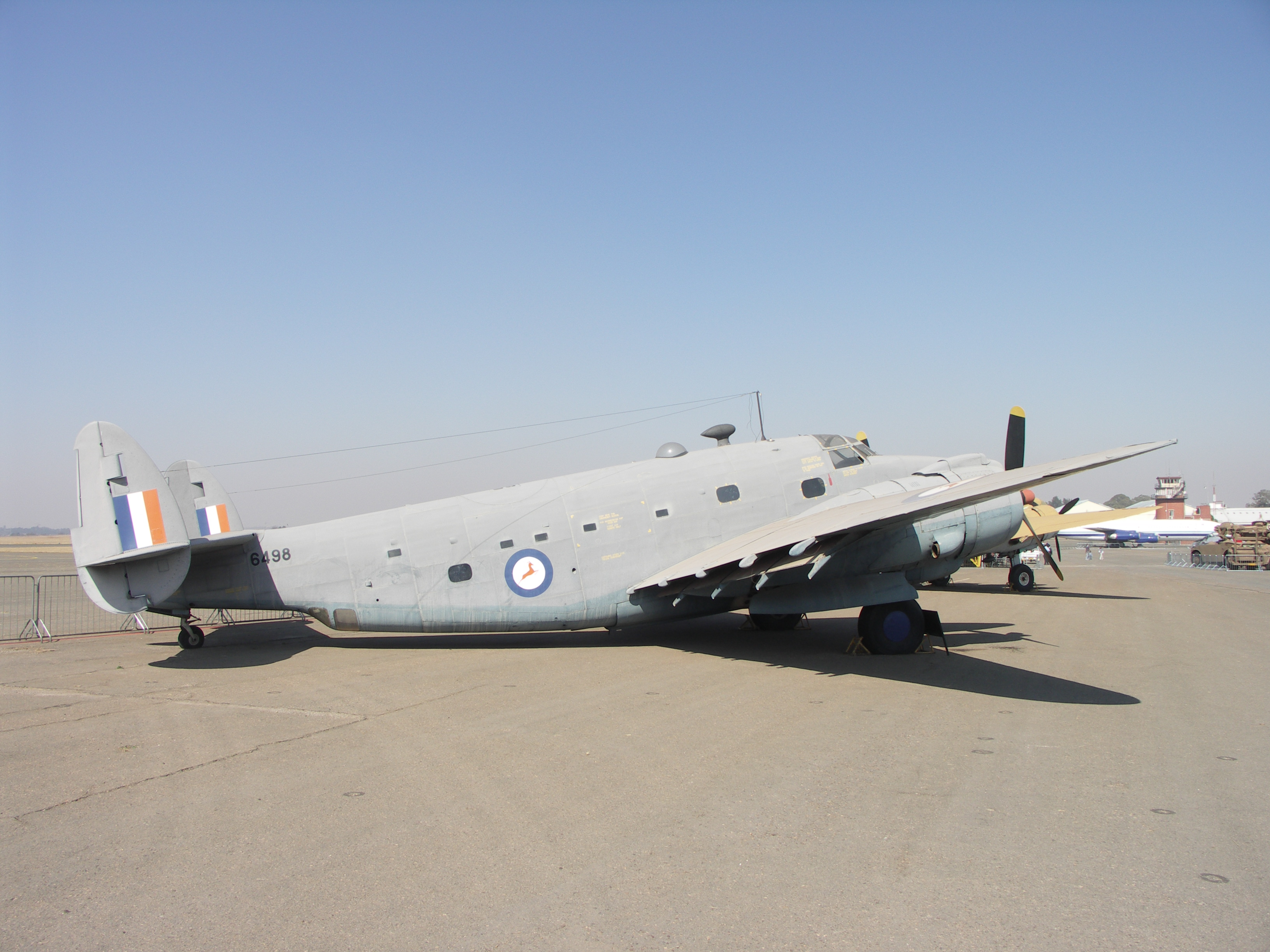
- Lockheed PV1 Ventura
- Active: 1 August 1946
- Country: South Africa
- Branch: South African Air Force
- Role: Training
- Garrison/HQ: AFB Ysterplaat
- Motto(s): Peritia Per Scientiam (Skills Through Knowledge)

80 Air Navigation School is a unit of the South African Air Force. It is currently an aerial navigation, maritime operations and maritime survival school.

- Historic aircraft flown: Lockheed Ventura, various on loan
- Current aircraft flown: None (the school loans the C-47TP, Cessna Caravan and PC-7 Mk.II Astra from other units as required)
