= Salt River (Western Cape) =

River in Cape Town, Western Cape, South Africa

Salt River Soutrivier
- Location of the mouth in South Africa
- Etymology: From sout, the word for salt in the Afrikaans language

Location
- Country: South Africa
- Province: Western Cape Province

Physical characteristics
- Mouth: Atlantic Ocean
  - location: Table Bay, City of Cape Town, Western Cape, South Africa
  - coordinates: 33°54′26.7474″S 18°28′16.5828″E
  - elevation: 0 m (0 ft)

Basin features
- Tributaries
  - left: Liesbeeck River
  - right: Black River, Elsieskraal River

The Salt River (Afrikaans: Soutrivier) is a river in the Western Cape province of South Africa. It is a confluence of the Black River which just previously has been confluenced by the Elsieskraal River, and the Liesbeeck River. It flows into Table Bay at the Salt River mouth. Its catchment is part of the Central Management Area of the City of Cape Town. In 1510 the area was the scene of the Battle of Salt River. On 24 May 1695 the VOC ships Oosterland and Kallendijk wrecked at the mouth of the river.

== See also ==
- Salt River, Cape Town, a suburb of Cape Town
  - Salt River railway station, a Metrorail train station in Salt River, Cape Town
- Battle of Salt River
- Salt River (Garden Route), a river mouthing near Nature's Valley
- List of rivers of South Africa
- List of estuaries of South Africa
