= SS.12/AS.12 =

NORD SS.12/AS.12
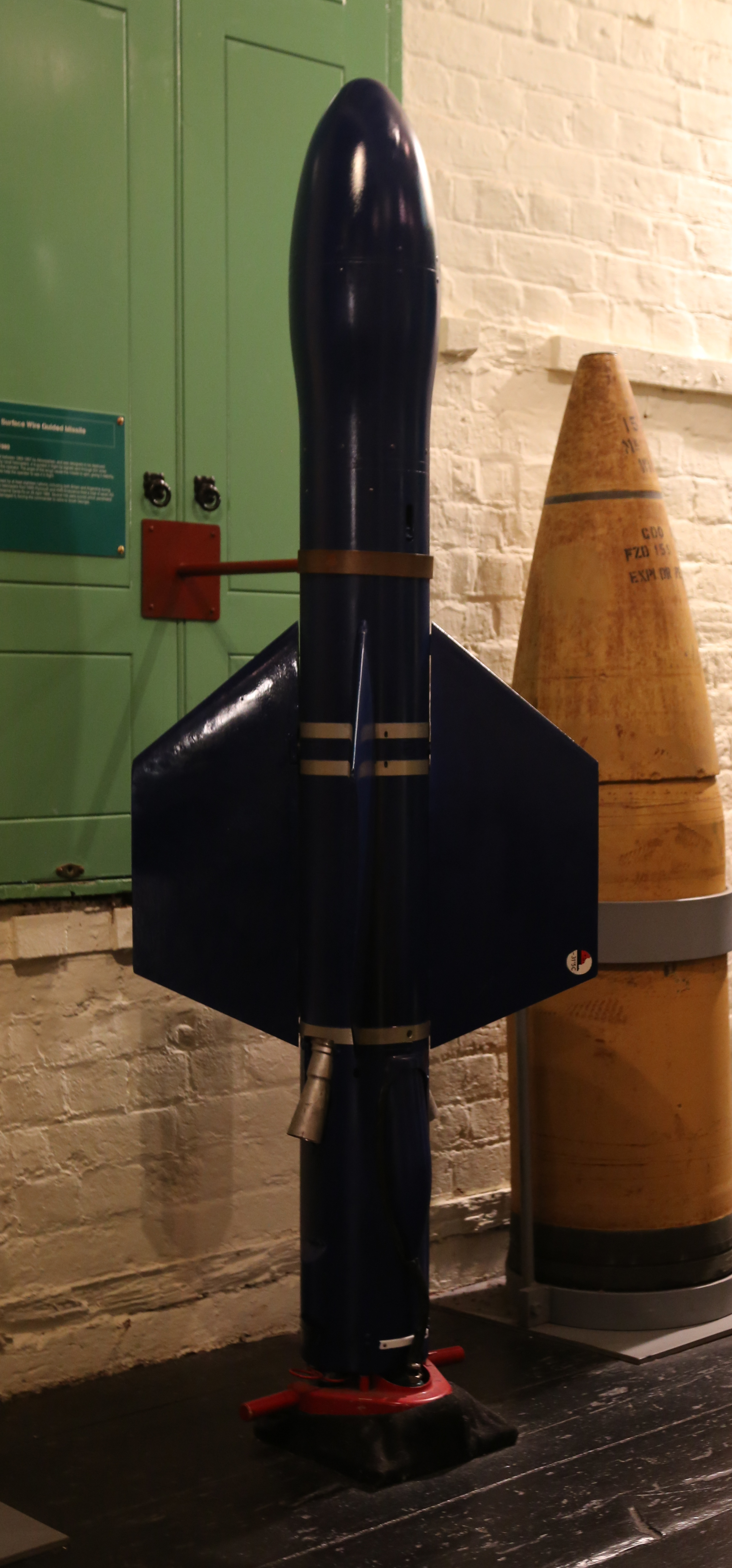
- Royal Navy AS.12, as carried by Westland Wasp helicopters
- Type: Surface-to-surface or air-to-surface missile
- Place of origin: France

Service history
- In service: 1960–present

Production history
- Manufacturer: Aerospatiale
- Produced: 1957–1982
- No. built: 10000+

Specifications
- Mass: 76 kg
- Length: 1.87 m
- Diameter: 180 mm (body) 210 mm (warhead)
- Wingspan: 650 mm
- Warhead weight: 28 kg
- Engine: solid fuel rocket
- Operational range: 7000/8000 m
- Maximum speed: 370 km/h
- Guidance system: wire MCLOS
- Steering system: thrust deflection
- Launch platform: Helicopter, aircraft, ground unit

External images
- Aérospatiale SS.12/AS.12
- AS.12(M)fitted Alouette III
- AS.12(M) fired from French Navy LYNX
- SS.12(M) fired from small patrol boat
- AS.12(M) French Navy Alouette III
- Manufacture's Fact Sheet

The SS.12 and AS.12 are two variants of the same missile: SS for surface-to-surface and AS for air-to-surface. It was designed in 1955–1957 by Nord Aviation, later Aérospatiale. It was a derivative of the NORD SS.10 and SS.11 missiles which were surface-to-surface wire-guided missiles for use by infantry, vehicle or a helicopter primarily in the anti-tank role, but also anti-material, anti-personnel and against light field fortifications. The SS.12/AS.12 was basically a scaled-up version of the SS.11/AS.11, with a massive increase in range and warhead weight. The SS.12/AS.12 original mission was primarily to be anti-shipping from naval helicopters and combat aircraft or ground launchers, and secondarily for use against heavy field fortifications. The range and the destructive power of its warhead are roughly equivalent to a 127 mm (5-inch) artillery shell.

== Development ==
The SS.12 was originally intended to be a surface-to-surface weapon. A naval surface-to-surface version, the SS.12M was developed at the same time. Trials of the weapon began in 1956. An air-launched version, the AS.12, was trialed in 1957.

== Description ==
The missile has a distinctive bulging nose and four clipped triangular wings. The missile has two solid fuel rocket motors. One is a powerful booster rocket that burns for 2.2 seconds, and the other is a sustainer motor that burns for 28 seconds. The booster motor exhausts through two nozzles on the sides near the trailing edge of the wings and the sustainer motor exhaust is located in the missile rear at the centre. The wings are positioned at an angle of one degree to the direction of flight so that the missile spins, giving it stability. Two rearward-facing flares, which ignite on launch, make the missile more visible to the operator during flight. The two flares are mounted on the opposite side of the booster nozzles between the wings so as not to interfere with the two guidance wires spooling out of the rear section of the missile.

The missile steers using four metal vanes around the exhaust nozzle in a thrust vectoring system that directs the thrust of the sustainer motor exhaust nozzle. Steering signals are sent to the missile by means of two wires which pay out from two spools on the rear of the missile. A gas-operated arming mechanism is fed from the sustainer motor, arming the warhead 7.7 seconds after launch.

The average maximum flight time of the missile is approximately 30 seconds, giving it a range of 7,000 meters according to whether it is ground-launched or air-launched. Operators train using the T10K simulator, which is a simple device that projects a beam of light on a predetermined path on a wall-mounted chart. The operator guides the light beam around the path by means of a small hand joystick, training to gain proficiency to position the beam just above the target five seconds before the end of flight, then gently flying the beam, which represents the missile's flight, down on to the target for final impact.

The simulator closely resembles the missile's reaction to signal reception, which has an increasing time delay the further the missile travels.

The missile can be fitted with a three different warheads:

- OP3C - a semi-armour piercing warhead mainly for naval use
- A shaped charge HEAT warhead for antitank
- A fragmentation warhead for anti-personnel use

The semi-armour piercing warhead has a delayed action allowing it to penetrate 20 mm of armour then travel two meters beyond before exploding.

== Service ==
The AS.12 originally entered service with the French Navy in 1960 in the air-to-surface role against ships and submarines on the surface. In 1966 the French Navy made an evaluation of the SS.11(M) and SS.12(M) from the fast patrol boat La Combattante. In 1966, the Libyan Navy ordered three fast patrol boats from Vosper (Sebha, Sirte and Susa). Delivered in 1968, these were the first operational naval vessels to be armed with AS.12(M), with four launch rails on each side of the vessel's bridge. The Libyan fast patrol boats proved to be a very low cost way to give long-range heavy firepower to small naval vessels. Other navies soon followed Libya and bought the SS.12(M) and SS.11(M) for their light naval vessels; among them Brunei, Ethiopia, France, Greece, Ivory Coast, Senegal, and Tunisia. Sweden bought the SS.12(M) (designated the Robot 54) as a heavier support for the SS.11(M) (designated Robot 52). NORD also developed a ten-missile trainable launcher for either the AS.11(M) or AS.12(M) which was sold in numbers due to its cost-effective firepower.

The AS.12 saw action on both sides of the 1982 Falklands War. It was fired from Westland Wasp helicopters against the Argentine submarine ARA Santa Fe. A total of nine missiles were fired at the submarine which was trapped on the surface and unable to dive after its dive tanks suffered damage from a depth charge attack by a British Royal Navy Wessex HAS.3 antisubmarine helicopter. Of the missiles fired four hit, four missed and one failed to launch. Two of the missiles that hit the target failed to detonate on impact, instead punching a hole through the slender conning tower and exploding on the far side.

In an unusual mission, it was fired from a British Royal Navy Wessex Hu.5 commando helicopter at Port Stanley town hall on 11 June 1982 in an attempt to disrupt a meeting of senior Argentine personnel that took place there every morning. Both missiles that were fired missed, one striking the roof of a police station and the other hitting some telegraph poles.

Production of the SS.11/SS.12 series ceased some time in the 1980s; but in 1978 168,450 missiles had been produced.

The AS.12 has been operational from the following aircraft:

- Breguet Alizé
- Lockheed P-2 Neptune
- Breguet Atlantique
- Westland Wasp
- Aérospatiale Alouette III
- Hawker-Siddeley Nimrod
- Westland Wessex

== Operators ==
- Argentina
- Brunei
- Chile
- Ethiopia
- France
- Greece
- Iraq
- Italy - aboard Navy helicopters.
- Ivory Coast
- Kuwait
- Lebanon
- Malaysia
- Senegal
- Spain - aboard Navy SH-3/AB-212ASW helicopters. Retired 1987.
- Sweden operates alongside SS.11 in anti-invasion against landing craft (Robot 54)
- Tunisia
- Turkey
- United Arab Emirates
- United Kingdom
- Royal Netherlands Navy - aboard Lockheed P-2H / P2V-7 Neptune and Brequet Atlantique maritime patrol aircraft
- Syria

== See also ==
- Sea Skua
- SS.11
- SS.10
