= Oosterland (1684) =

17th-century large East Indiaman of the Dutch East India Company

- A model of the Oosterland

History

Dutch Republic
- Name: Oosterland
- Namesake: Possibly the town of Oosterland
- Owner: Dutch East India Company; Chamber of Zeeland
- Completed: 1685
- Maiden voyage: Wielingen-Batavia
- Fate: Wrecked in Table Bay, 24 May 1697

General characteristics
- Type: East Indiaman
- Tonnage: 1123
- Length: 160 ft (49 m)
- Depth: 18 ft (5.5 m)
- Crew: 240-325 men

The Oosterland was a large 17th-century East Indiaman of the Dutch East India Company (Dutch: Vereenigde Oost-Indische Compagnie; VOC). She was wrecked in Table Bay during a storm on 24 May 1697, after being struck by the drifting Kallendijk (Note: Sources on the wreck name this ship Kallendijk. No VOC ship of that name appears in Dutch-Asiatic Shipping. The homeward fleet from Batavia that reached the Cape on 20 May 1697 included the Kattendijk (also spelled Cattendijk), a Zeeland ship built in 1694, which remained in Table Bay until 17 July 1697.) and breaking from her anchors. The shipwreck was discovered by amateur divers in 1988 on the South African coast a few hundred metres from the entrance to Milnerton Lagoon at the mouth of the Salt River. Excavation of the wreck started in the early 1990s in combination with the University of Cape Town and was led by Bruno Werz.

== Ship ==
The Oosterland was built in 1685 for the Chamber of Zeeland at the VOC ship yard in Middelburg. She undertook her maiden voyage on 25 November 1685 from Wielingen (Chamber of Zeeland) stopping at Santiago (Cabo Verde) from 12 March 1686 till 23 March 1686 and then at the Cape of Good Hope from 17 May 1686 till 8 June 1686 and arrived at Batavia on 31 July 1686.

The ship was a Dutch "Mirror Return Ship" (Dutch: Spiegelretourschip) built as an East Indiaman for transport between the Dutch Republic and the settlements and strongholds of the Dutch East India Company in the East Indies. Under the captainship of Karel de Marville the ship departed on 29 January 1688 from Wielingen and carried Huguenot refugee families to the Cape of Good Hope where she arrived on 25 April 1688; four people died on this voyage.

The ship undertook four voyages during her service, three of which carried expensive Asiatic products such as textiles, indigo, tropical woods, nuts, baskets and special porcelain.

These voyages took place:

Voyage	Departure	From	Arrival	Destination	Captain	Cape of Good Hope
1	25 Nov. 1685	Wielingen	31 Jul. 1686	Batavia	Karel de Marville	17 May 1686 - 08 Jun. 1686
1	13 Dec. 1686	Batavia	Aug. 1687	Wielingen	Karel de Marville	20 Mar. 1687 - 20 Apr. 1687
2	29 Jan. 1688	Wielingen	19 Jul. 1688	Batavia	Karel de Marville	25 Apr. 1688 - 15 May 1688
2	25 Dec. 1688	Batavia	9 Aug. 1689	Wielingen	Aamoud Scheiteruit	17 Mar. 1689 - 17 Apr. 1689
3	8 Feb. 1691	Wielingen	28 Nov. 1691	Batavia	Aamoud Scheiteruit	17 Jun. 1691 - 20 Jul. 1691
3	28 Feb. 1693	Ceylon	4 Oct. 1693	Rammekens	Aamoud Scheiteruit	20 May 1693 - 12 Jun. 1693
4	16 Jul. 1694	Zeeland	11 Jun. 1695	Batavia	Pieter van Ede	31 Dec. 1694 - 03 Mar. 1695
4	17 Feb. 1697	Ceylon	Wrecked 24 May 1697		Pieter van Ede	Table Bay

== Sinking ==
On 16 July 1694 the Oosterland left Zeeland with 342 people on board and reached Batavia on 11 June 1695; 71 people died on this voyage. On 17 February 1697 she left Ceylon on her homeward voyage under the captainship of Pieter van Ede. With many of her crew ill, she put into Table Bay, where the homeward-bound fleet from Batavia, including the Kallendijk and the Waddinxveen, was also lying at anchor. On 23 May 1697 a strong north-westerly gale arose. Early the next morning the Kallendijk broke from her anchors, drifted and struck the Oosterland, severing her anchor cable. The Kallendijk was brought under control and re-anchored, but a few hours later the Oosterland's cables parted again. She drove onto the shallows near the mouth of the Salt River and foundered, and the Waddinxveen was wrecked in the same storm.

According to one report, 185 of the 200 people on board died when the Oosterland foundered; according to another, only two of the 300 people on board survived.

== Shipwreck ==
In 1988 amateur divers Graham Raynor, Michael Barchard and Christopher Byrnes discovered two shipwrecks only 6 m down at the mouth of the Salt River, a few hundred metres from the entrance to Milnerton Lagoon, and contacted maritime archaeologist Bruno Werz. Excavation started in the early 1990s in combination with the University of Cape Town; it was South Africa's first systematic maritime archaeology project. The wrecks were identified as the Oosterland and the Waddinxveen from their cannons. Excavation was hindered by strong winds, currents, cold water and low visibility. Many artifacts were recovered, including personal effects, cannons, coils of rope, textiles, cinnamon, wood, diamonds and Chinese porcelain.

The wreck site is protected under the South African National Heritage Resources Act, No. 25 of 1999, and may not be disturbed without the permission of the South African Heritage Resources Agency (SAHRA).

== Historical significance ==
Besides carrying Asiatic cargo, the Oosterland gave passage to various Huguenot refugee families to the Cape.

On the ship's second voyage to the East, she arrived in Table Bay in April 1688. Among the passengers were the ancestors of famous South Africans such as Frederik Willem de Klerk, Coenraad de Buys, Morné du Plessis, Charlize Theron and Daniel Theron.

=== Passengers of the Oosterland to the Cape ===
The families who travelled on the Oosterland:

- Sara Cochet, widow, from Zeeland with three le Clercq children
  - Abraham le Clercq
  - Joost le Clercq
  - Jeanne le Clercq
- Antoinette Carnoy (born 1630)
  - Marie-Madeleine le Clercq (1660–1721) from Flanders x Jacques de Savoye (1636–1717) from Flanders
    - Marguerite-Thérèse de Savoye (1672–1713) from Flanders.
    - Barbe-Thérèse de Savoye (1674–1713) from Flanders.
    - Jacques de Savoye (1687–1708) from Flanders.
- Jean Imbert (–1723), from Nîmes, Languedoc.
- Daniël Nortjé (1667–1711) from Picardy x Marie Vitu (1668–1711) from Picardy.
- Jacques Nortjé (1669–1743) from Picardy.
- Jean Nortjé (1671–1694) from Picardy.
- Jean Prieur du Plessis (1638–1708) from Poitou x Madeleine Menanteau (born 1662) from Poitou.
  - Charl Prieur du Plessis (1688–1737) Born at sea.
- Isaac Taillefert (1651–1699) x Suzanne Briet (1653–1711) from Champagne.
  - Isabeau Taillefert (1673–1735) from Champagne.
  - Jean Taillefert (1676–1708) from Champagne.
  - Isaac Taillefert (1680–1689) from Champagne.
  - Pierre Taillefert (1682–1726) from Champagne.
  - Suzanne Taillefert (1685–1724) from Champagne.
  - Marie Taillefert (1687–1689) from Champagne.
- Jean Cloudon (died 1700) from Champagne.
- Jean Parisel (1667–1707) from Villiers le Bel, Ile-de-France.
- Jean de Buys (6 Sep 1670 –) from Marck, Picardy.
- Sara Avicé (died 1688) from Chateaudun, Orleanais.
- Marie Avicé from Chateaudun, Orleanais.
- Jacques Theron (1668–1739) from Languedoc.

== Modern culture ==
The high school in Secunda, South Africa, Hoërskool Oosterland, has this ship as its namesake.

== Sources ==
- Turner, Malcolm (1988), Shipwrecks and salvage in South Africa – 1505 to the present., Cape Town: Struik, ISBN 0-86977-387-9
- Werz, Bruno E. J. S. (2008), 'Een Bedroefd, en Beclaaglijck Ongeval'. De Wrakken van de VOC-Schepen Oosterland en Waddinxveen (1697) in de Tafelbaai., Zutphen, Netherlands: Walburg Pers
- Bruijn, J.R.; Gaastra, F.S.; Schöffer, I. (1987), Dutch-Asiatic Shipping In The 17th and 18th Centuries (3 Vols)., The Hague, ISBN 978-94-017-1311-5
- Coetzee, Leon; Jordaan, Frans (2011), The Huguenots Story (from France to South Africa)
