= Liesbeek River =

River in Cape Town, South Africa

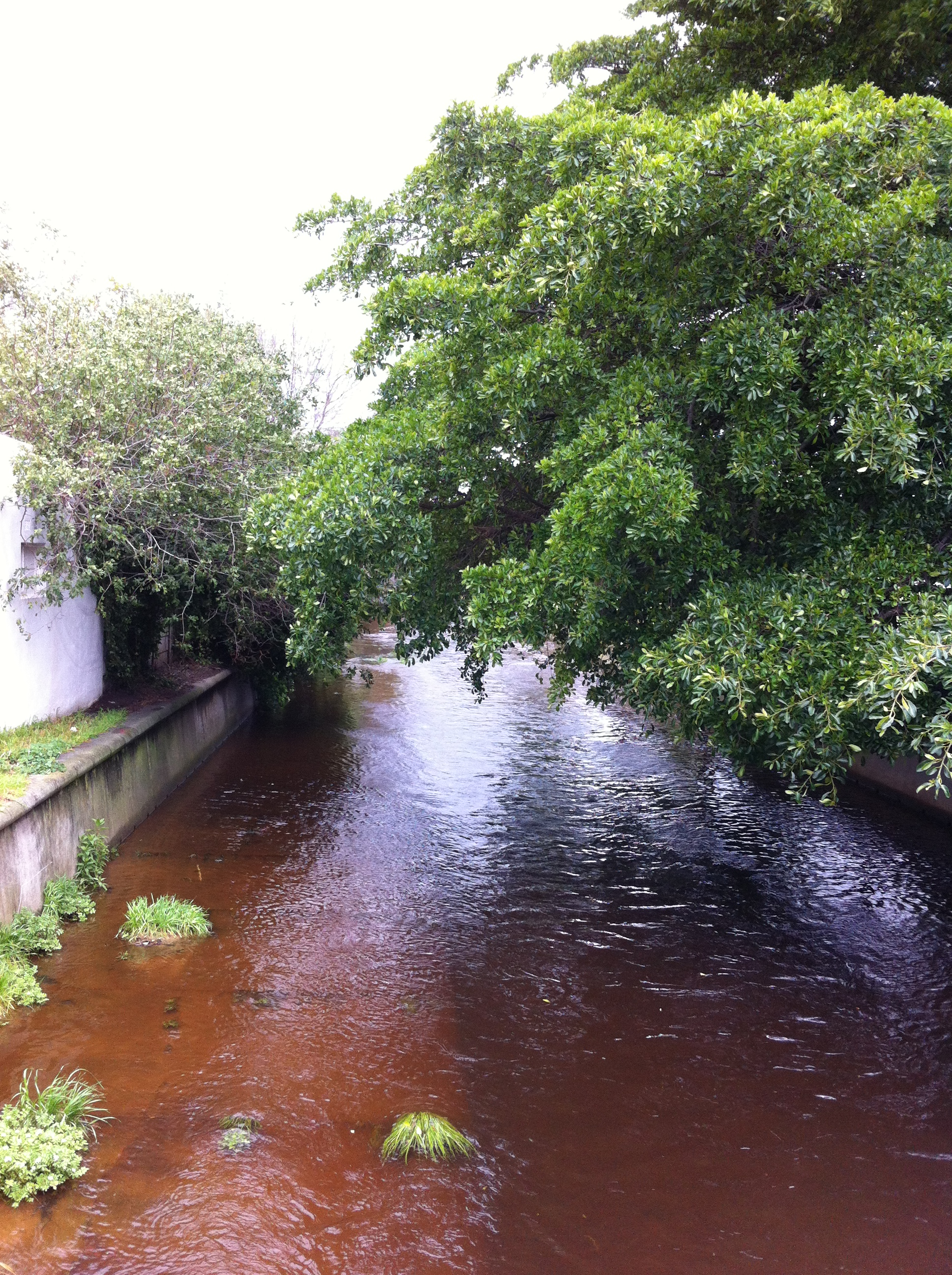
- Liesbeek River in Rosebank

Location
- Country: South Africa
- Region: Cape Town

Physical characteristics
- Length: 9 km (5.6 mi)

The Liesbeek River (also spelt Liesbeeck) is a river in Cape Town in South Africa. It is named after a small river in the Netherlands. The first "free burghers" of the Dutch East India Company were granted land to farm along the river in 1657, shortly after the first Dutch settlers arrived in the Cape. The river was originally called the Amstel or Versse Rivier. It is the first river that Jan van Riebeeck named.

The Liesbeek, which is less than 9 km (5.6 mi) long, is situated in the oldest urbanised river valley in South Africa. The headwaters flow from the eastern slopes of Table Mountain above Kirstenbosch Botanical Gardens where the vegetation is largely indigenous. The slopes of Bishopscourt have large properties, including Jan van Riebeeck's farm. Water abstraction occurs here, often to water residential gardens, causing the flow to reduce during the summer months.

In Newlands, there are smaller residential plots. South African Breweries and the Josephine Mill are located here. From Rondebosch, large sections of the river are canalised, and the short sections of the river that are not canalised are degraded by erosion as a consequence of the increased flow from the canalised sections.

Below Rosebank and Mowbray, at Observatory, is the confluence of the Liesbeek and Black River 33°55′47.59″S 18°28′41.97″E. The Two Rivers Urban Park is located on land between the Liesbeek and the Black with heritage sites and designated public open spaces. At this confluence, the Black River becomes the Salt River and empties into Table Bay at Paarden Eiland.

The Liesbeeck is home to the Platanna, or African clawed frog, an amphibian that has been important in certain areas of medical research.

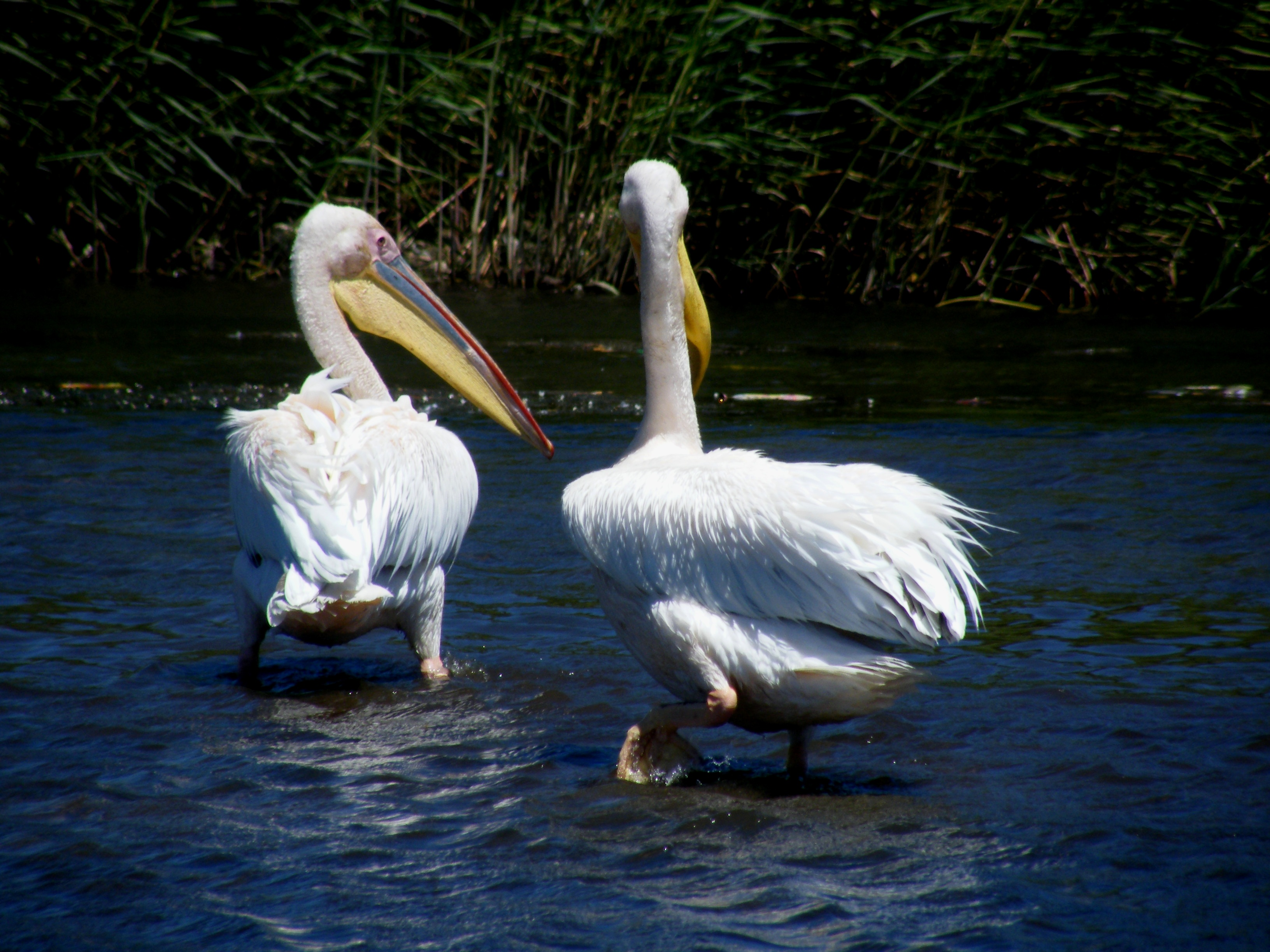
Great white pelicans in the Liesbeek River

== Gallery ==
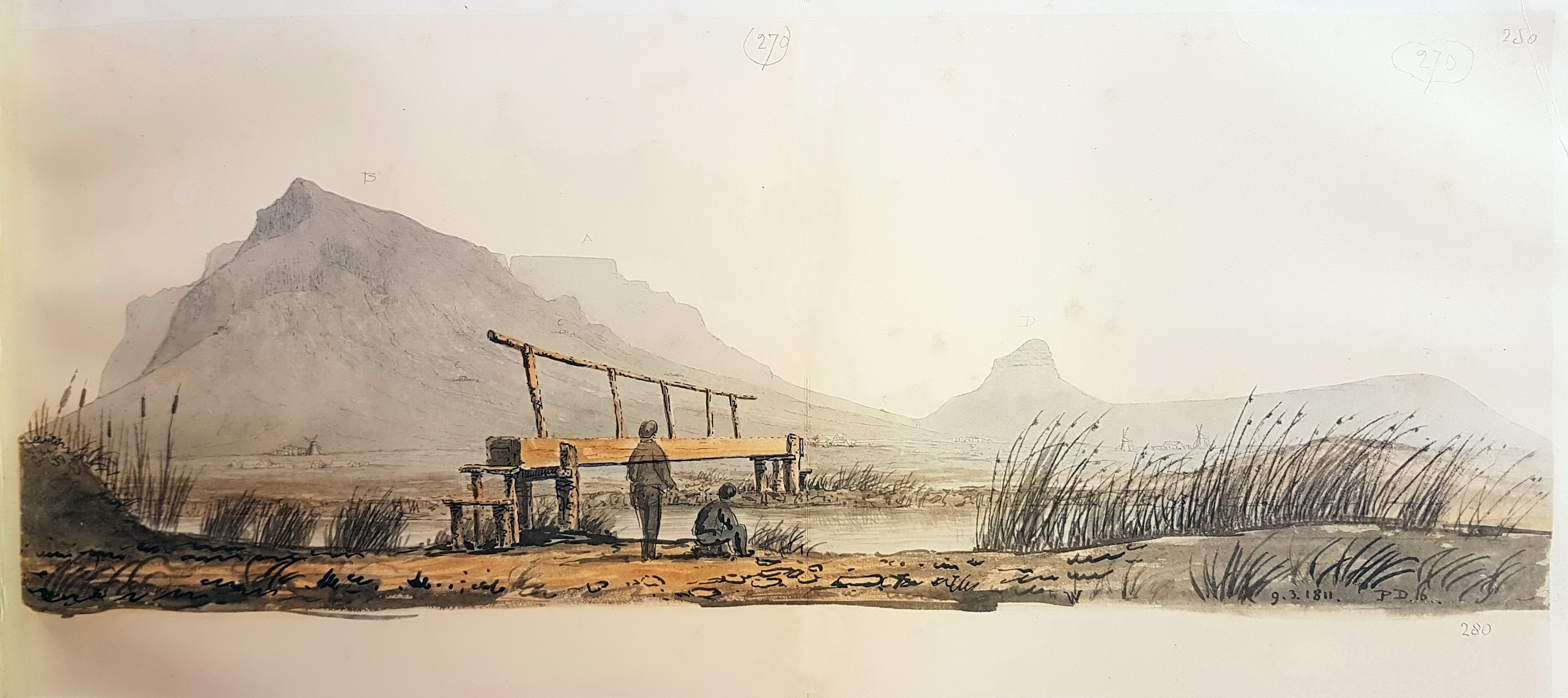
Pedestrian Bridge over Liesbeek River - William John Burchell 1811
