= Ysterplaat =

Suburb of Cape Town, in Western Cape, South Africa

- Interactive map of Ysterplaat
- Coordinates: 33°54′23″S 18°29′42″E
- Country: South Africa
- Province: Western Cape
- City: Cape Town

Area
  - Total: 2.78 km^{2} (1.07 sq mi)

Population (2011)
  - Total: 838
  - Density: 301/km^{2} (780/sq mi)

Races
  - White: 17.8%
  - Asian: 1.6%
  - Cape Coloureds: 32.2%
  - Black: 48.2%
  - Other: 0.2%

Languages
  - Afrikaans: 55.2%
  - Xhosa: 24.3%
  - English: 11.6%
  - Southern Sotho: 2.4%
  - Other: 6.5%

Ysterplaat is a northern suburb of Cape Town, South Africa, around 10 km west-northwest of City Hall. It borders Paarden Eiland to the southwest, Brooklyn and Rugby to the west, Kensington to the south, and Century City to the northeast.

Ysterplaat, on the beach where Jan van Riebeeck landed on April 7, 1652, is well known for the local Air Force Base Ysterplaat. The base was used as the civilian Maitland Airfield as early as 1929, and officially changed its name from AFB Brooklyn to AFB Ysterplaat on April 1, 1949.

The Ysterplaat Reformed Church seceded on December 7, 1940, from its mother church, the Maitland Reformed Church, which then stretched to nearby Milnerton, Table View, and Bloubergstrand.

== Sources ==
- Olivier, Rev. P.L. (compiler) (1952). Ons gemeentelike feesalbum. Cape Town/Pretoria: N.G. Kerk-uitgewers.
