= Brooklyn, Cape Town =

Brooklyn
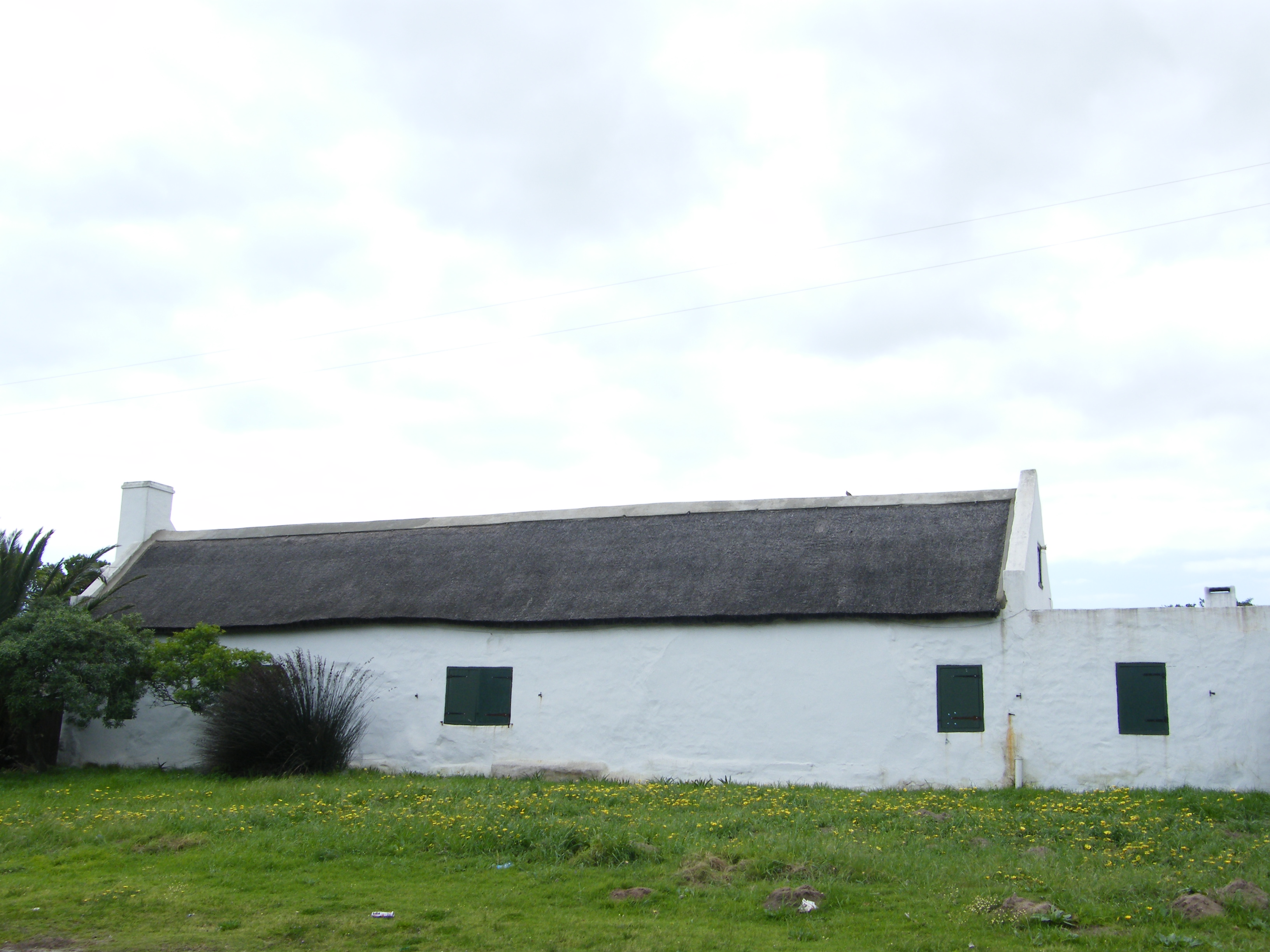
- Klein Zoar in Brooklyn
- Interactive map of Brooklyn
- Coordinates: 33°54′37″S 18°28′58″E
- Country: South Africa
- Province: Western Cape
- Municipality: City of Cape Town
- Main Place: Cape Town

Government
  - Councillor: Fabian Ah-Sing (DA)

Area
  - Total: 1.58 km^{2} (0.61 sq mi)

Population (2011)
  - Total: 10,941
  - Density: 6,920/km^{2} (17,900/sq mi)

Racial makeup (2011)
  - Black African: 35.6%
  - Coloured: 31.5%
  - Indian/Asian: 1.2%
  - White: 30.3%
  - Other: 1.5%

First languages (2011)
  - English: 52.6%
  - Afrikaans: 22.3%
  - Xhosa: 5.1%
  - Other: 20.1%
- Time zone: UTC+2 (SAST)
- Postal code (street): 7405
- Area code: 021

Brooklyn is a suburb of Cape Town, Western Cape with a population of 10,941 people. It lies to the north of Maitland, east of the Atlantic Ocean and Paarden Eiland, and west of Air Force Base Ysterplaat. The Black River flows through a section of Brooklyn.

== Governance ==
Brooklyn is situated within Ward 55 of the City of Cape Town Metropolitan Municipality. The incumbent ward councillor is Fabian Ah-Sing of the Democratic Alliance. Ward 55 is also part of Subcouncil 15.

== Demographics ==
The 2011 census recorded that the population of Brooklyn consists of 10,941. Of these, 50.37% are female and 49.63% are male. 35.60% described themselves as "Black African", 31.46% as "Coloured", 30.28% as "White", 1.17% as "Indian" or "Asian" and 1.49% as other. 52.62% of people spoke English as their first language, 22.25% spoke Afrikaans, 5.05% spoke Xhosa and 20.08 spoke other languages.

== Education ==
Schools in the suburb are:

- Buren High School
- Holy Cross Convent School
- Ysterplaat Primary School
- Ysterplaat Junior Primary School

== Transport ==
The M5 goes through Brooklyn. The N1 is situated to the south of Brooklyn. MyCiTi has routes that go through Brooklyn, so busses pass regularly through the suburb. Major roads in the suburb include Section Street and Koeberg Road.

== Shopping ==
The Northgate Estate is located in Brooklyn. It is situated directly on the intersection between the N1 and M5. The estate has more than 150 tenants including major retail chain stores.
