= Maitland, Cape Town =

Suburb of Cape Town, South Africa

Maitland
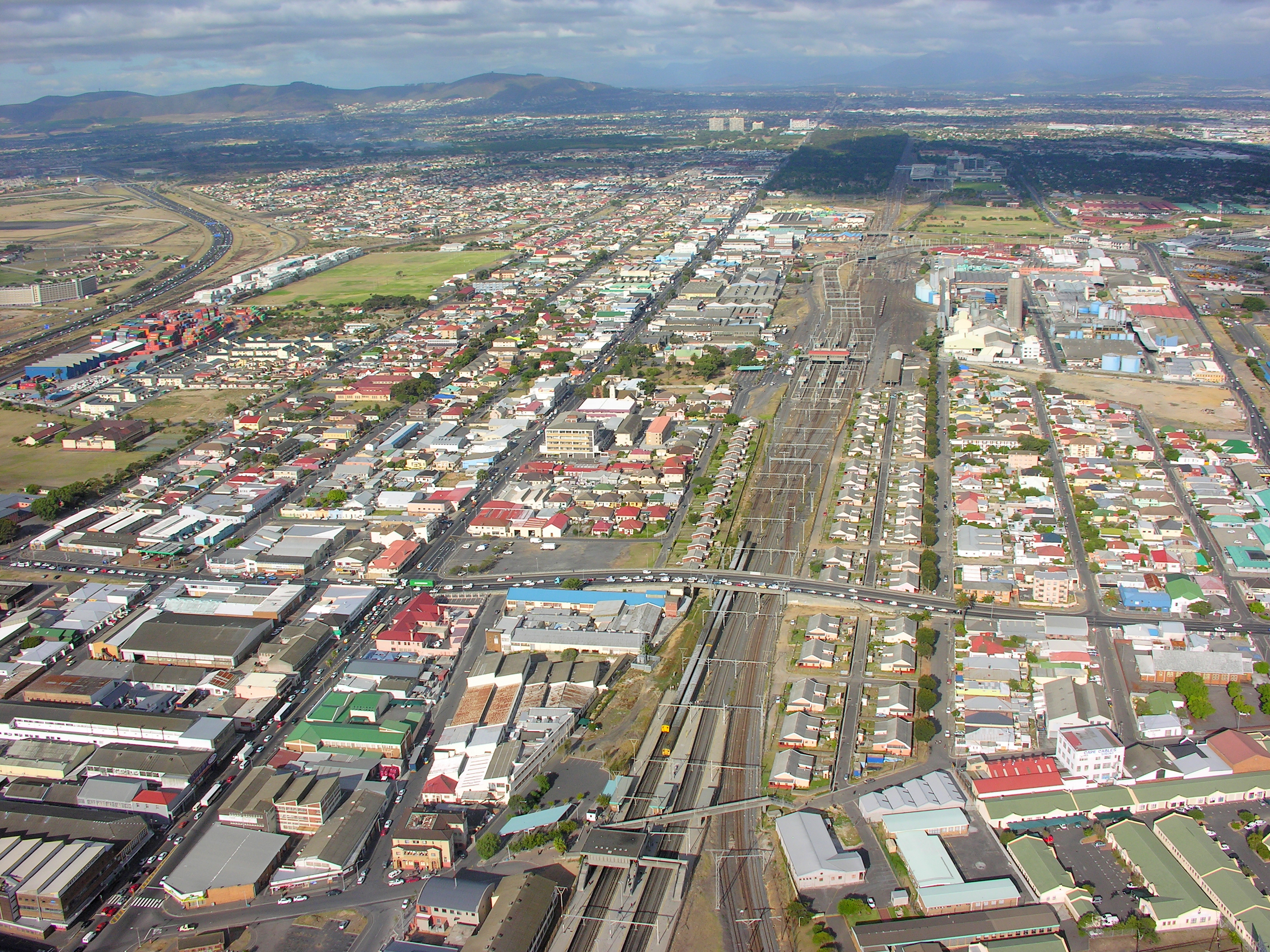
- An aerial view of the railway lines running through Maitland towards the East of Cape Town.

- Location within Western Cape Location within South Africa Location within Africa
- Coordinates: 33°55′29″S 18°29′13″E
- Country: South Africa
- Province: Western Cape
- Municipality: City of Cape Town
- Main Place: Cape Town

Government
  - Councillor: Asa Abrahams (Ward 24) (DA); Brian Watkyns (Ward 53) (DA); Cheslyn Steenberg (Ward 56) (PA)

Area
  - Total: 3.95 km^{2} (1.53 sq mi)

Population (2011)
  - Total: 9,782
  - Density: 2,480/km^{2} (6,410/sq mi)

Racial makeup (2011)
  - Black African: 41.7%
  - Coloured: 49.9%
  - Indian/Asian: 1.9%
  - White: 2.6%
  - Other: 4.0%

First languages (2011)
  - English: 58.0%
  - Afrikaans: 16.5%
  - Xhosa: 3.8%
  - Zulu: 1.0%
  - Other: 20.7%
- Time zone: UTC+2 (SAST)
- Postal code (street): 7405
- PO box: 7404

Maitland is a mixed-use suburb of Cape Town, South Africa. Situated in the Blouberg region of the city, Maitland comprises residential, commercial, and light industrial buildings.

The suburb is located along a number of important transport networks connecting the Cape Town city bowl to the rest of the city. The most important of these are the railway line, which runs through the middle of the Maitland, and the N1 freeway that is situated on its northern boundary.

The area has always been an important transport hub for the city. One of the city's main freeway interchanges - Koeberg Interchange - sits in the northwestern part of Maitland.

== History ==
In 1845, one of the first roads from Stellenbosch through the Maitland area was completed. This effectively connected Cape Town to the rest of Africa as at the time the dunes of the Cape Flats prevented much traffic between the two locations. The suburb is named after Sir Peregrine Maitland who was governor of the Cape in the mid-1840s.

== Geography ==
Maitland lies to the north of Pinelands, south of Brooklyn, east of Salt River and west of Goodwood.

== History ==
During the Second Anglo-Boer War, Maitland was the site of a major British cavalry camp, where troops and horses recovered from the voyage from Britain.

== Demography ==
The 2011 census recorded the population of Maitland as consisting of 9,782 people. 49.9% described themselves as "Coloured", 1.9% as "Indian or Asian", 41.1% as "Black African", 2.6% as "White" and 4.0% as "Other". 58.0% spoke English as their first language, 16.5% spoke Afrikaans, 3.8% spoke Xhosa, 1.0% spoke Zulu and 20.7% spoke another language.

== Local schools ==
- Maitland High School
- Holy Cross High School
- Koeberg Primary school

== In popular culture ==
The Standard Hotel located in Maitland was featured in the 2012 film Safe House. It features as one of the "seedy hotels" that the main protagonists seek refuge in.

The shrine of a well known Muslim Sufi saint i.e. Hazarat Khawaja Sayed Mehboob Ali Sha (R.A) is situated at the Maitland Cemetery gate 4A is also a source of blessings and unity of many communities. The shrine that still attracts thousands of devotees from all around the world.

Maitland Cemetery is also home to South Africa's only alkaline hydrolysis facility, where Archbishop Desmond Tutu's remains were famously liquefied following a state funeral.

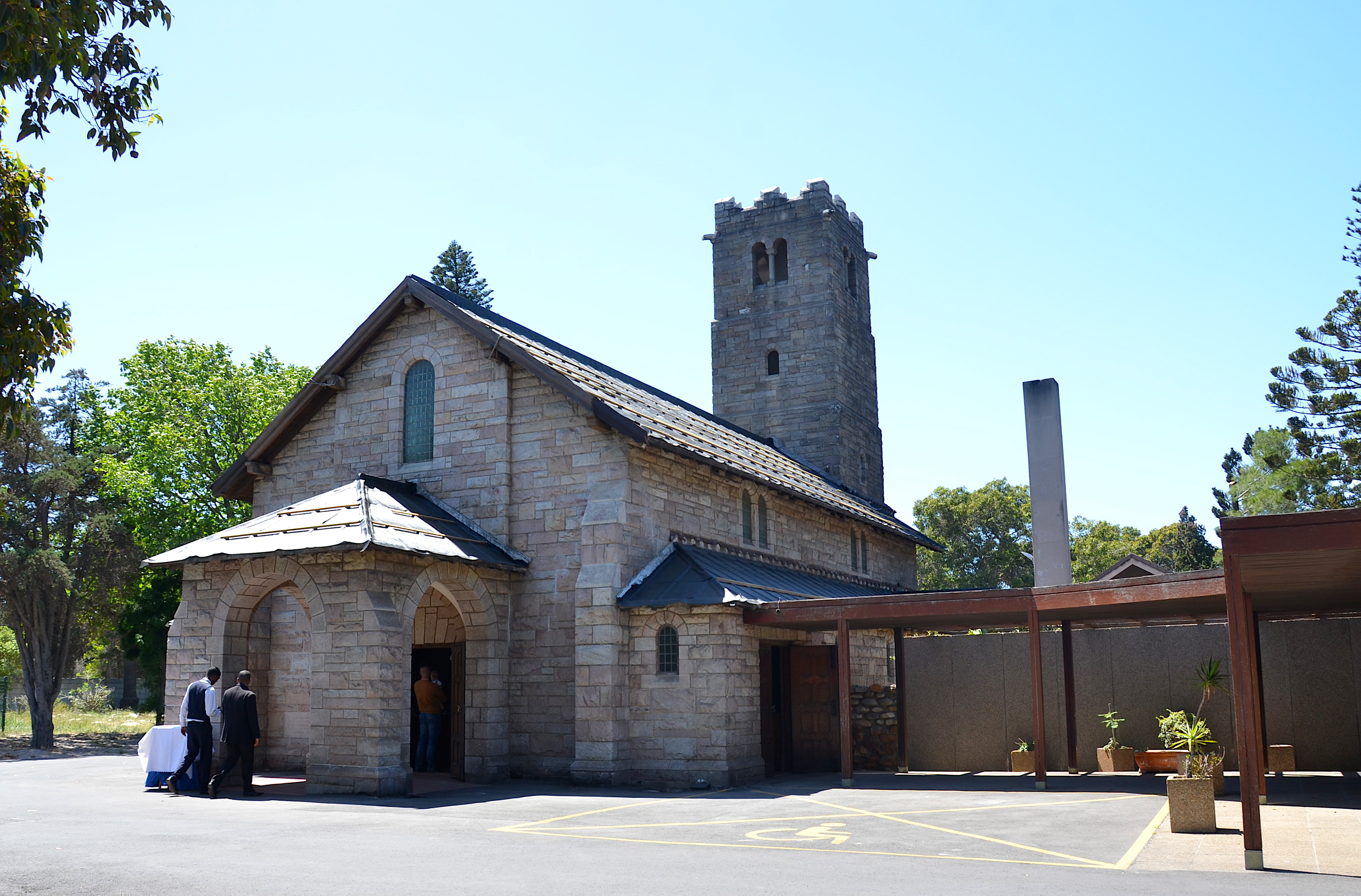
Chapel at Maitland Crematorium
