= Black River (Cape Town) =

River in Western Cape province, South Africa

Black River Swartrivier
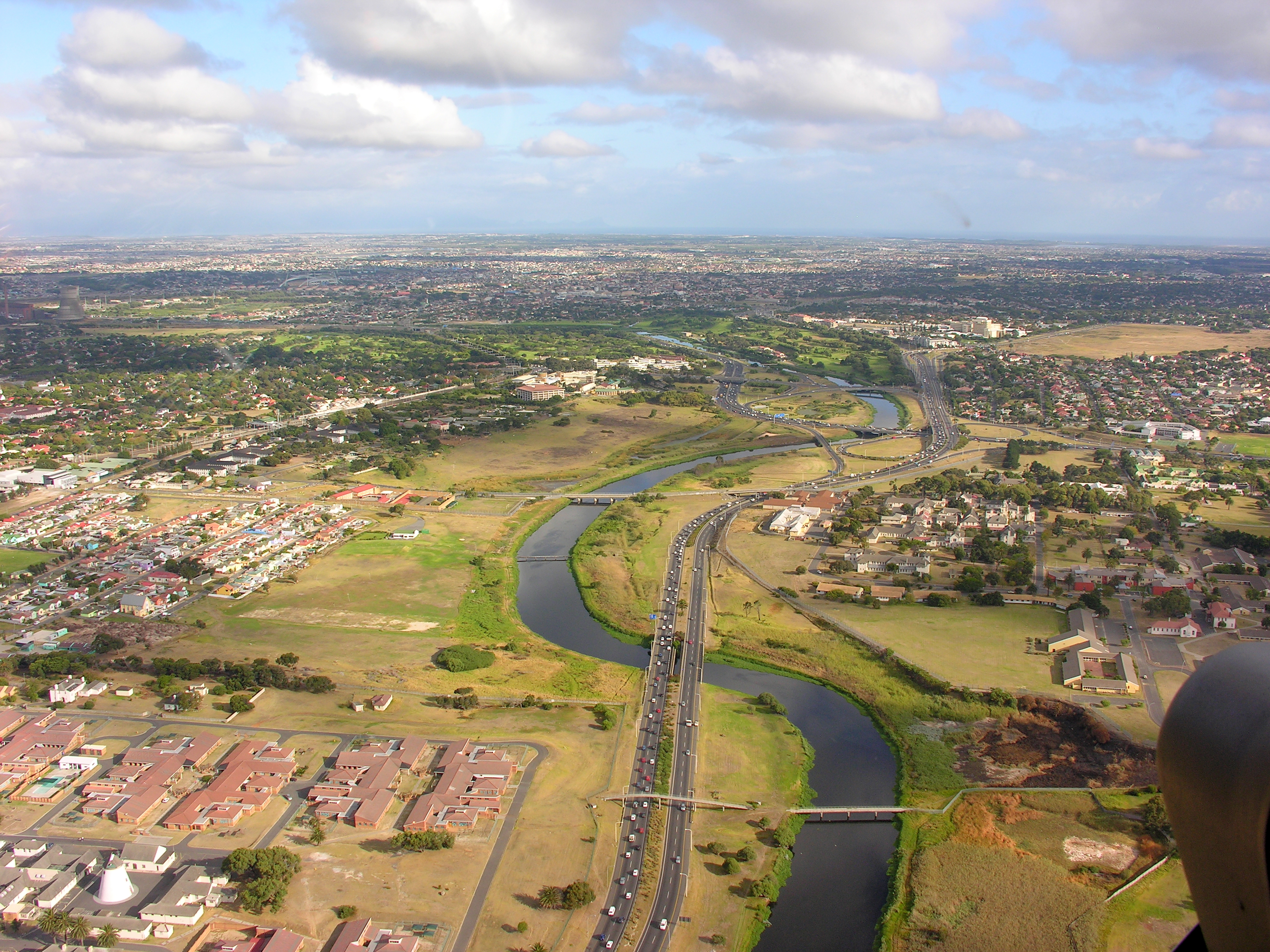
- An aerial view of the Black River with the M5 highway running alongside it.
- Etymology: From swart, the word for "black" in the Afrikaans language

Location
- Country: South Africa
- Province: Western Cape Province

Physical characteristics
- Source
  - location: Cape Flats, City of Cape Town, Western Cape, South Africa

The Black River (Swartrivier) is a river in Cape Town, South Africa. It is a tributary of the Salt River together with the Liesbeeck River and the Elsieskraal River. It rises in Arderne Gardens and flows partly underground and partly canalised through Claremont and Rondebosch, then uncanalised through Mowbray, Observatory and Maitland after which it joins the Salt River. Its catchment is part of the Central Management Area of the City of Cape Town and the city has canalised 58% of the river.

== See also ==
- List of rivers of South Africa
- List of estuaries of South Africa
