= Battle of Salt River =

Portugal v. indigenous group, 1510

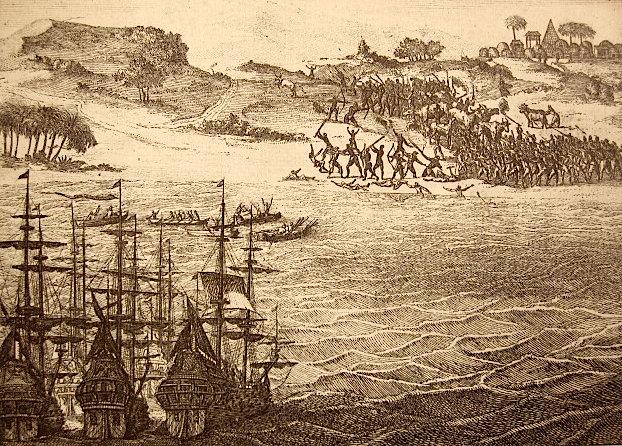
Date	1 March 1510
Location	Observatory and Salt River, Western Cape, South Africa; 33°55′36″S 18°28′19″E
Result	ǃUriǁʼaekua victory

Belligerents
Portuguese Empire	ǃUriǁʼaekua

Commanders and leaders
Francisco de Almeida †	Unknown

Strength
~150	~170

Casualties and losses
64	Unknown

The Battle of Salt River was a small military engagement between the crew of a Portuguese fleet led by Francisco de Almeida and the indigenous ǃUriǁʼaekua ("Goringhaiqua" in Dutch approximate spelling), notable for being the first military encounter between Europeans and indigenous people in what would later become South Africa. The battle resulted in a massacre of Portuguese forces and a victory for the ǃUriǁʼaekua.

== Background ==
After winning the Battle of Diu in the Indian Ocean, Almeida sailed for Portugal in December 1509 and reached Table Bay near the Cape of Good Hope, where the Garcia, Belém and Santa Cruz dropped anchor late February 1510, to replenish water. There they encountered the local indigenous people, the ǃUriǁʼaekua Khoikhoi abaThwa/Khwe nation. After friendly trade with the ǃUriǁʼaekua, a group of 12 or 13 of the crew members visited their nearby village, situated in modern-day Observatory or Mowbray.

Accounts differ on what happened in the ǃUriǁʼaekua village over whether the Portuguese started hostilities by attempting to steal cattle or the ǃUriǁʼaekua attempted to steal items from the Portuguese. The Portuguese were chased from the village back to their ships, whereupon they begged Almeida to take revenge. The Portuguese officers debated at length on whether to take retaliatory action, and Almeida eventually agreed to conduct a punitive raid the next morning.

The 16th century Portuguese historian Gaspar Correa blames the Portuguese sailors for starting the altercation in the village and notes that the ǃUriǁʼaekua were likely already wary of the Portuguese presence, worrying that they might establish themselves in the area. Almeida stated before the battle that in his opinion his own men were likely to blame for causing the hostilities.

== Battle ==
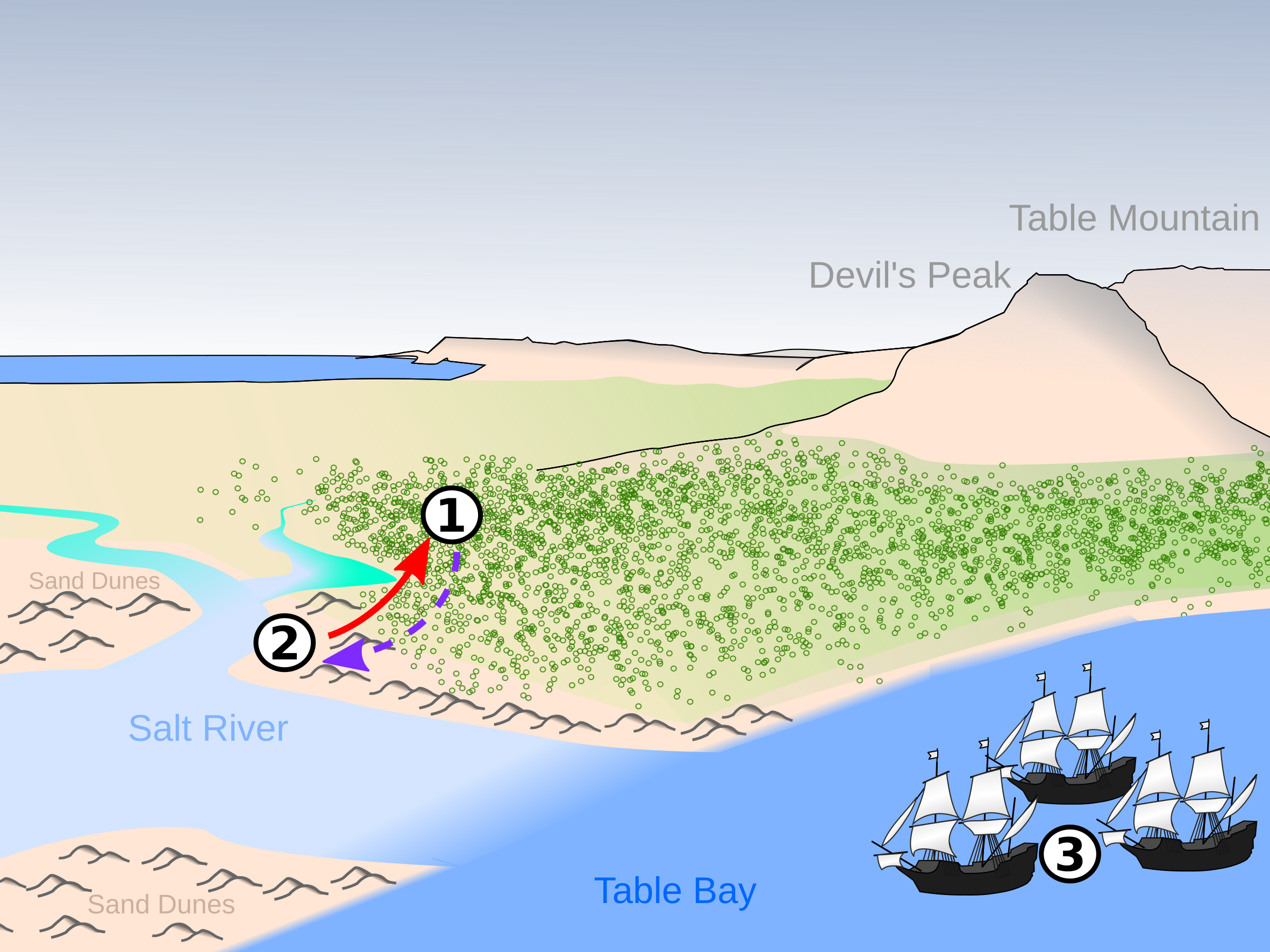
1: Estimated location of ǃUriǁʼaekua village 2: Estimated death location of Francisco de Almeida and crew 3: Portuguese fleet Portuguese attack route Portuguese retreat route

Almeida allowed his captains Pedro and Jorge Barreto to return to the village on the morning of 1 March 1510 with a force of around 150 men armed with swords, crossbows and spears and raided the village. The South African military historian Willem Steenkamp speculates that the ǃUriǁʼaekua allowed the Portuguese to advance inland so as to be able to engage with them at close quarters when they entered the heavily bushed areas more inland. The Portuguese reached the village which they found deserted except for a few children and cattle, which the Portuguese started abducting and stealing.

A force of around 170 ǃUriǁʼaekua counterattacked with stones, fire-hardened wood-tipped spears and poisoned arrows. The ǃUriǁʼaekua also deployed especially trained cattle which would respond to specific whistles and whoops. When the ǃUriǁʼaekua weapons proved ineffective against the Portuguese, they used their "cattle as moving shields, hiding behind them, and accurately throwing assegais and stones at the Portuguese." The ǃUriǁʼaekua's sudden and controlled close-quarters attack resulted in a Portuguese rout, forcing them to retreat to the beach at what is today a part of Salt River, Cape Town.

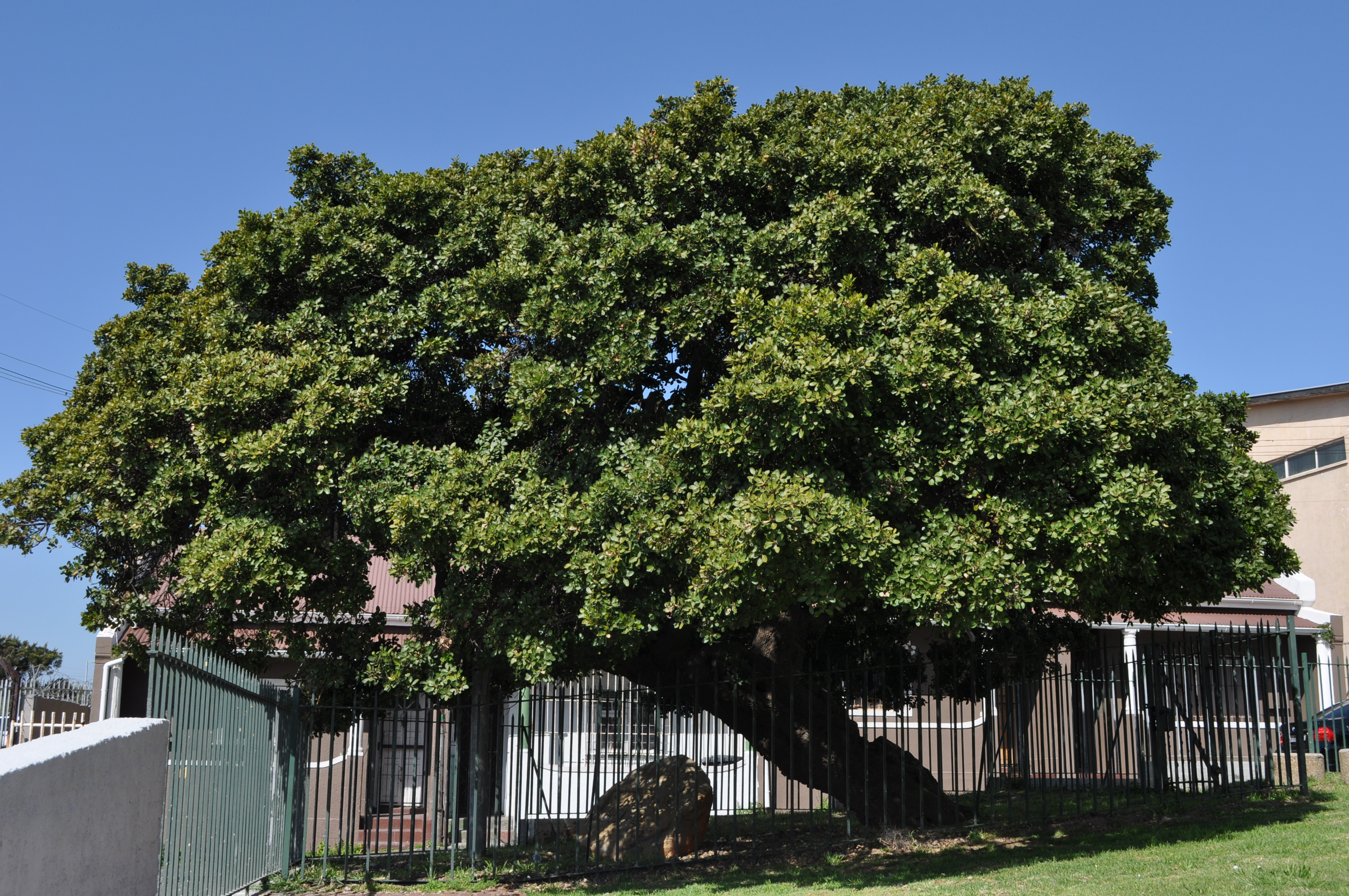
The massacre of 64 Portuguese sailors, including de Almeida, took place close to the Treaty Tree in modern day Woodstock.

As the flagship's master Diogo d'Unhos moved the landing boats to a watering point farther up the beach, the Portuguese were left without a retreat when they reached the beach. The ǃUriǁʼaekua sensed the opportunity for an attack, during which Almeida and 64 of his men perished, including 11 of his captains. A number of the Portuguese combatants caught on the beach managed to survive the battle by retreating farther up the beach to the landing-boats at the watering-points. Almeida's body was recovered the same afternoon and buried on the shore close to where he died.

== Plot theory ==
The South African archivist Nicolaas Vergunst suggested in a 2011 book that de Almeida was the victim of a plot by his own men, who intentionally cut off his retreat after the planned provocation of the ǃUriǁʼaekua.

== Impact ==
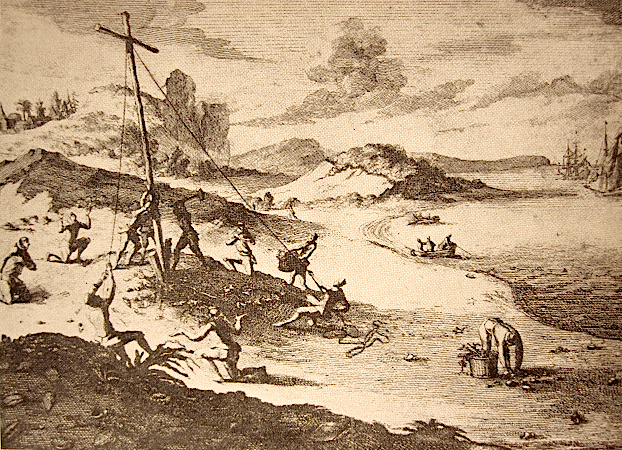
Portuguese sailors erecting a cross on Almeida's grave in Salt River two years after the battle in 1512.

The loss was a notable military embarrassment for the Portuguese and led to stricter enforcement of an earlier policy of theirs not to land ships in the region. It also earned the Khoikhoi clans of the region a reputation for ferocity amongst European nations. The Portuguese directive not to land ships in the region put them at a long-term disadvantage with the Dutch, English and French when competing for trade and influence in the Indian Ocean, as their competitors did land on the coast for replenishment.

The battle has been sporadically used as a parable by a number of writers since the 1500s to reflect on moral or political anxieties of their times. Contemporary Portuguese writers such as Correa, João de Barros and Luís de Camões, and later British writers such as Thomas Herbert and William Julius Mickle, use the battle to reflect on the “tensions and synergies between military conquest and commercial pursuit”. In recent times former South African President Thabo Mbeki has portrayed the battle to reflect on what he viewed as the “first moment of black anti-colonial struggle”.
