= Air Force Base Ysterplaat =

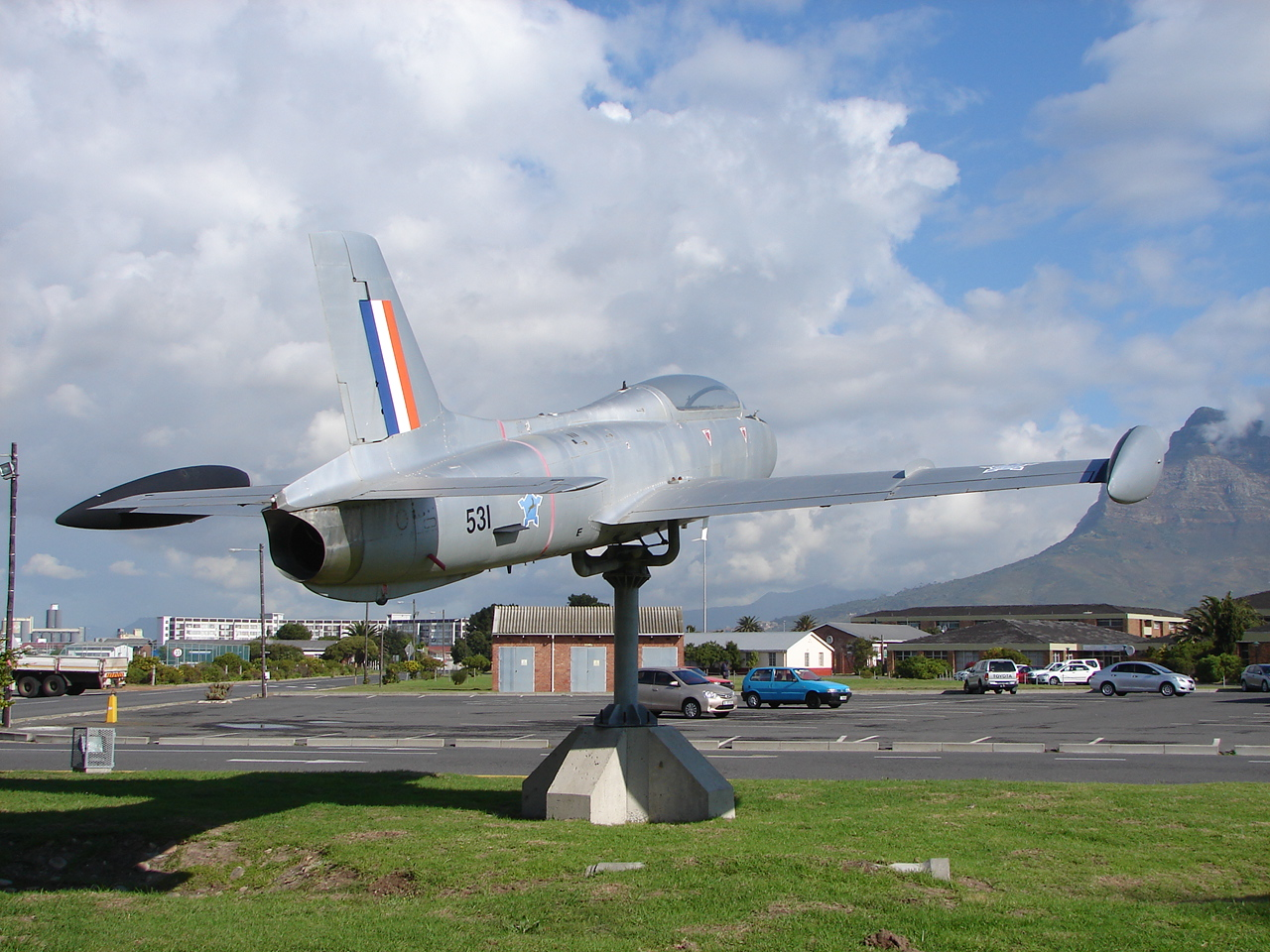
- Impala Mk I plinthed at AFB Ysterplaat
- IATA: none; ICAO: FAYP

Summary
- Airport type: Military
- Owner: Government of South Africa
- Operator: South African Air Force
- Location: Cape Town, Western Cape, South Africa
- In use: 1941–present
- Commander: Col. E.M.T. Wilson
- Occupants: 22 Squadron; 35 Squadron
- Elevation AMSL: 49 ft / 16 m
- Coordinates: 33°54′23″S 018°29′42″E
- Website: https://www.saairforce.co.za/the-airforce/bases/11/air-force-base-ysterplaat

Map

Runways
Direction	Length		Surface
Direction	ft	m	Surface
02/20	5,200	1,585	Asphalt

Air Force Base Ysterplaat (ICAO: FAYP) is an airbase of the South African Air Force. It is located in the Cape Town suburb of Ysterplaat, on the southwestern coast of South Africa. The name Ysterplaat is Afrikaans from the Dutch "Ijzerplaats", meaning "Iron Place" or "Place of Iron" in English.

The base's motto is Fortiter In Re (Resolute in Action).

== Units hosted ==
- 22 Squadron SAAF - Helicopter squadron
- 35 Squadron SAAF - Transport/Maritime patrol squadron
- 110 Squadron SAAF - Light transport (reserve)
- 505 Squadron - Security services
- 80 Air Navigation School SAAF
- 2 Air Support Unit detached - Maintenance support

== History ==
The site of AFB Ysterplaat was originally used as a civilian airfield, known as Maitland Aerodrome, from as early as 1929. African Air Transport (AAT) opened at Maitland in 1938, and was involved in training pilots for the Union Air Training Group's pupil pilot training scheme.

With the coming of World War II the land the aerodrome was situated on was donated to aid the war effort by Sir David Graaff, 1st Baronet on condition his estate would be consulted should it ever be used for non-military purposes. On 24 October 1941 Air Force Station Brooklyn, as it was then known, opened as a SAAF unit.

In 1946, the first jet aircraft to reach South Africa, a Gloster Meteor III, was assembled and flown at Brooklyn. On 1 April 1949, AFS Brooklyn was renamed AFS Ysterplaat. It lies now literally in the heart of Cape Town, South Africa's legislative capital. More jets were assembled at Ysterplaat from 1950 in the form of the de Havilland Vampire FB Mk.5s, which were the SAAF's first operational jet fighters. Unit status was upgraded to an Air Force Base (AFB) on 1 February 1968.

== Current use ==
Although the base has long been the centre of the SAAF's maritime patrol activities along the Cape coast, due to increased budgetary restrictions, the base was scheduled to be downgraded to an Air Force Station (AFS Ysterplaat) on 1 April 2003, but as of August 2004, this has not yet happened. The SAAF is considering converting the base into a civilian airport with a military presence, but no decisions have been taken as of yet. However, AFB Ysterplaat restricted airspace helps trainees at local flight training schools based at Fisantekraal or Morningstar Airfield in honing their round-trip skills while flying en route the Cape Peninsula, thus creating strong bonds between the base and the diverse flying community of the Western Cape. The Young Falcons wings ceremony is held also at AFB Ysterplaat.
