= 2023 Cape Town taxi strike =

2023 Cape Town taxi conflict

2023 Western Cape taxi strike
- Part of Taxi wars in South Africa
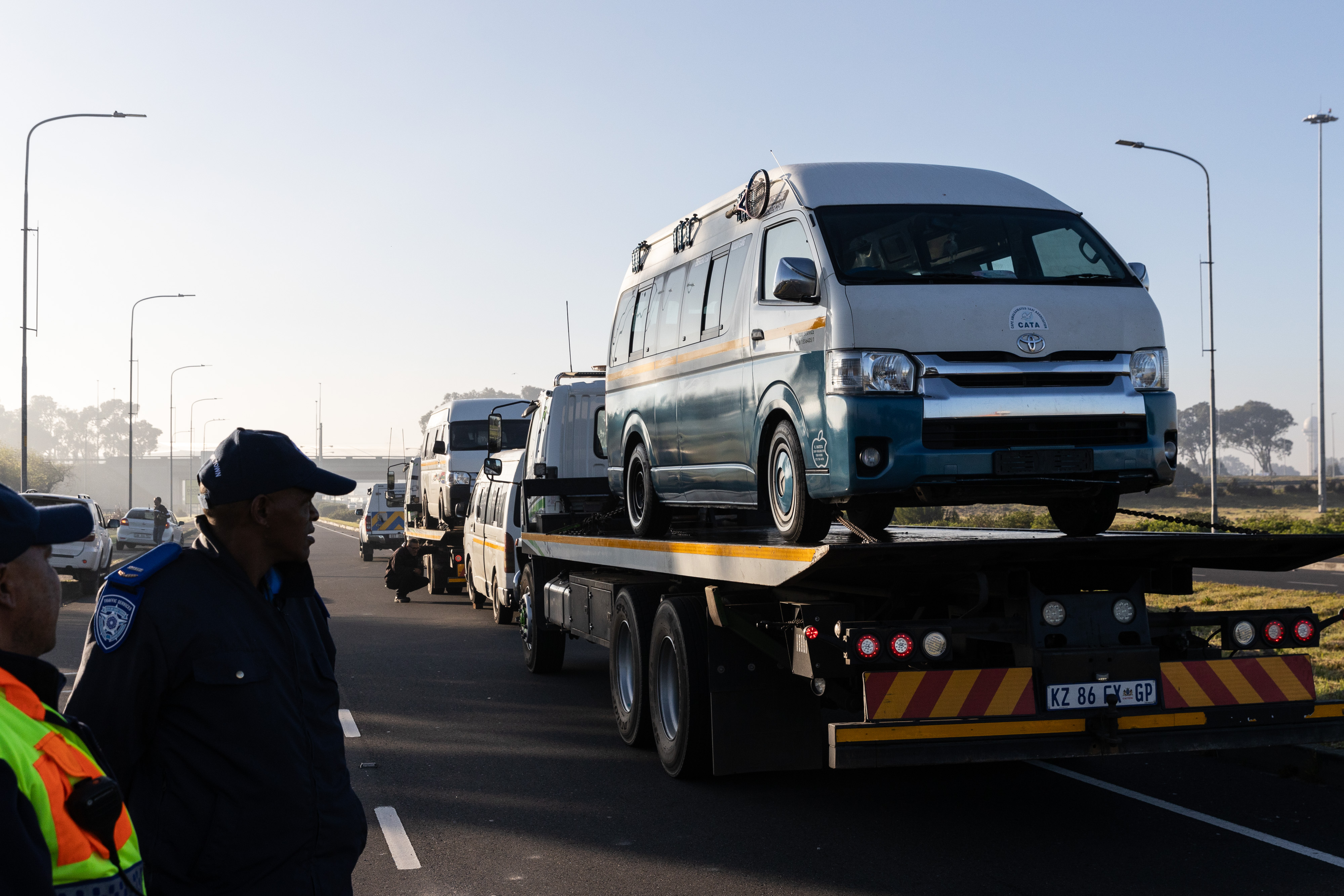
- Taxis being impounded in Cape Town during the strike. Photo by Ashraf Hendricks/GroundUp News.
- Date: 2 August 2023 – 10 August 2023
- Location: Western Cape, South Africa
- Caused by: Implementation of the National Land Transport Act and the impoundment of violating taxis.
- Goals: Stop the impounding of taxis for infringing national and municipal laws, address other outstanding grievences.
- Methods: Suspension of minibus taxi services, road blocks, protests, stoning of vehicles, torching vehicles, shootings.
- Result: SANTACO accepts initial offer by the City of Cape Town

Parties
South African National Taxi Council: Minibus Taxi Operators	Government of South Africa: South African Police Service; Western Cape Provincial Traffic Department; City of Cape Town

Lead figures
	Mayor Geordin Hill-Lewis; Alderman JP Smith

Casualties
- Deaths: 5
- Arrested: 120
- Damage: Multiple public buses and private vehicles set alight, municipal and private property damage, a number of private businesses looted.

The 2023 Cape Town taxi strike, also known as the 2023 Western Cape taxi strike, was a law enforcement dispute between minibus taxi operators in the Western Cape province of South Africa, as represented by South African National Taxi Council (SANTACO), and the City of Cape Town. The strike started at 13:00 SAST on Thursday, 3 August 2023 with SANTACO stating their intention to end the strike after 7 days on 10 August 2023 but confirmed its continuation indefinitely on 9 August.

The strike was started after SANTACO claimed that minibus taxi drivers had been unfairly targeted by authorities impounding their vehicles for legal and road safety infractions, a secondary grievance was a lack of progress with resolving other grievances. SANTACO stated that a requirement for ending the strike was that all impounded minibus taxis be released without having to pay any fines.

People allegedly associated with the strikers violently attacked motorists, municipal and public bus operators & drivers, commuters, and police officers. SANTACO denied being involved in any violence associated with the strike as they were not operating following its start.

The Cape Town neighbourhoods of Philippi and Nyanga experienced the worst violence.

== Background ==
Prior to the incident the Western Cape province had seen numerous violent incidents ranging from taxi operators targeting public busses and trains, to violent conflicts between minibus taxi operators such as during the 2021 Cape Town taxi conflict. Violence targeting public busses and service delivery trucks often occurred following law enforcement efforts focused on unlicensed taxi drivers and unroadworthy minibus taxis.

On 2 August 2023 the City of Cape Town impounded a number of minibus taxis at the Cape Town Central Taxi rank in the city centre for violating the National Land Transport Act which authorises the impounding of offending vehicles. Taxi drivers responded by blocking the exit route from the rank. A traffic officer was assaulted and shots were fired. The authorities responded with tear gas and stun grenades. The city's alderman for safety and security, JP Smith, denied accusations of police brutality during the impoundments and stated that the city would not be intimidated by violent elements within the minibus taxi industry when enforcing national legislation.

By the end of the day 15 minibus taxis were impounded and 2 drivers were arrested.

== Timeline ==
=== 3–4 August ===
On 3 August, the first day of the strike, road closures were reported on the N2, M5 highways and Jakes Gerwel Drive. Incidents of looting were reported in the area between Duinefontein and Jakes Gerwel Drive and a bus was set alight at the Nyanga taxi rank. Tens of thousands of commuters were left stranded across the city. A British tourist, Dr Kar Hao Teoh, was shot and killed after unintentionally turning into Ntlangano Crescent, Nyanga.

On 4 August, the second day of the strike, a municipal police officer was shot dead in Nyanga leading to the City of Cape Town to offer a R250,000 reward for information leading to the arrest of the perpetrator. A Golden Arrow bus driver was shot and wounded on same day, the bus he was driving was set alight. Following the 4 August attack on their driver Golden Arrow Bus Services obtained a court interdict against SANTACO affiliated minibus taxi associations to "not intimidate, harass, threaten or interfere with Golden Arrow's operations, its employees and passengers."

The Western Cape Department of Health announced that it was temporarily closing Vanguard Hospital in Bonteheuwel following incidents of staff harassment and attacks by people associated with the strike. Other sporadic acts of violence were reportedly committed by minibus taxi drivers along the N2 highway.

=== 5–7 August ===
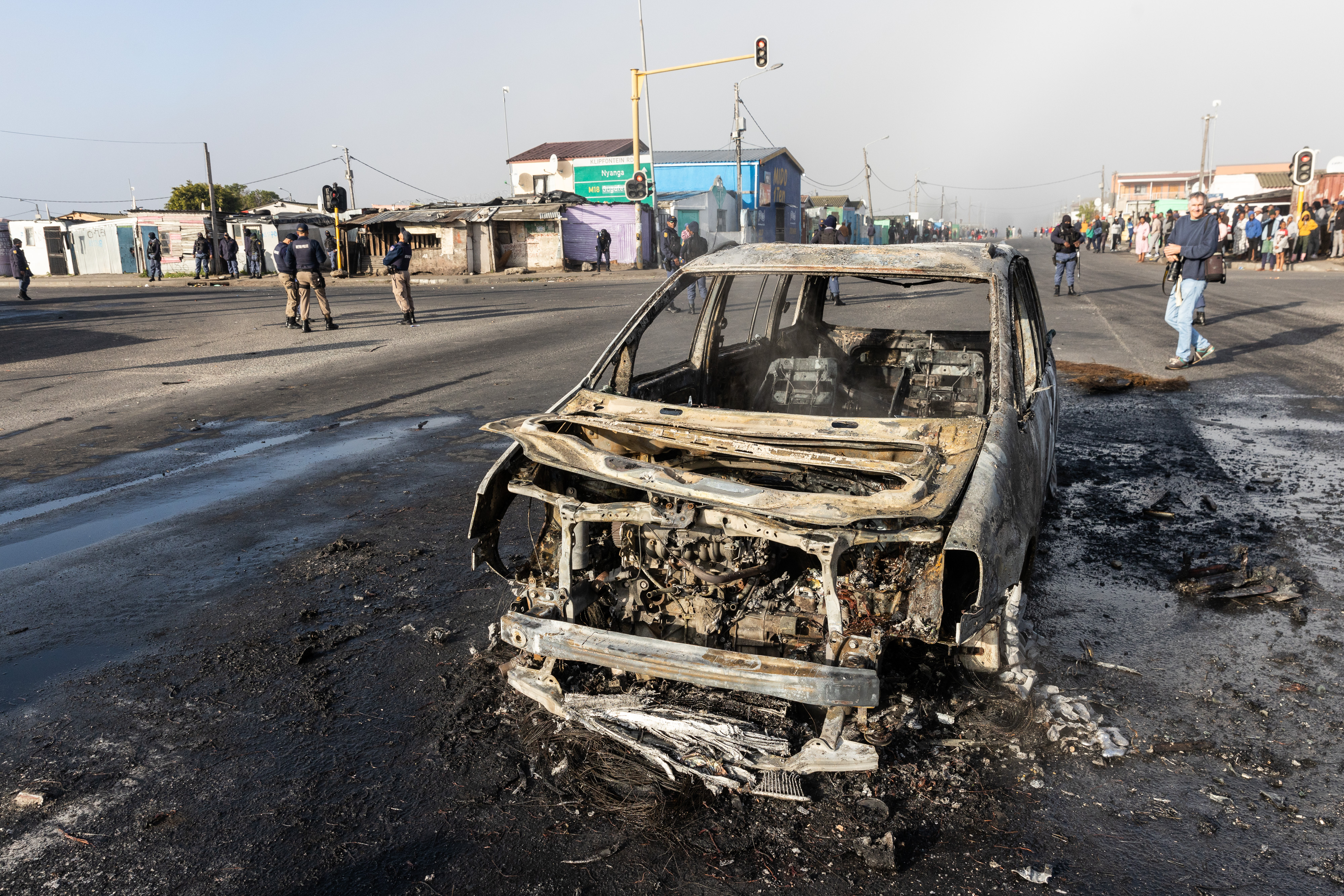
A burnt out vehicle at Ntlangano Crescent/Borcherds Quarry Road in Cape Town on 7 August 2023

One person died in Mfuleni on 5 August when a delivery truck was looted and private security guards pelted with stones.

Talks between SANTACO and the City of Cape Town to resolve the strike collapsed on 6 August. The City blamed additional SANTACO demands that were "not legally implementable" such as the return of impounded taxis without having to pay fines.

On Monday 7 August, the fifth day of the strike, 2 people were shot dead, 35 arrests were made, a City depot in Delft was firebombed, and an additional 4 buses and 3 private vehicles were set alight allegedly by strikers associated with the minibus taxi industry. Protest action was reported in areas around Philippi and Hout Bay.

The Western Cape government stated their intention to pursue legal action against striking taxi operators.

=== 8–9 August ===
On 8 August Transport minister Sindisiwe Chikunga called for the City of Cape Town to release all impounded minibus taxis and accused the implementation of city bylaws as being responsible for inciting the strike. The mayor of Cape Town, Geordin Hill-Lewis, denied Chikunga's accusation and stated that the impounding of all minibus taxis was done entirely in accordance with the National Land Transport Act.

By the 9 August South African Police Minister Bheki Cele stated that a total of 5 people were reported dead, 120 people had been arrested. He also stated that 53 taxis were impounded in law enforcement operations clearing a taxi blockade on 3 August.

=== 10 August ===
The strike came to an end on Thursday, 10 August following late night negotiations between the city and SANTACO. Western Cape Premier Alan Winde stated that SANTACO accepted the same deal offered to it before the strike.

== Impact ==
The City of Cape Town stated that SANTACO failed in its strike objective to get taxis impounded for violating the National Land Transport Act and instead accepted the city's original offer. Specifically that minibus taxis will continue to be impounded for driving without an operating or divers licence, on incorrect taxi routes, or for driving vehicles that were not roadworthy. It was also agreed that negotiations would continue with the taxi operators to compile a list of major offences that vehicles could be impounded for and compile a list of minor offences that vehicles could not be impounded for. SANTACO also agreed not to call for another strike in the middle of the working day.

A total of 5 people were reportedly killed in instances relating to the strike and 120 people arrested. At least 5 buses were torched, allegedly by taxi strikers and over 60 minibus taxis impounded by the authorities. It was reported that criminal elements took advantage of the chaos surrounding the strike action to loot a number of businesses and malls in the Gugulethu, Mfuleni, Nyanga, Khayelitsha and Kraaifontein areas of Cape Town. The provincial education minister stated that the strike significantly impacted schooling for its first few days with over 450,000 students and 17,500 teachers being prevented from getting to schools across Cape Town.

== Followup protests ==
On 3 October 2023 the Economic Freedom Fighters held a protest march and attempted transport shutdown against what they claimed was the City of Cape Town's policy of "unjust taxi impoundments" and called for impounded mini-bus taxis to be immediately released. SANTACO and the African National Congress withdrew from the protest before it took place and instead urged for a peaceful resolution to the issue of taxi impoundments.

== See also ==
- 2021 Cape Town taxi conflict
- Taxi wars in South Africa
