= Crossroads, Western Cape =

Suburb of Cape Town in Western Cape, South Africa

Crossroads
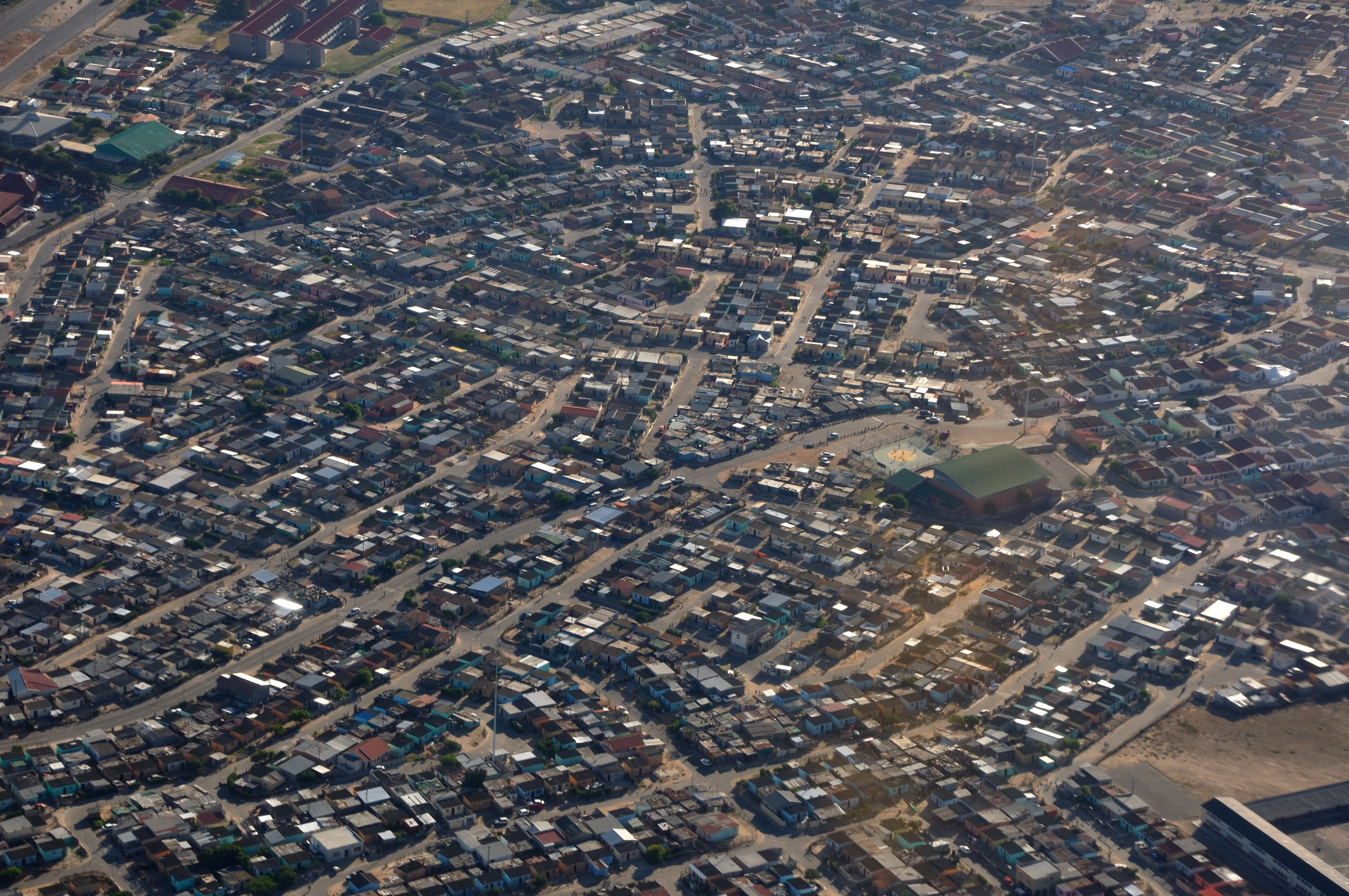
- Aerial view of Crossroads

- Location within Western Cape Location within South Africa
- Coordinates: 33°59′S 18°35′E
- Country: South Africa
- Province: Western Cape
- Municipality: City of Cape Town

Area
  - Total: 2.35 km^{2} (0.91 sq mi)

Population (2011)
  - Total: 36,043
  - Density: 15,300/km^{2} (39,700/sq mi)

Racial makeup (2011)
  - Black African: 96.7%
  - Coloured: 2.9%
  - Indian/Asian: 0.1%
  - White: 0.1%
  - Other: 0.2%

First languages (2011)
  - Xhosa: 89.0%
  - Afrikaans: 3.4%
  - English: 3.2%
  - Sotho: 1.4%
  - Other: 3.0%
- Time zone: UTC+2 (SAST)
- PO box: 9334

Crossroads is a high-density township in the Western Cape, South Africa.

It is situated near Cape Town International Airport and borders Nyanga, Philippi, Heideveld, Gugulethu and Mitchells Plain. Crossroads is one of greater Cape Town's largest townships.

== History ==
The establishment of Crossroads as a settlement began in the 1970s when workers from a nearby farm were told to leave and move to 'the crossroads'. By the year of 1977 a survey indicated that a total of 18,000 people were living at Crossroads.

An added motivation for the initial settlers in what was then unsettled Cape Flats Dune Strandveld was the opportunity for families to build individual, more respectable homes than the hostels of Gugulethu allowed for. Since the Apartheid authorities considered the settlement temporary, orders to evict and dismantle it were issued in 1975. In 1978, Prime Minister P.W. Botha had led a campaign to demolish Crossroads. Amid significant opposition, Botha and his minister for Black affairs Piet Koornhof agreed to "indefinitely delay" the demolitions.

Opposition came from Men's Committee and a Women's Committee that had been formed to oppose the order as well as the Black Sash. The Women's Committee was particularly successful at organising and gaining support from within and from outside of the community. In 1978 Crossroads was declared an 'emergency camp' thereby obliging the City Council to supply basic municipal services. Once Crossroads had been declared a legal settlement by the government they began to focus on dismantling the rapidly growing informal settlements in the surrounding area. The government's focus on destroying these settlements was driven by a desire to neutralise the threat the government faced in the wake of 1976 Soweto uprisings.

From this group of activists the Development Action Group was established in 1986. A non-governmental organisation that a former mayor of Cape Town, Nomaindia Mfeketo, used to work for prior to becoming mayor.

Although the 'Save Crossroads' campaign was successful violence broke out within the community due to a feud between supporters of the then head of the residents committee Johnson Ngxobongwana, and those who accused him of favouritism and rewarding his henchmen.

From 1983 onwards the violence in Crossroads began to spread into the neighboring areas of KTC and Nyanga. Older Crossroads residents resented the rising influence of the United Democratic Front (UDF) and in response a group of these residents formed an organisation known as the 'Witdoeke' (white armbands) and allied with the police to suppress the UDF. By March 1986 some areas of Crossroads had become 'no-go areas' for the South African Police and Army.

The government used the Witdoeke to clear areas of KTC and Crossroads of UDF influence. The Witdoeke attacked neighbouring townships and set fire to all the shanty settlements in old Crossroads thereby leaving 60,000 people homeless. As a result, some residents moved to a tented town near Site C in Khayelitsha to avoid the violence.
