= Philippi Horticultural =

Suburb of Cape Town

Philippi Horticultural Area
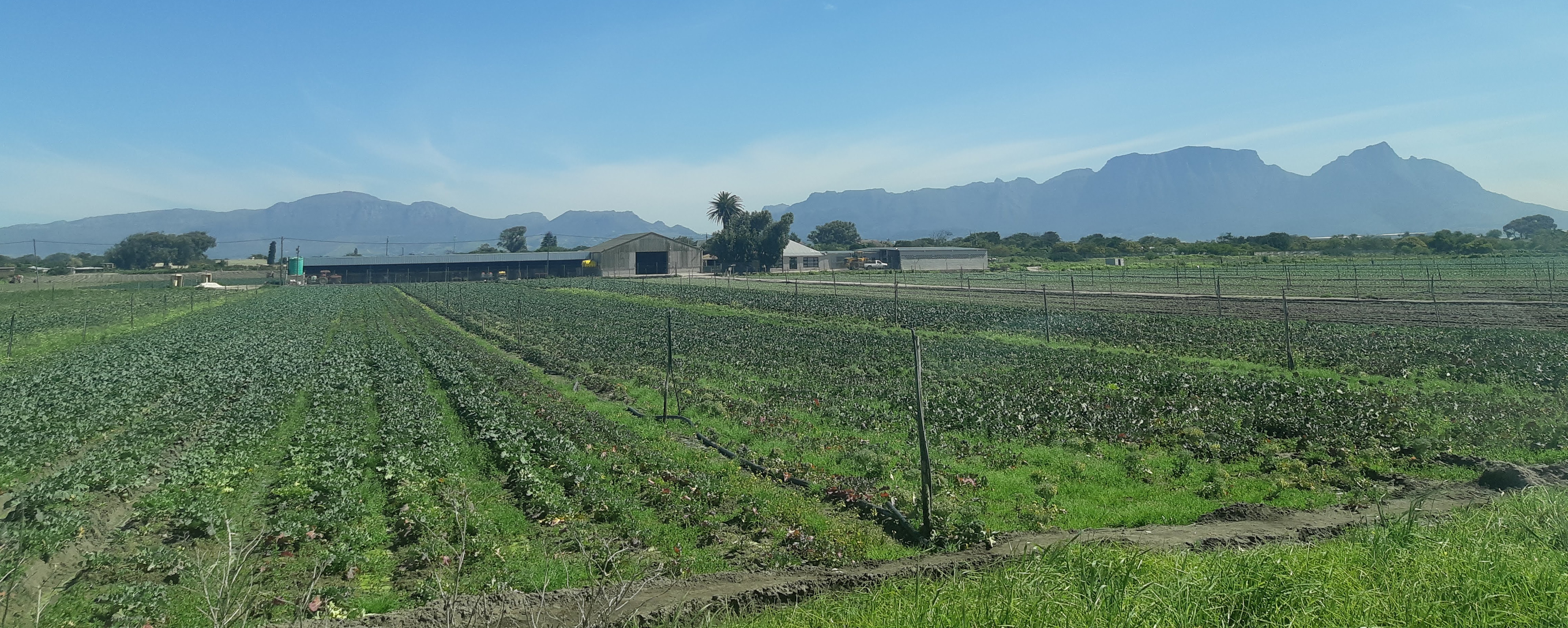

- Location within Western Cape Location within South Africa Location within Africa
- Coordinates: 34°1′S 18°33′E-34.02819677014453, 18.55411447417612
- Country: South Africa
- Province: Western Cape
- Municipality: City of Cape Town
- Main Place: Philippi

Area
  - Total: 34.21 km^{2} (13.21 sq mi)

Population (2011)
  - Total: 6,618
  - Density: 193.5/km^{2} (501.0/sq mi)
- Time zone: UTC+2 (SAST)
- Postal code (street): 7750
- PO box: 7781
- Area code: 021

The Philippi Horticultural area is a large semi-rural area of Philippi on the Cape Flats region of the City of Cape Town Metropolitan Municipality, in the Western Cape province of South Africa.

The horticultural area is sparsely populated compared to the surrounding city and contains many farms. The 2011 national census recorded 6,618 residents living in the area with an additional 2,961 residents living in the Knole Park community in the central western part of the area.

== History ==
Prior to European settlement in the 1600s nomadic Khoi and San used the land for grazing their animals and hunting for food. The first recorded community of local residents in the Philippi area was in 1833 during which time it was known as "Die Duine" (The Dunes).

The Philippi Germans arrived in Cape Town (most of whom originated from the Lüneburger Heide region of Germany) in three groups between 1860 and 1883, and became known for their ability to grow vegetables in the sandy soils of the Cape Flats.

== Economy ==
The Philippi Horticultural Area provides up to 80% of Cape Town's fresh produce. It hosts 38 farms, 20 of which focus on the cultivation of horticultural products and 11 on livestock and animal products.

Continuing urban development within the horticultural area has been controversial amid concerns that it will have a negative impact on food sustainability within Cape Town broadly.

The area's agricultural activities generate R484 million of economic output annually.

== Developments ==
In the 2010s, a voluntary organization was formed by Nazeer Sonday named the Philippi Horticultural Area (PHA) Food & Farming Campaign in order to protect the horticultural farmlands and wetlands of the suburb from urban development and mining.

The organization believes that the absorption of water into the Cape Flats Aquifer (which supplies water to much of Cape Town) is especially effective within the horticultural area, as the rest of the land above the aquifer has been affected by urbanization, and is therefore campaigning for parts of the Philippi Horticultural Area (PHA) to remain designated as a horticultural farming and wetland area over being rezoned into an urban residential area. They also believe that development in the area may affect farming and food security for the city of Cape Town.

In 2011, a proposal was made, named the Oakland City Development project, to develop a new township and mining area within the south-eastern part of the PHA (Schaapkraal). Plans included creating housing for 15000 families as well as industrial and commercial properties. Small scale farmers in the area opposed the project. In February 2020, a Western Cape High Court judge had ruled that neither the Western Cape Government nor the City of Cape Town had "properly considered the impact a housing development would have on the Cape Flats Aquifer" and therefore ordered a reconsideration of the impact the Oakland City project may have on the area in the context of water scarcity and climate change.

In September 2023, an application to do mining in part of the PHA by Ardagh Glass Packaging (formerly Consol Glass) was rejected.
