= Codeta =

Codeta may refer to:

- Cape Organisation for the Democratic Taxi Association (also known as Congress of Democratic Taxi Association), a South African taxi mother body
- Gelotia, a genus of jumping spider
