= Cape Organisation for the Democratic Taxi Association =

South African taxi operator association

- Formation: 8 March 1992
- Merger of: Western Cape Black Taxi Association; Lagunya Taxi Association
- Type: "Mother body" taxi association
- Headquarters: Khayelitsha, Western Cape
- Region served: Western Cape, South Africa
- Website: codeta.co.za

The Cape Organisation for the Democratic Taxi Association (Codeta), also sometimes called the Congress of Democratic Taxi Association(s) or Congress for Democratic Taxi Associations, is an umbrella body for minibus taxi operators in the Western Cape province of South Africa. Formed in 1992, it is one of the two major taxi associations in the Western Cape, and has frequently been embroiled in violent conflict with its primary competitor, the Cape Amalgamated Taxi Association (CATA), since the latter broke away from Codeta in the mid-1990s. Codeta, like CATA, is a member of the Western Cape provincial arm of the South African National Taxi Council.

== Operations ==
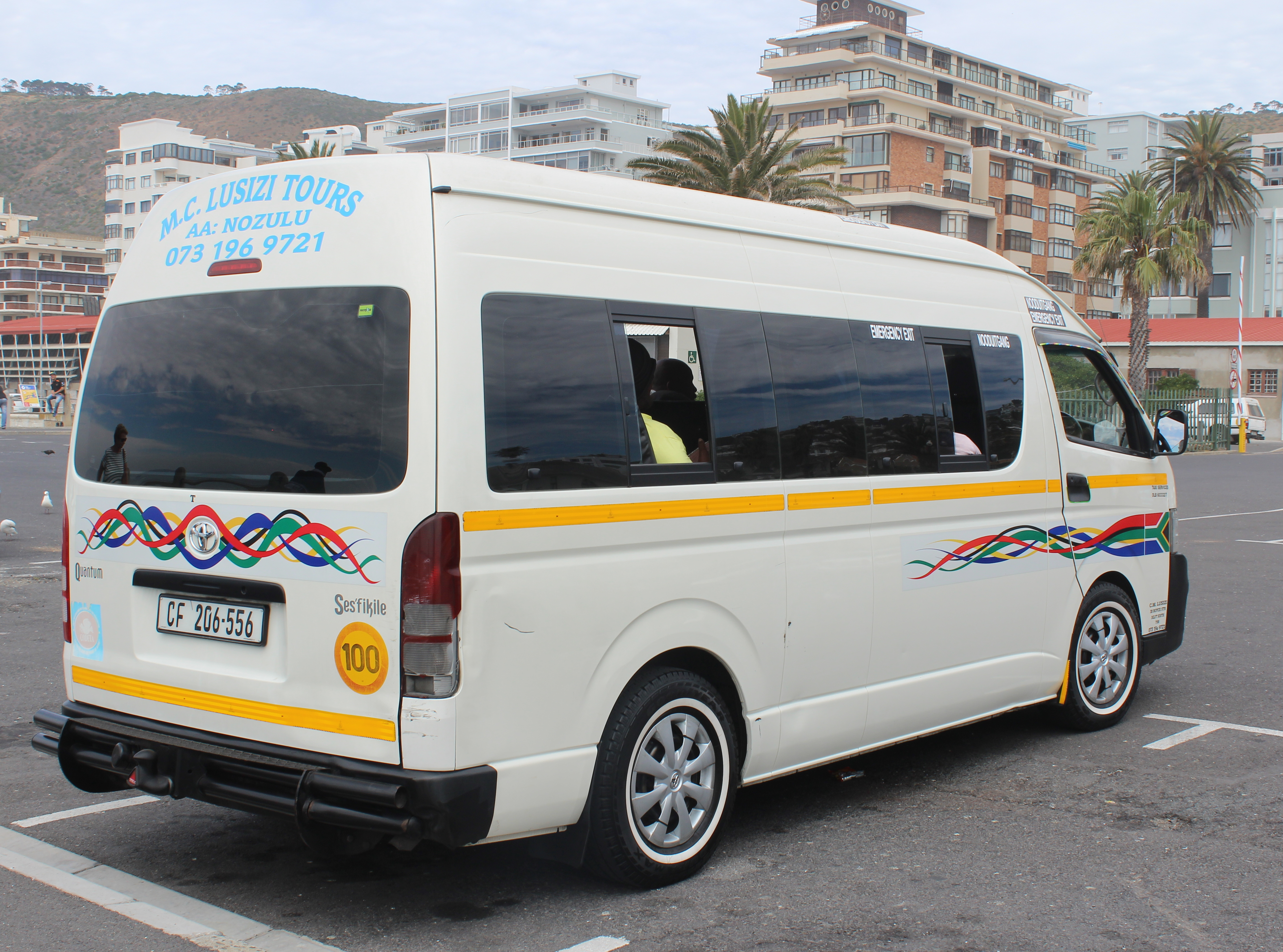
A Codeta-affiliated taxi in Cape Town, identifiable by the Codeta logo sticker (left of the license plate).

Codeta is one of several "mother body" taxi associations in South Africa: umbrella bodies, typically associated with a particular region, to which local taxi associations belong as affiliates. Individual local or long-distance taxi operators in turn belong to the local affiliates. As diplomat Jackie Dugard writes, mother bodies have become "political and economic agents in their own right since 1994." The mother bodies control various ranks and routes, which their members are able to operate on and for which they set the fare. Much of the conflict between different mother bodies is therefore rooted in commercial competition over control of lucrative or strategically important routes. For example, routes originating at the Belville public transport interchange in northern Cape Town have frequently been flashpoints in Codeta–CATA violence.

As of 2005, Codeta controlled 14 short- and long-distance routes, primarily originating at the rank, known as Kuwait, in the Site C subdivision of Khayelitsha. By 2012, it ran 16 routes out of the Kuwait rank alone. Its headquarters, and reportedly its strongest base, are also in Khayelitsha. In the same year, membership fees for its affiliates were between R20,000 and R30,000, and there are also "rank fees" charged daily per vehicle for the right to operate out of Codeta-controlled taxi ranks.

=== MyCiti N2 Express ===
Codeta is a shareholder in a joint venture, called N2 Express, which operated the MyCiti bus rapid transit N2 Express service to Khayelitsha and Mitchells Plain between July 2014 and May 2019, when the service was halted amid an apparently insoluble dispute among shareholders including Codeta. In 2021, the City of Cape Town announced that it planned to sign a new agreement with the N2 Express vehicle, which would allow the service to return; but in January 2022, the Codeta leader who had been delegated to sign the agreement on Codeta's behalf was killed in a suspected murder.

== History ==
=== 1992: Formation ===
Codeta was formed on 8 March 1992 by a merger between the Lagunya Taxi Association (Lagunya is a portmanteau of Langa, Gugulethu and Nyanga) and the Western Cape Black Taxi Association (Webta). For several years, Lagunya and Webta had been engaged in violent conflict in Cape Peninsula townships. Their merger was the result of mediated negotiations, with community leaders taking advantage of the country's political situation – negotiations to end apartheid were ongoing – to urge the associations to reconcile. At its establishment, Codeta represented thirteen taxi associations, and its first executive committee of Codeta comprised sixteen members, both from Lagunya and from Webta. Its major aims were to minimise rivalry and violence in the Western Cape taxi industry, and to improve taxi operators' bargaining position in anticipated negotiations with government over the future of the industry.

=== 1994: Breakaway of CATA ===
Although a relative period of calm followed Codeta's formation, there were residual internal tensions, primarily related to a perception by former Webta members that Codeta favoured former Lagunya members. In 1993 or 1994, a group of former Webta members, led by Simon Booi and Victor Sam, broke away from Codeta and formed a rival mother body, CATA. The breakaway group's grievances included allegations of corruption and misappropriation of funds by the Codeta executive, and the perception that Codeta was aligned to the African National Congress (while, similarly, Codeta members believed that CATA was aligned to the Pan Africanist Congress). When the Independent Electoral Commission subsidised the transport of voters to polling stations during the 1994 general election – South Africa's first democratic and non-racial election – some members felt that the Codeta executive had not fairly distributed the funds among members. And during the same period, some members felt that the executive did not adequately address their concerns about the construction of a new taxi deck at the Cape Town railway station, a major commuter hub.

The eruption of violence between Codeta and CATA was apparently almost immediate, as CATA embarked on "an expansionist drive," competing for control of Codeta's routes, ranks, and members. Frequently cited as a key point in the history of the rivalry between the associations is a political rally in October 1994 in Khayelitsha during which several CATA members were shot dead. CATA had been invited to attend the rally without bringing weapons, and suspected that the invitation had been a trap arranged by Codeta. Further defections of Codeta members to CATA also contributed to the conflict, and, according to commentators, Codeta was significantly weakened during CATA's rise.

=== 1996: First agreement ===
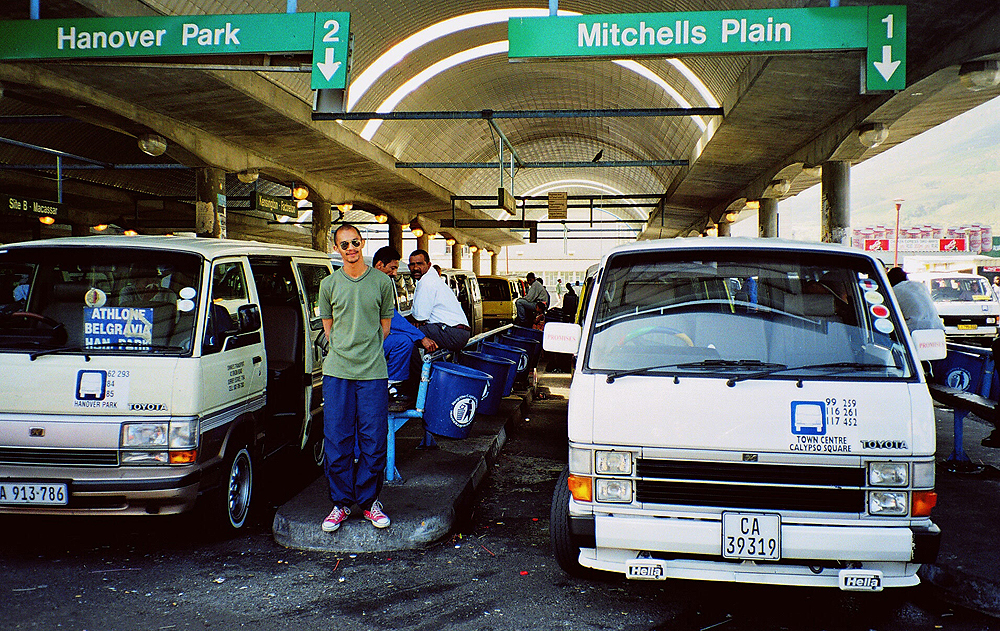
Taxis bound for the Cape Flats at the Cape Town railway station, 2001.

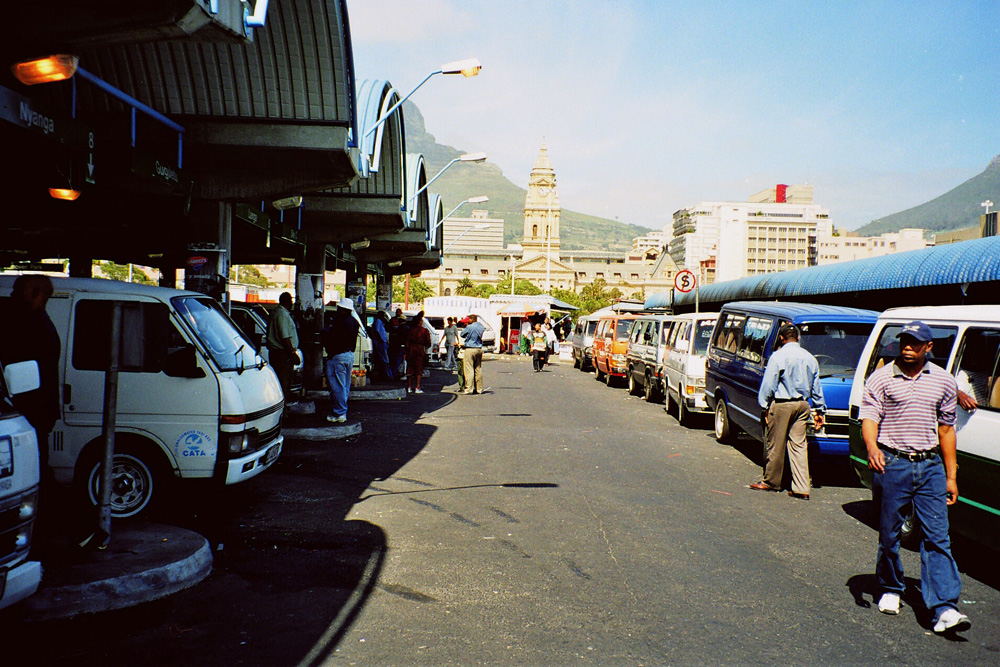
Cape Town station taxi deck, 2001.

In 1996, Codeta and CATA signed an agreement, facilitated by the provincial transport department and ordered by the high court, over the control of routes in the Western Cape. Codeta was allocated Khayelitsha and most areas south of the R300, including Khayelitsha, while CATA was allocated areas north of the R300. However, according to a 2005 commission of inquiry, the agreement did not succeed in reconciling the associations, and it contributed to a situation in which not just routes but also whole suburbs effectively became the associations' respective turf. The 1996 agreement was the first of several agreements signed between Codeta and CATA, the enforcement of which has rarely turned out to be sustainable over a long period of time.

=== 2005: Commission of inquiry ===
In April 2005, the Premier of the Western Cape, Ebrahim Rasool, established a commission of inquiry, chaired by Dumisa Ntsebeza, to investigate taxi violence in the Western Cape, after Codeta and CATA engaged in violent conflict over control of the taxi routes to and from the new Cape Gate shopping centre.

== Role in taxi violence ==
Like CATA, Codeta has been implicated in the hiring of iimbovane (English: ants), or hitmen, to assassinate enemies. Organised crime has played a role in the taxi violence, especially on the Cape Flats, where Codeta is based, and especially since the late 1990s, when taxi associations began to solicit protection from local gangs. Codeta members have also been linked to vigilantism, especially in Khayelitsha. Violence between Codeta and CATA most recently broke out in a 2021 turf war over the B97 route between Belville and Paarl, after in 2020 some CATA drivers on the route defected to Codeta.

In a slightly different kind of conflict, Codeta has been implicated in violence not against members of rival taxi associations but against operators of alternative forms of public transport. Intimidation and violence against Golden Arrow bus drivers has been ongoing sporadically since the early 1990s, with taxi operators objecting to Golden Arrow operating on their routes and sometimes undercutting their fares.

== Leadership ==
Vusumzi Lennox Miselo was president of Codeta between 2008 and 2020, when he was replaced by Dali Speelman in an acting capacity.

== See also ==
- Goldstone Commission
- Mount Ayliff Christmas Day Massacre
