= Philippi, Western Cape =

Suburb of Cape Town

Philippi
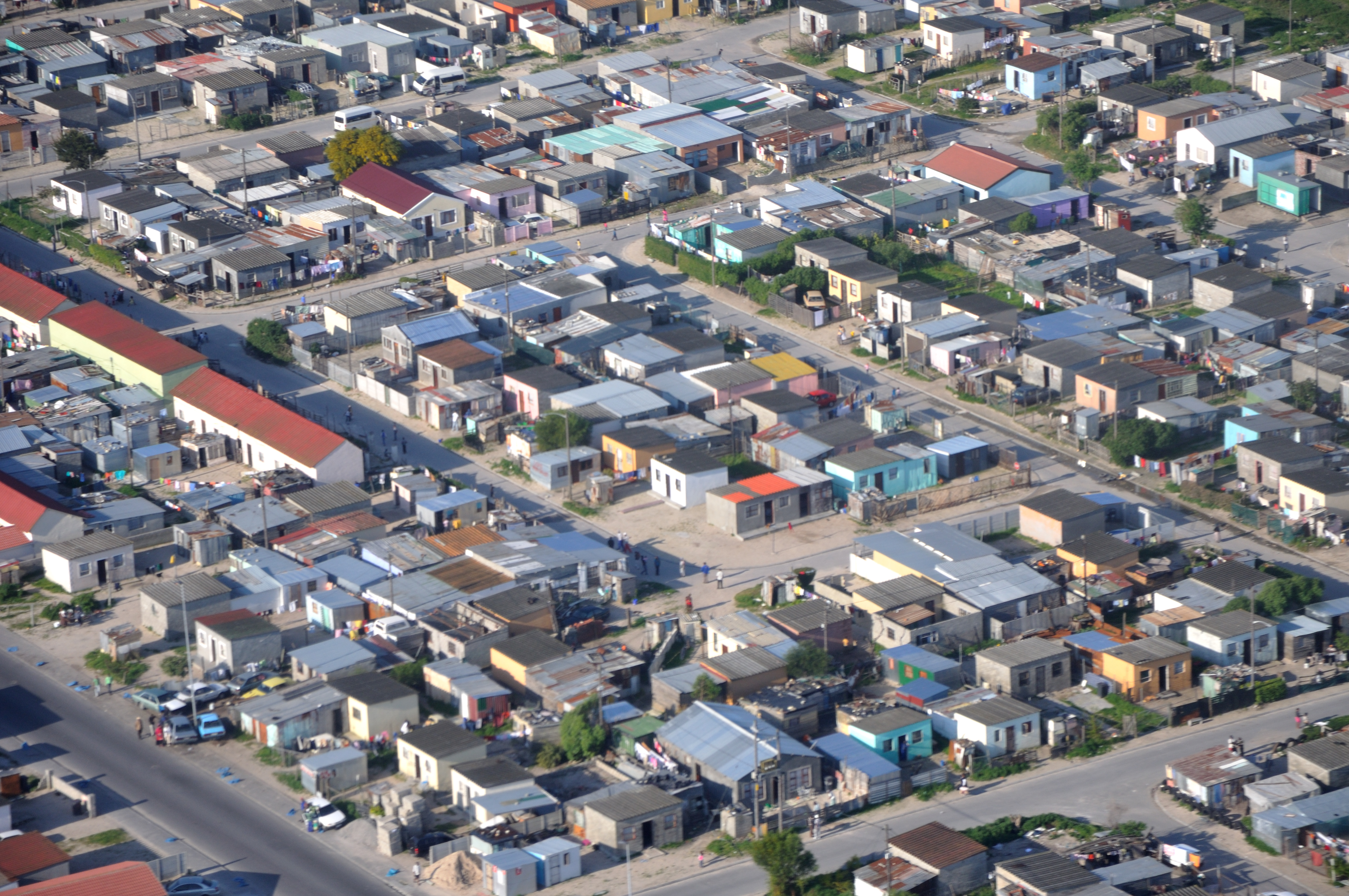
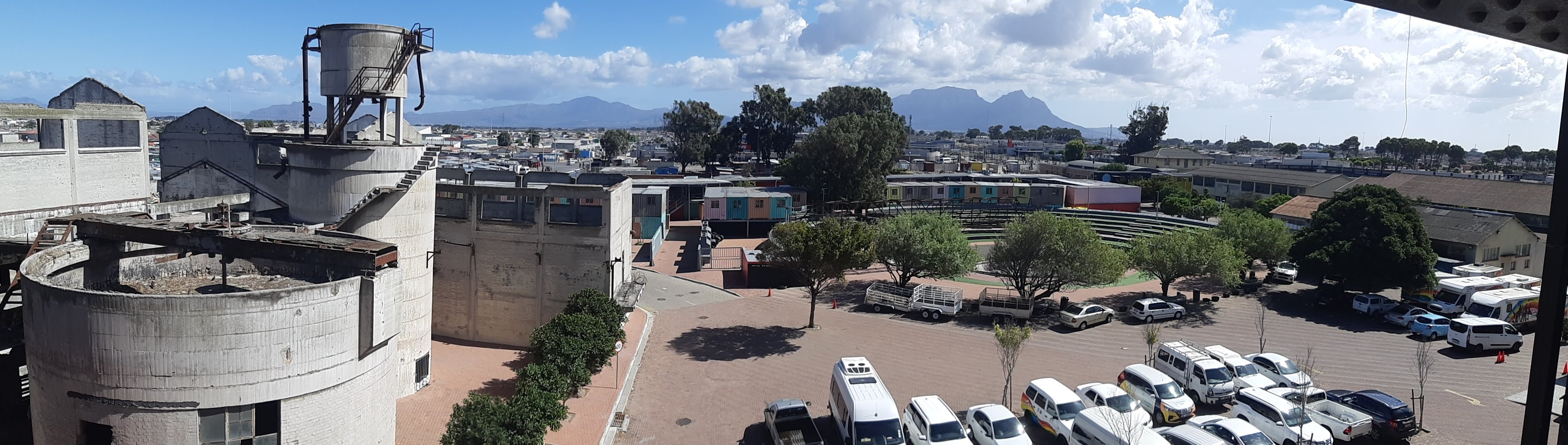
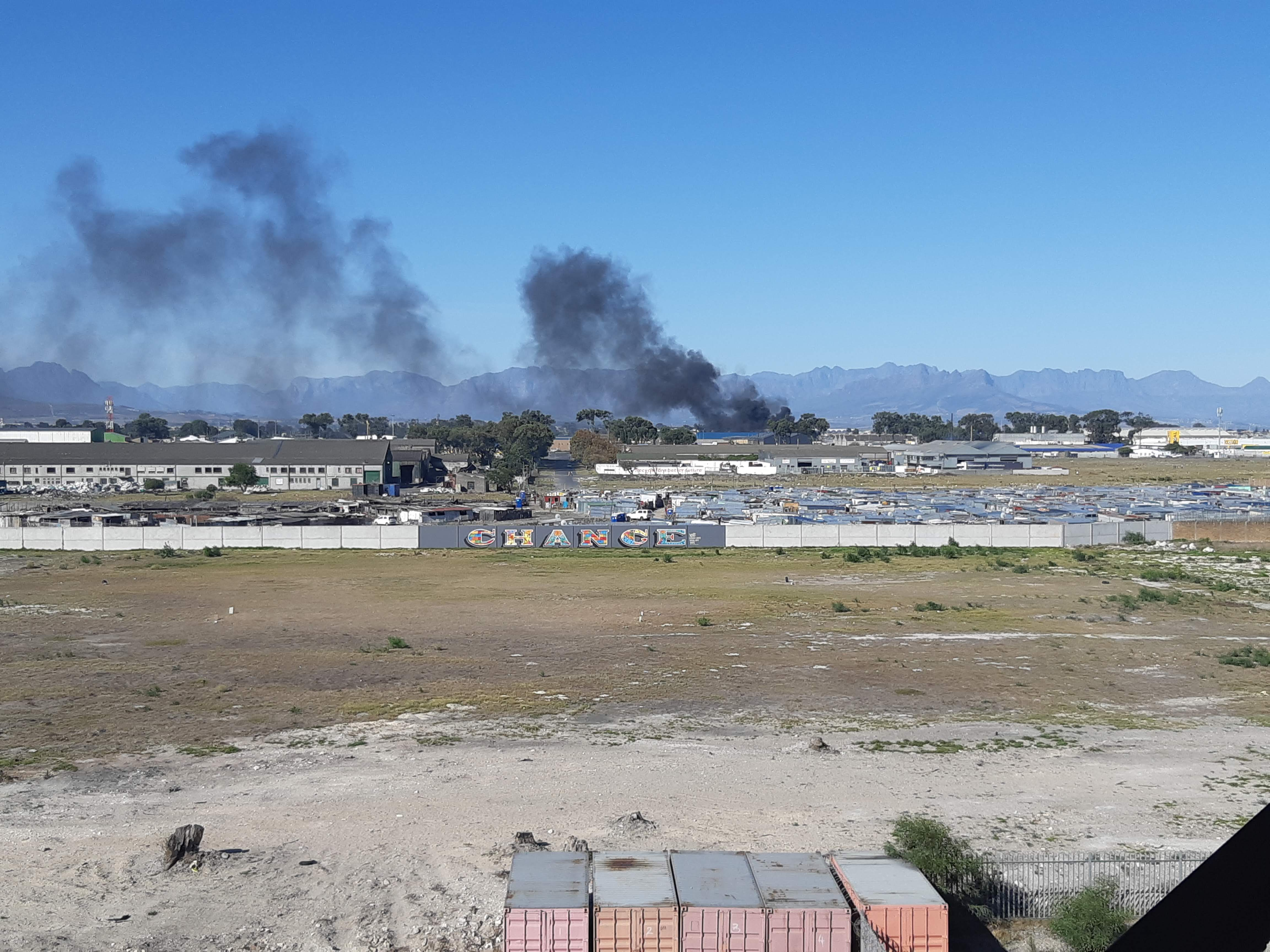
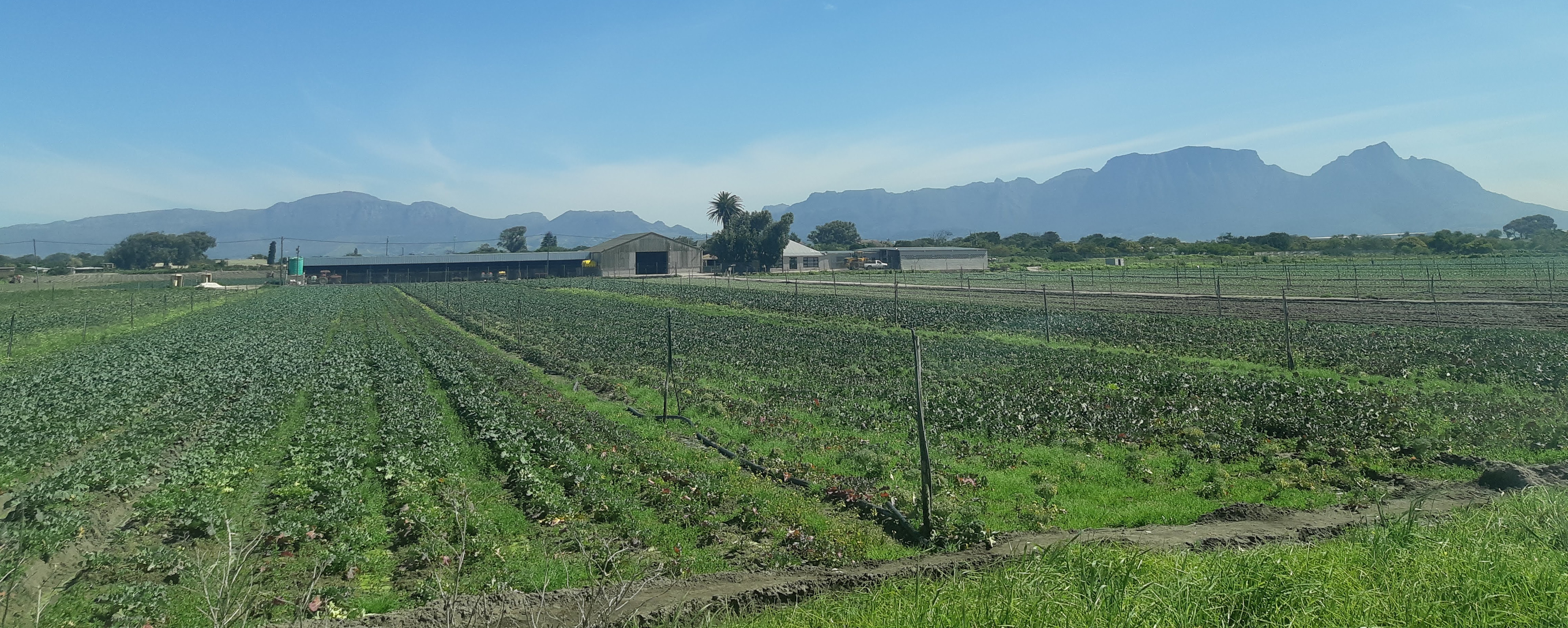

- Location within Western Cape Location within South Africa Location within Africa
- Coordinates: 34°1′S 18°33′E
- Country: South Africa
- Province: Western Cape
- Municipality: City of Cape Town
- Main Place: Cape Town

Area
  - Total: 34.21 km^{2} (13.21 sq mi)

Population (2011)
  - Total: 200,603
  - Density: 5,864/km^{2} (15,190/sq mi)
- Time zone: UTC+2 (SAST)
- Postal code (street): 7750
- PO box: 7781
- Area code: 021

Philippi is a large urban and semi-rural area in Cape Town's Cape Flats region, in the Western Cape, South Africa.

It comprises the Philippi Horticultural Area to the west, which is sparsely populated compared to the surrounding city and contains many farms. This area produces around 80% of Cape Town's freshproduce, and generates around half a billion rand's worth of economic output per annum.

It also includes the suburbs of Brown's Farm, Philippi East and Samora Machel located within its eastern half. The neighbourhoods of Gugulethu and Nyanga are located to its north.

== History ==
The nomadic Khoi pastoralists once used the land for grazing their animals and hunting for food. The first community of local residents was recorded in 1833 during which time it was known as "Die Duine" (The Dunes). The Philippi Germans arrived in Cape Town in three groups between 1860 and 1883, and became known for their ability to grow vegetables in the sandy soils of the Cape Flats.

Until the 1970s the area was mainly used for grazing with a few farms located in the area. Phillipi was established in the late 1970s after black farm workers were banned from a local farm.

As resistance to apartheid grew in the 1980s Philippi increasingly became a place of refuge from the political unrest in the former homelands. Additional residents came to live in Philippi when farms in Mitchell's Plain were eliminated due to urban sprawl.

At least half of Cape Town's vegetables are grown in the Philippi Horticultural Area, despite being surrounded by residential suburbs which include townships, informal settlements and century-old neighborhoods.

The ability to grow produce is greatly aided by the fact that the area sits on top of a large aquifer. The Germans developed farming methods over three generations to adapt to the extreme weather conditions and sandy soil. One of these practices was no-till farming. Its use is being reintroduced and encouraged today.

== Economy ==
The Philippi Horticultural Area provides up to 80% of Cape Town's fresh produce. Continuing urban development within the horticultural area has been controversial amid concerns that it will have a negative impact on food sustainability within Cape Town broadly. The area's agricultural activities generate R484 million of economic output annually.

Philippi is seen by government and businesses as ideal for certain business related developments. Philippi is slated for a number of large developments including the 'Philippi Mini-City'.
