= 2021 Cape Town taxi conflict =

2021 violent taxi conflict

- Part of Taxi wars in South Africa
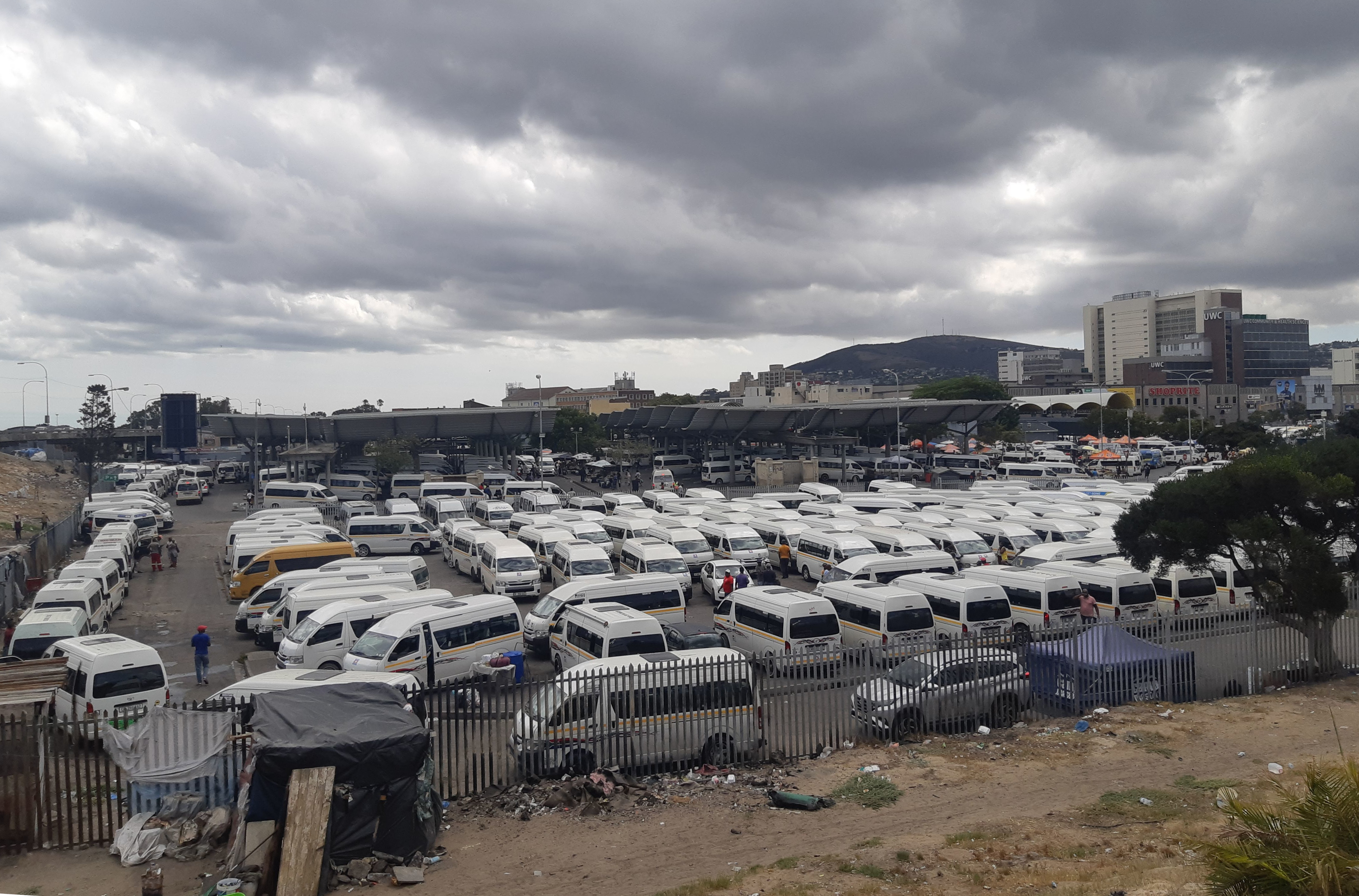
- Control over taxi commuter traffic between the Bellville Taxi rank (pictured) and Paarl was the cause of the violence.
- Location: multiple locations across the City of Cape Town, South Africa
- Date: January 2021 - August 2021
- Target: Minibus taxi drivers
- Weapon: various firearms
- Deaths: 83
- Injuries: multiple
- Victims: Taxi operators, drivers, commuters, pedestrians, and regular bus drivers.
- Motive: Conflict between minibus taxi operators Cata and Codeta for control over lucrative taxi routes

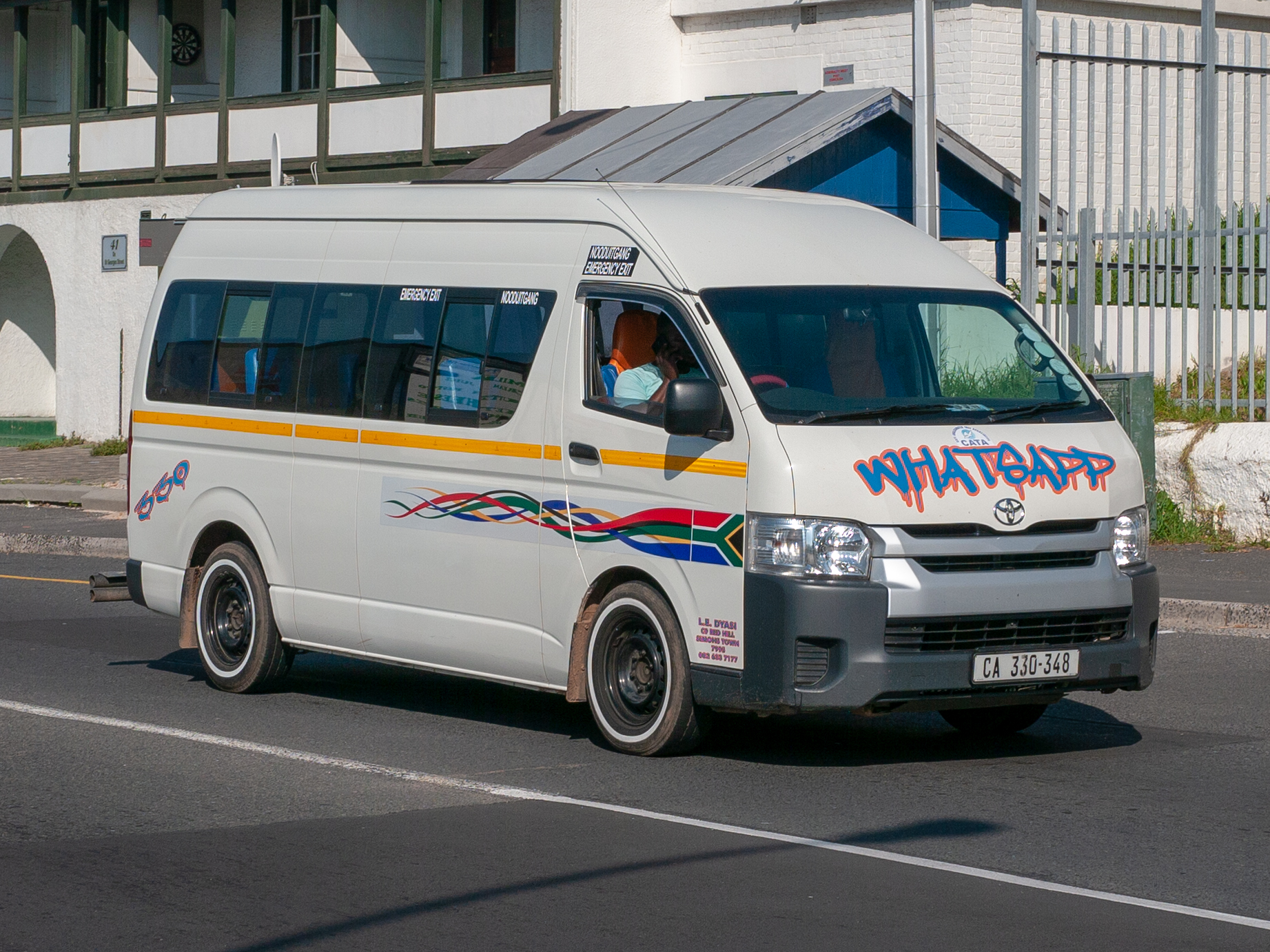
A CATA minibus taxi in Cape Town. The blue and white CATA logo is visible in centre of the vehicle's hood.

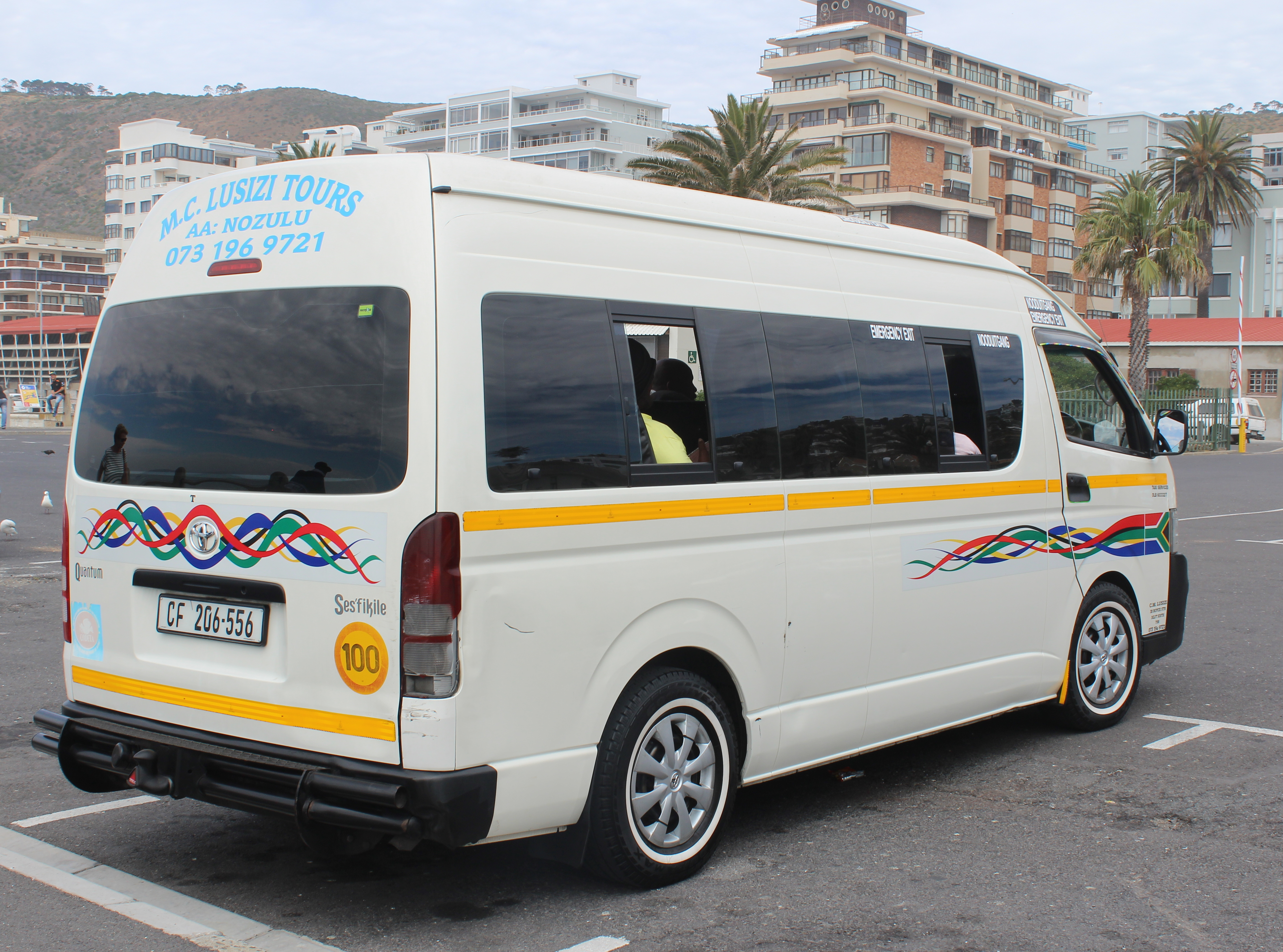
A CODETA minibus taxi in Cape Town. The pink and blue CODETA logo is visible on the back of the vehicle to the left of the number plate.

The 2021 Cape Town taxi conflict was a violent turf war between the minibus taxi operators Cape Amalgamated Taxi Association (CATA) and Congress of Democratic Taxi Association (CODETA) over lucrative taxi routes in Cape Town, South Africa. The conflict was part of a long running series of conflicts that are part of the ongoing taxi wars in South Africa.

The conflict picked up in intensity in July 2021 over the B97 taxi route between Bellville and Paarl. The spike in taxi violence resulted in thousands of people being unable to get to their jobs resulting in pay cuts, job losses and economic hardship. Western Cape Transport MEC Daylin Mitchell stated that 22 murders and 29 attempted murders resulting from taxi violence were recorded between the start of July and July 16 2021. As of 23 July 2021 a total of 83 taxi conflict related deaths in the Western Cape were recorded since the start of 2021. A total of 24 people had died in the conflict in the month of July 2021.

In response to the violence the Western Cape provincial government temporarily closed the B97 taxi route for two months in an effort to prevent further violence. South African National Defence Force personnel were deployed alongside South African Police Service personnel to help secure affected transport routes.

The July spike in violence coincided with large scale rioting in the provinces of KwaZulu-Natal and Gauteng.

On 2 August both CATA and CODETA met with national Transport Minister Fikile Mbalula to mediate an end to the conflict after which Mbalula announced that a truce agreement had been reached. The agreement stipulated that should violence break out again, then all affected mini-bus taxi routes would be closed for a period to be determined by the Department of Transport.

== See also ==
- 2023 Western Cape taxi strike
