= Taxi wars in South Africa =

1980s and onwards taxi turf wars

- Date: late 1980s-present
- Location: South Africa

Parties
Cape Organisation for the Democratic Taxi Association (CODETA)	Inkatha Freedom Party	African National Congress
Cape Amalgamated Taxi Association (CATA)	Khumalo Gang/LGCZ (IFP)	Self-Defence Units (SDU-ANC)
South African National Taxi Council (SANTC)	Self-Defence Units (SDU-IFP)	Mandela United Football Club

The term taxi war refer to the turf wars fought between taxi associations and individual minibus taxi drivers in South Africa from the late 1980s to the present day.

The multi-billion rand minibus taxi industry carries over 60% of South Africa's commuters. Generally speaking, these commuters are all of the lower economic class. Wealthy individuals drive their own cars for safety and convenience. The industry is almost entirely made up of sixteen-seater commuter Toyota Quantum buses, which are sometimes unsafe or not roadworthy. Minibus taxi drivers are well known for their disregard for the rules of the road and their proclivity for dangerously overloading their vehicles with passengers.

Due to an effectively unregulated market and the fierceness of competition for passengers and lucrative routes, taxi operators banded together to form local and national associations. These associations soon exhibited mafia-like tactics, including the hiring of hitmen and all-out gang warfare. Taxi associations have also engaged in anti-competitive price fixing. Notable taxi operators include the Cape Amalgamated Taxi Association (CATA) and Cape Organisation for the Democratic Taxi Association (CODETA) in Cape Town.

== Causes ==
Prior to 1987, the South African taxi industry was highly regulated and controlled, with Black people being refused permits under apartheid laws. Sixteen-seater minibuses were illegal to operate as taxis. After 1987, the industry was rapidly deregulated, leading to an influx of new minibus taxi operators keen to make money from the high demand for their service. Because the taxi industry was largely unregulated and the official regulating bodies were deeply corrupt, the industry quickly became criminal in nature.

The economic triggers for the wars were intertwined with political unrest around the time of the abolition of apartheid in 1994. Commuters were often the target of political violence not necessarily related to the taxi industry itself. Often, the warring factions involved were from opposing political parties, such as the Inkatha Freedom Party and African National Congress. In the years leading up to the end of apartheid, the National Party government is believed to have actively encouraged this violence so as to destabilise its political opposition. For example, in 1998, thirteen police officers were charged with complicity in taxi violence.

== Timeline ==
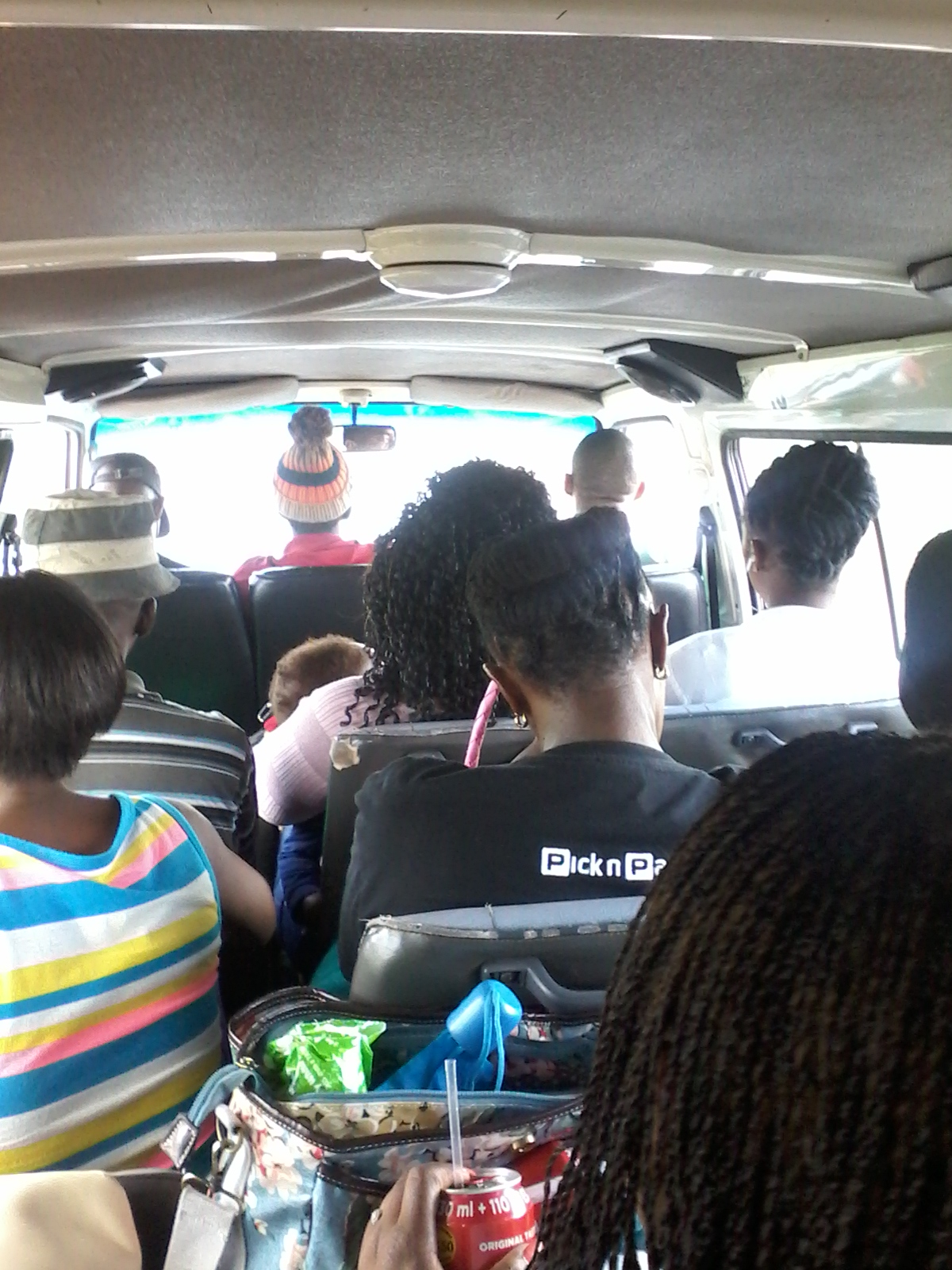
Passengers packed inside a taxi.

=== Pre-1977: State-owned monopoly ===
The Motor Carrier Transportation Act of 1930 prohibited transportation of goods and passengers by road for profit without a permit from the Local Road Transportation Board (LRTB). The South African transport industry was essentially a state monopoly held by the South African Transport Service (SATS). Taxi owners operating outside the jurisdiction of the LRTB were operating illegally. These taxi operators started banding together into local informal associations.

=== 1977–1987: Impetus towards deregulation ===
Along with growing political pressure, the 1976 Soweto Riots prompted the apartheid government to form a commission of inquiry into the transport industry. In 1977, the Van Breda Commission of Inquiry recommended freer competition and less regulation in the industry. The commission realised that the transport industry was becoming highly politicised and that it was no longer in the government's best interests to participate in the transport market.

In 1979, the first national association of black taxi drivers was established: the South African Black Taxi Association (SABTA). In the years to come, rival organisations, such as the South African Long Distance Taxi Association (SALDTA), would be formed. This body, along with other political bodies at the time, started putting pressure on the government to deregulate the industry. Impetus towards a free market economy grew stronger in the late 1980s.

=== 1987–1996: Deregulation ===
The White Paper on Transport Policy, tabled in January 1987, in conjunction with the Transport Deregulation Act of 1988, effectively deregulated South Africa's entire taxi industry overnight, making minibus taxis legal. This change gave birth to the taxi industry as it exists in its current form. The permit-issuing process was rife with corruption; permits were essentially given away to favoured applicants. For all intents and purposes, there was no control whatsoever. In the absence of official controls, the now-growing taxi organisations began using their influence to make more money to intimidate competitors. The authorities did little or nothing to stop the violence.

=== 1994–1999: Post-apartheid violence ===
In contrast to expectations, taxi-related violence intensified after the fall of apartheid. In 1995, the government established the National Taxi Task Team (NTTT) to arrive at a solution to the violence. In 1996, the NTTT's first report recommended the immediate re-regulation of the taxi industry. However, the government's attempts at re-regulation were actively resisted by the now extremely powerful "mother" organisations that controlled the taxi industry, leading to an escalation of violence between 1998 and 1999.

=== 1999–2010: Recapitalisation ===
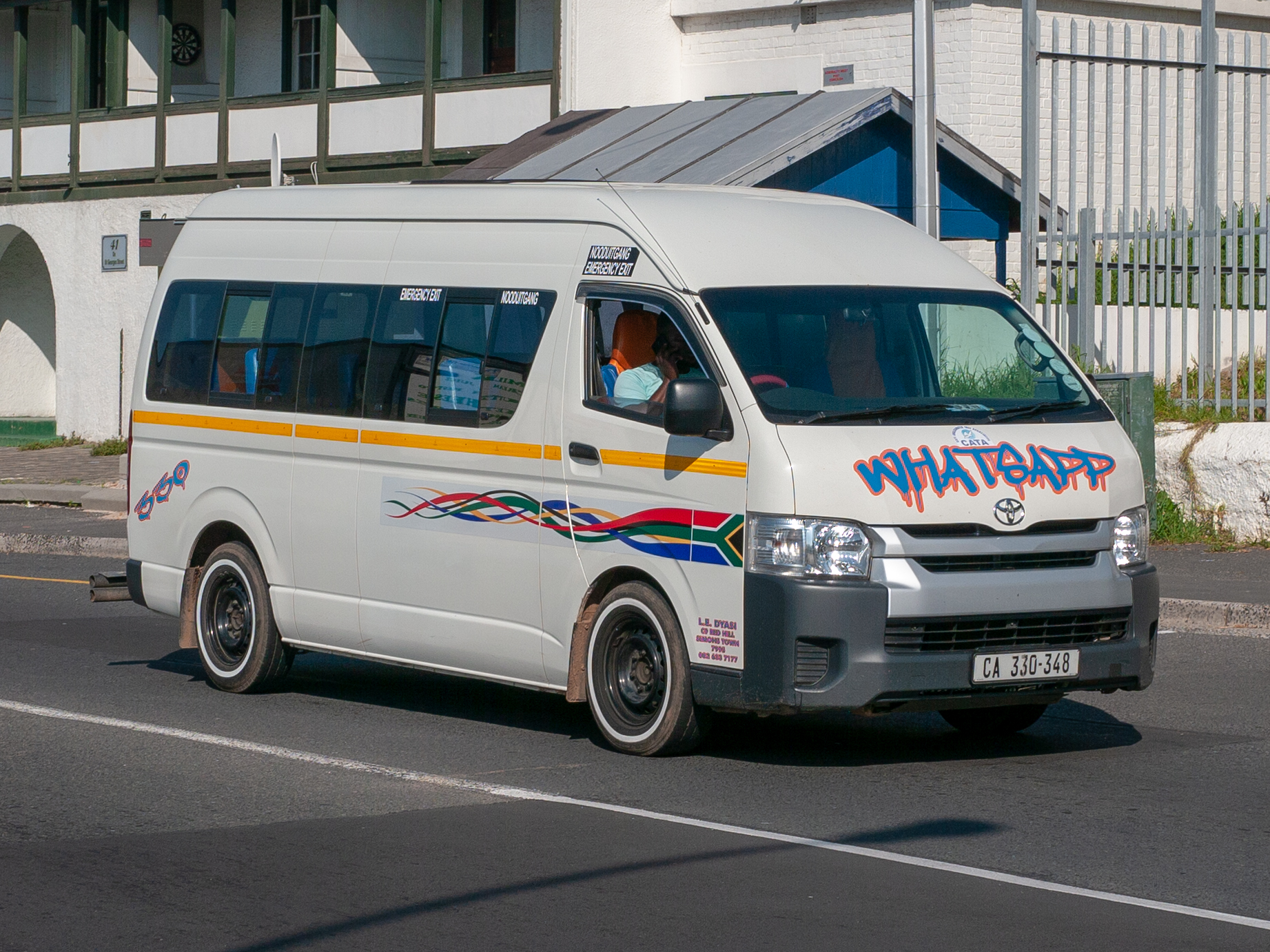
Modern share taxi in Cape Town.

The South African government intended for The National Land Transport Transition Act, Act No 22 of 2000 to help formalise and re-regulate the now out-of-control taxi industry. Along with new legislation, the government instituted a four year re-capitalisation scheme that same year. The intention of this scheme was to replace the fifteen-seater minibuses with eighteen- and thirty-five-seater minibuses. There have been a number of delays in this process. Firstly, the government has been waiting for the taxi industry to form one cohesive association that can speak on behalf of taxi owners; secondly, there is a lot of disagreement from taxi owners as to the nature that the re-capitalisation scheme should take. One major sticking point is the possibility of job losses caused by the uptake of the larger buses. The government attempted to do research into the extent of the prospective job losses in 2000, but the research team was threatened and their work was abandoned.

In 2004, the minister of transport released a revised re-capitalisation timeline, which was scheduled to start in 2005 and end seven years later. At the time of writing the TRP had started, although plagued by delays.

According to the Transport Department, 1,400 old and unsafe taxis have been scrapped, with 80% of the taxi fleet expected to be recapitalised by the 2009/10 financial year. The recapitalisation continues to fuel conflicts within and between taxi associations, as well as between taxi associations and government agencies.

=== 2010-present: Increased taxi violence ===
On 25 December 2020 nine people died and multiple others were injured in the Mount Ayliff Christmas Day Massacre which resulted from a taxi dispute between competing taxi operators.

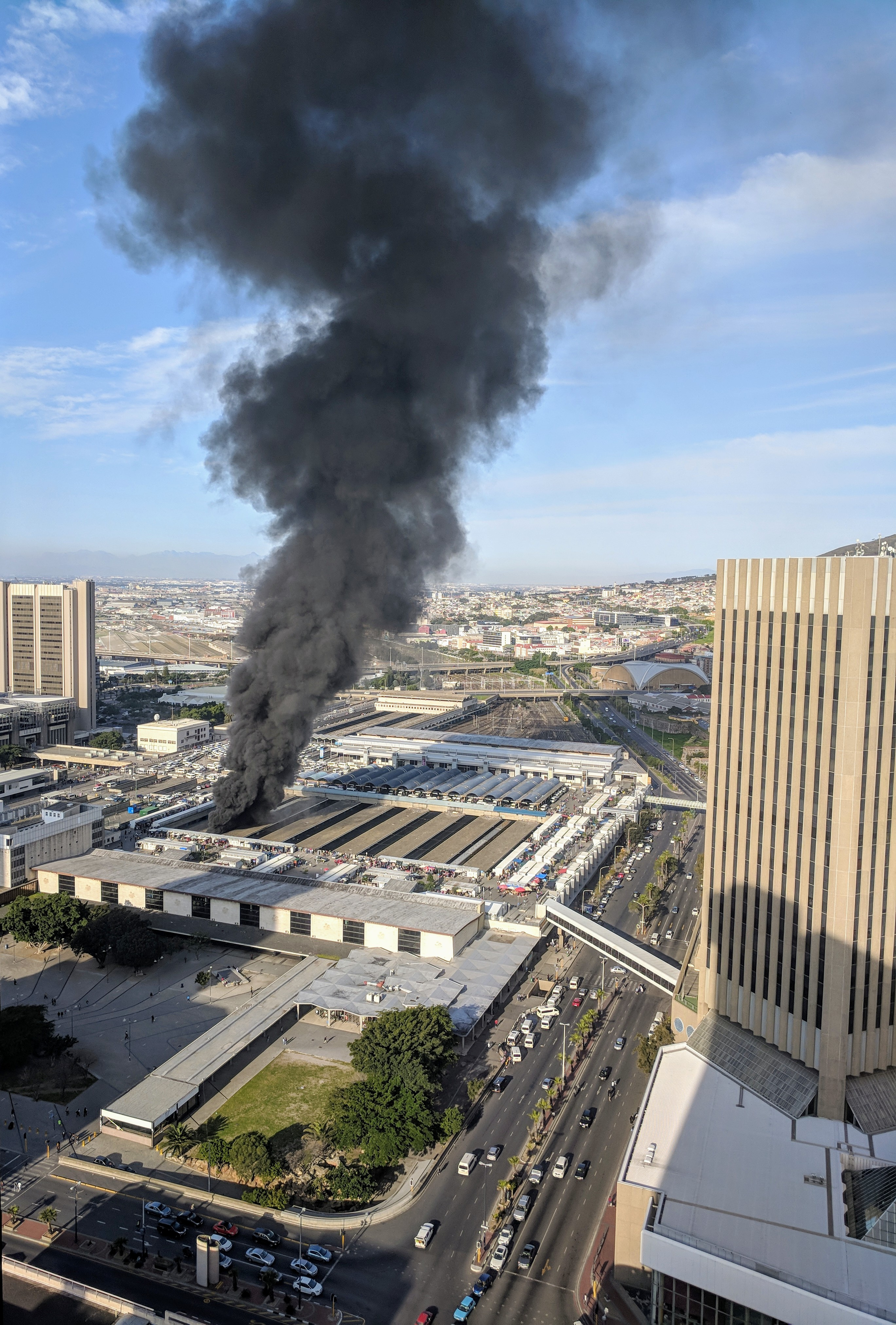
Train fire the Cape Town Railway Station and taxi rank linked to taxi operators.

==== Cape Town ====
In Cape Town taxi operators have been linked to a number of arson attacks on passenger rail services and buses, acts of extortion, murder, and violent conflicts between operators. In July 2021 a spike in taxi violence occurred as Conflict between minibus taxi operators CATA and CODETA for control over the B97 taxi route between Bellville and Paarl resulting in the 2021 Cape Town taxi conflict. At least seven taxi drivers were killed in separate shootings incidents throughout the City of Cape Town. Taxi operators are known to extort private passenger services in an effort to force them out of the market and reduce competition. Multiple protests by mini-bus taxi operators against the authorities for impounding taxis violating road, road worthiness and municipal bylaws have occurred. In response to legal violations by mini-bus taxis the City of Cape Town has introduced policies to more effectively clamp down on the industry.

In August 2023 a violent taxi strike was declared by the South African National Taxi Council (Santaco).

==== Train arson ====
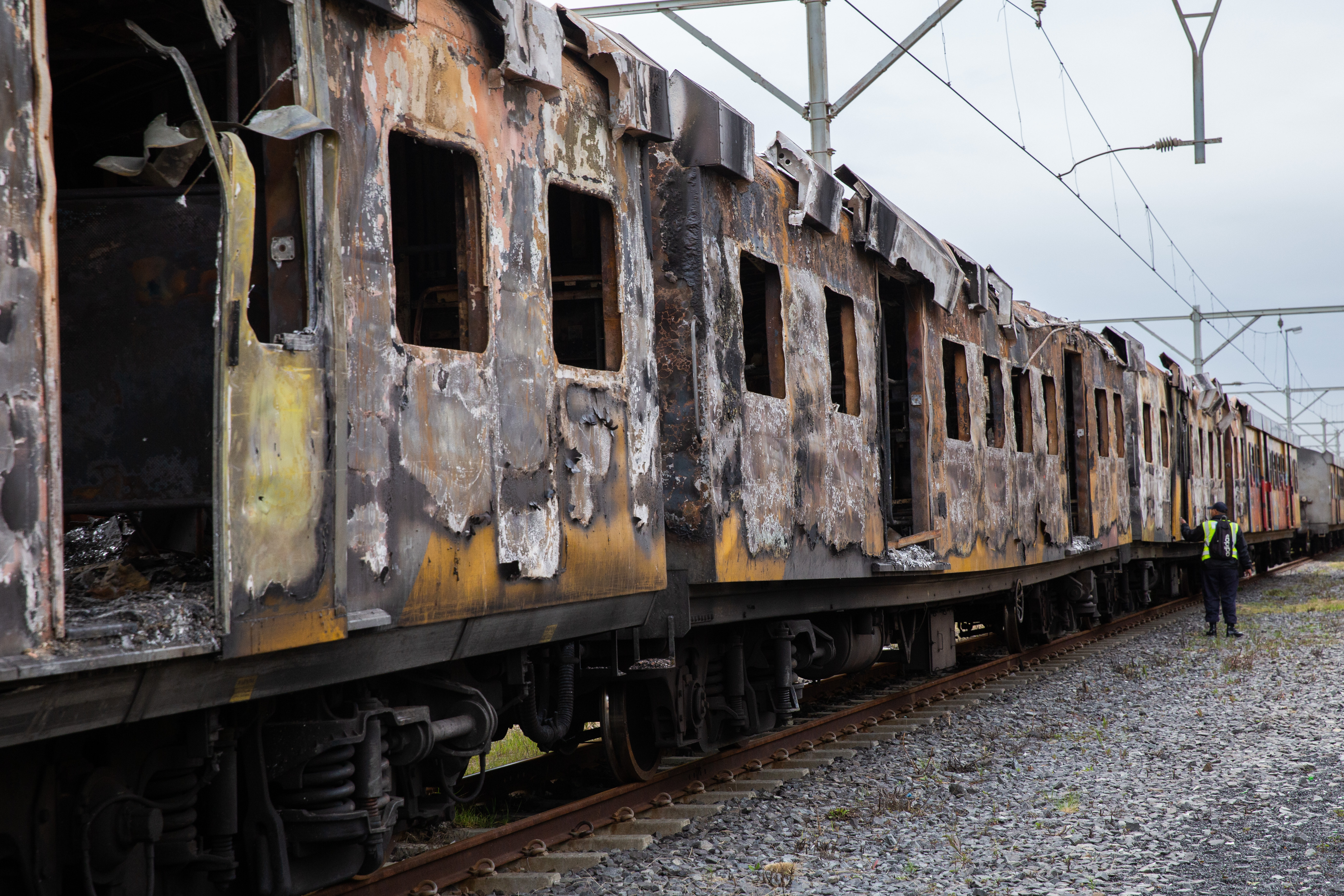
Burnt out Metrorail carriages in Cape Town in 2018

A number of arson attacks on passenger trains in Cape Town have been linked to the minibus taxi industry. Convicted arsonist and taxi rank employee Ricardo Khan testified to the Blue Downs Magistrates' Court "that he gets paid more if more taxis are in operation and business is good" following the torching of a train. Around 140 train carriages had been destroyed on the Cape Town system in a series of "well organised" weekly arson attacks by 2018.

==== Long distance bus routes ====
A number of attacks on long-distance bus operators in the Eastern Cape, Western Cape and Gauteng by minibus taxi associations were reported in 2022. The bus industry alleges that the attacks were motivated by the minibus taxi associations desire to control long distance bus routes and extortion of existing long-distance bus operators. "Between January 2021 and February 2022, over 150 incidents of shootings, stonings and other acts of violence and intimidation directed at bus drivers and passengers were reported to South African Police Service (SAPS) in the three provinces."

== Death toll ==
Taxi-related violence death toll
	Number of deaths	Number of injuries
1991	123	156
1992	184	293
1993	330	526
1994	123	292
1995	197	282
1996	243	331
1997	243	331
1998	246	343
1999	258	287

== See also ==
- Glasgow Ice Cream Wars
- Crime in South Africa
