= Brown's Farm =

Suburb of Cape Town

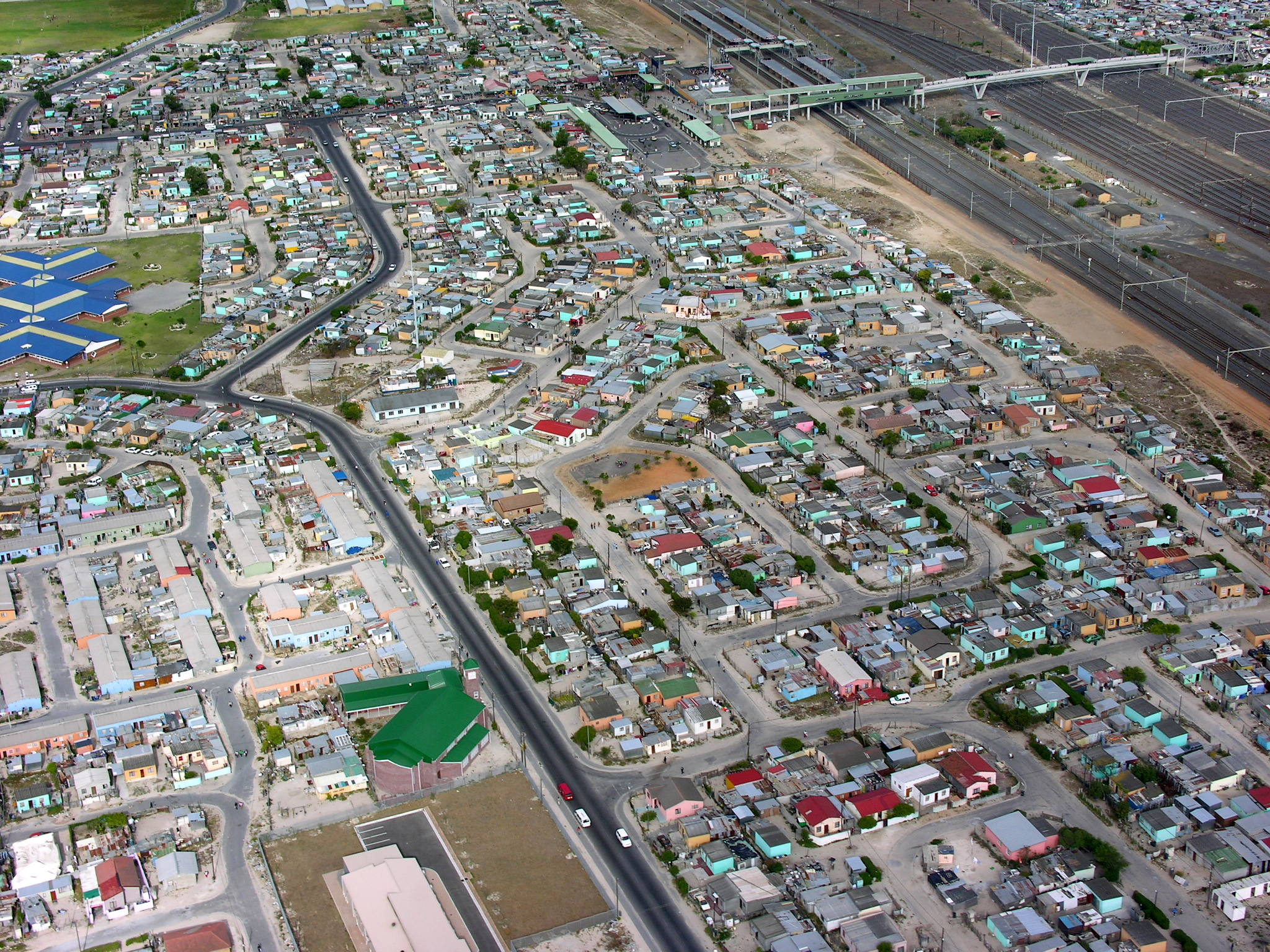
- An aerial view of the central southern part of Browns Farm just north of the train station.

- Location within Western Cape Location within South Africa Location within Africa
- Coordinates: 34°0′S 18°34′E
- Country: South Africa
- Province: Western Cape
- Municipality: City of Cape Town
- Main Place: Philippi

Area
  - Total: 3.39 km^{2} (1.31 sq mi)

Population (2011)
  - Total: 71,518
  - Density: 21,100/km^{2} (54,600/sq mi)
- Time zone: UTC+2 (SAST)
- Postal code (street): 7750
- PO box: 7781
- Area code: 021

The Brown's Farm area is a neighborhood located within the Philippi area of the Cape Flats region of the City of Cape Town, in the Western Cape province of South Africa. The urban area is densely populated and contains many informal homes.

The 2011 national census recorded 71,518 residents living in the area. Brown's Farm is notorious for smash-and-grab theft from vehicles and assault on motorists.

== History ==
The community was first planned out in 1986 by the Apartheid government which saw the establishment of Villages 2B, 3 and 4 with village 4A being added later. It initially had an urban density of 25 housing units per hectare.

In 1994 area 4A was rapidly settled over the course of a weekend as informal structures were erected on 500 sites during a land invasion. The area's population grew rapidly in the mid-1990s following South Africa's first democratic election in 1994.
