= Nyanga, Western Cape =

Suburb of Cape Town, in Western Cape, South Africa

Nyanga
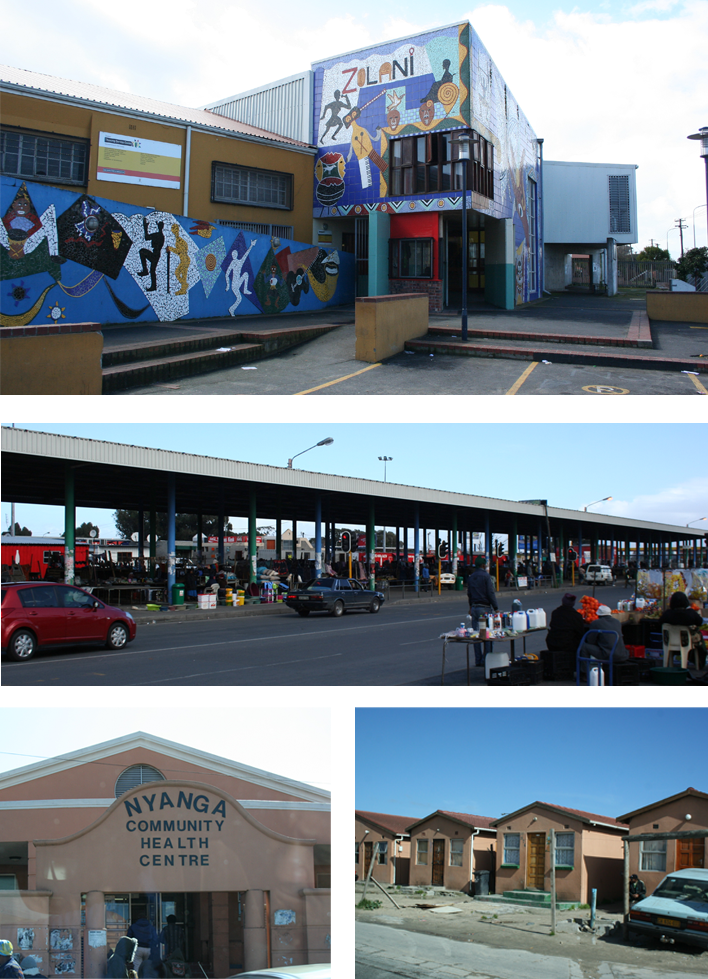
- Top: Zolani Recreational Centre. Middle: Nyanga taxi rank. Bottom left: Nyanga Community Health Centre. Bottom right: government built RDP houses that are common in the area.

- Location within Western Cape Location within South Africa Location within Africa
- Coordinates: 33°59′S 18°35′E
- Country: South Africa
- Province: Western Cape
- Municipality: City of Cape Town
- Main Place: Cape Town

Area
  - Total: 3.09 km^{2} (1.19 sq mi)

Population (2011)
  - Total: 57,996
  - Density: 18,800/km^{2} (48,600/sq mi)

Racial makeup (2011)
  - Black African: 98.8%
  - Coloured: 0.3%
  - Indian/Asian: 0.1%
  - White: 0.2%
  - Other: 0.7%

First languages (2011)
  - Xhosa: 90.2%
  - English: 3.0%
  - Sotho: 1.6%
  - Other: 5.1%
- Time zone: UTC+2 (SAST)
- Postal code (street): 7755
- PO box: 7750

Nyanga is a township in the Western Cape, South Africa. Its name in Xhosa means "moon" and it is one of the oldest black townships in Cape Town. In 1948, Athlone was declared a coloured-area, resulting in the forced removal of black residents, who were forced to settle in Nyanga near Langa.

Nyanga is situated 20 km (12 mi) from Cape Town along the N2 highway, close to the Cape Town International Airport and next to the townships of Gugulethu and Crossroads.

== History ==
The neighbourhood was established in 1946 and was built for the black residents of Elsie's River, Athlone and Simon's Town who were forcibly removed as a result of the 1948 Group Areas Act. Between 1956 and 1959, an estimate of about 21 000 residents from Goodwood, Parow, and Bellville were forcibly relocated to Nyanga. Later on, the government built hostels and for contract workers working in the docks in Cape Town.

=== Politics ===
Residents of Nyanga were active in joining a national call to protest against the apartheid laws passed in 1960. Later they were active in the 1976 student uprisings, which had begun on the other side of the country on 16 June 1976 in Soweto against the use of Afrikaans as the primary medium of instruction in schools. Nyanga and Crossroads became notorious for black-on-black faction fighting that was allegedly perpetrated by police in the early eighties. The local authorities (izibonda) were either allied with UDF or the apartheid police force.

These political differences were allegedly used by the police to stir up violence, and elements of the community were infiltrated by the apartheid regime. This led to emergence of the notoriously violent group called "the witdoeke" (the white scarfs). As a result of these fights Tambo square was formed.

Nyanga comprises nine township subdivisions: Lusaka, KTC, Old Location, Maumau, Zwelitsha, Maholweni "Hostels", White City, Barcelona, Kanana, and Europe.

== Crime ==
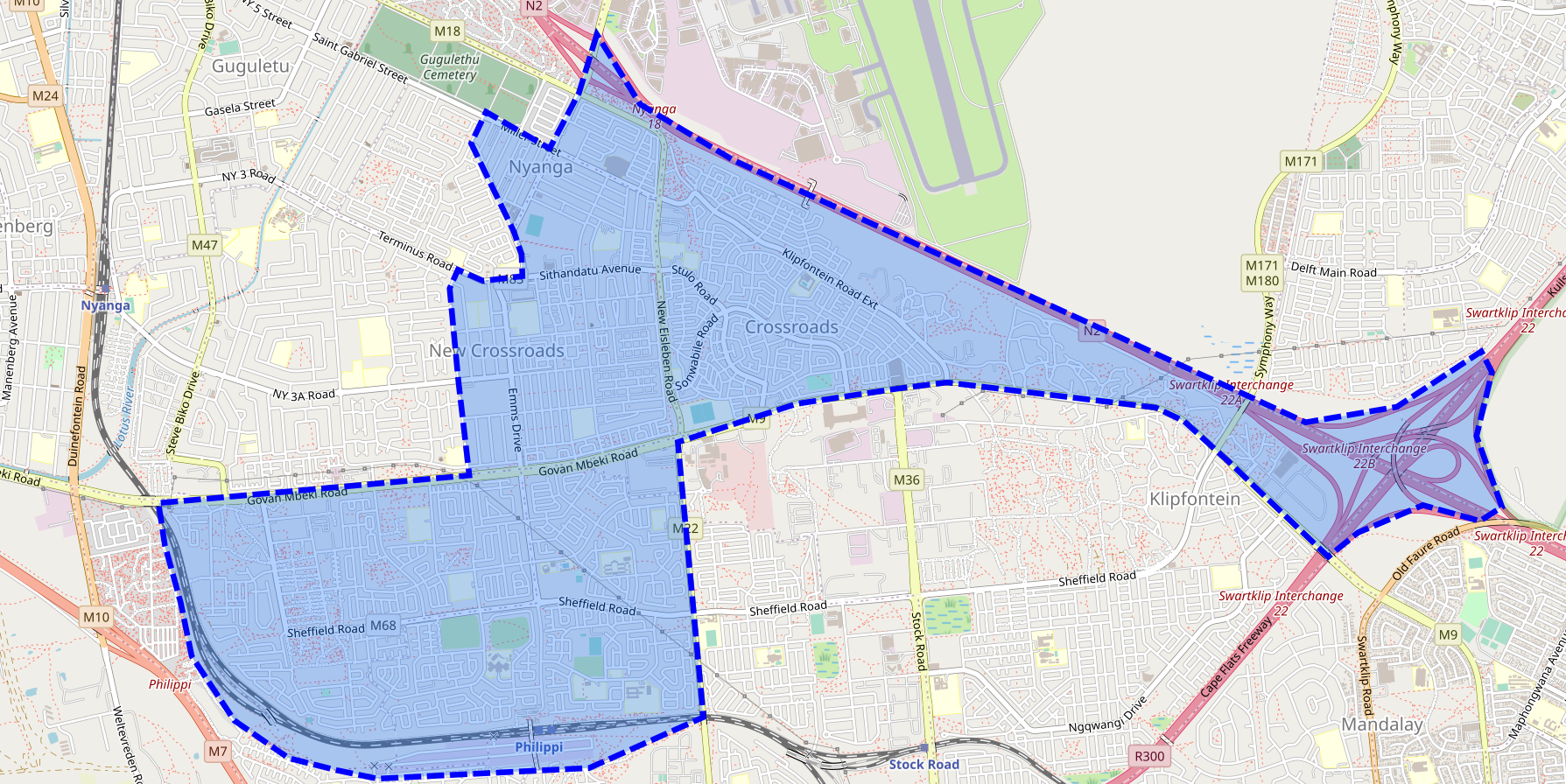
The SAPS precinct area for Nyanga in Cape Town as of 2019 after Samora Machel was separated to become its own precinct area.

The high rate of violent crime in Nyanga had earned the area the moniker "murder capital of South Africa" with 289 recorded homicides in 2018/19, until it was overtaken by another precinct area in 2022. In the five year period before 2018 a total of 1,473 homicides were recorded in the precinct area. The South African Police Service (SAPS) Nyanga precinct area includes half of the Nyanga neighborhood as well as the adjoining communities of New Crossroads and Brown's Farm. Prior to December 2018 the precinct area also included Samora Machel.

By 2021/22 the number of recorded homicides had declined to 203. In November 2023 Google Maps announced that it would no longer recommend routes through the area following a number of violent incidents targeting motorists that included the death of motorists during the 2023 taxi strike.

== Government institutions and public services ==
Several government institutions maintain a presence in Nyanga in order to provide various vital services to the community:

- Nyanga Home Affairs Office
- The South African Department of Labour has a satellite office in Nyanga.
- The Nyanga Community Health Clinic
- Masincedane Clinic
- Nyanga Police Station
- Nyanga Public Library loans books to the community and provides several useful informational services.

== Churches ==
Some of the churches that are located in Nyanga are:

- Apostolic Church
- Assembly of God Nyanga
- FH Gow AME Church
- Fresh Fire Church
- Holy Cross Anglican Church
- New Crossroads Baptist Church
- Reformed Gospel Church
- St Mary's Catholic Church
- Trinity society Church

== See also ==
- Goldstone Commission
