= Fresh food =

Food which has not been preserved and has not spoiled

Fresh food is food which has not been preserved and has not spoiled yet. For vegetables and fruits, this means that they have been recently harvested and treated properly postharvest; for meat, it has recently been slaughtered and butchered; for fish, it has been recently caught or harvested and kept cold.

Dairy products are generally considered fresh and will spoil quickly. Thus, fresh cheese is cheese which has not been dried or salted for aging, such as fresh mozzarella. Sour cream is sometimes called "fresh" (crème fraîche) despite being fermented, a form of preservation.

Fresh food has not been dried, smoked, salted, frozen, canned, pickled, or otherwise preserved. Foods which have undergone forms of preservation which lengthen shelf time by only a short time and without changing the taste of the food, such as pasteurisation or chilling, are usually still considered fresh.

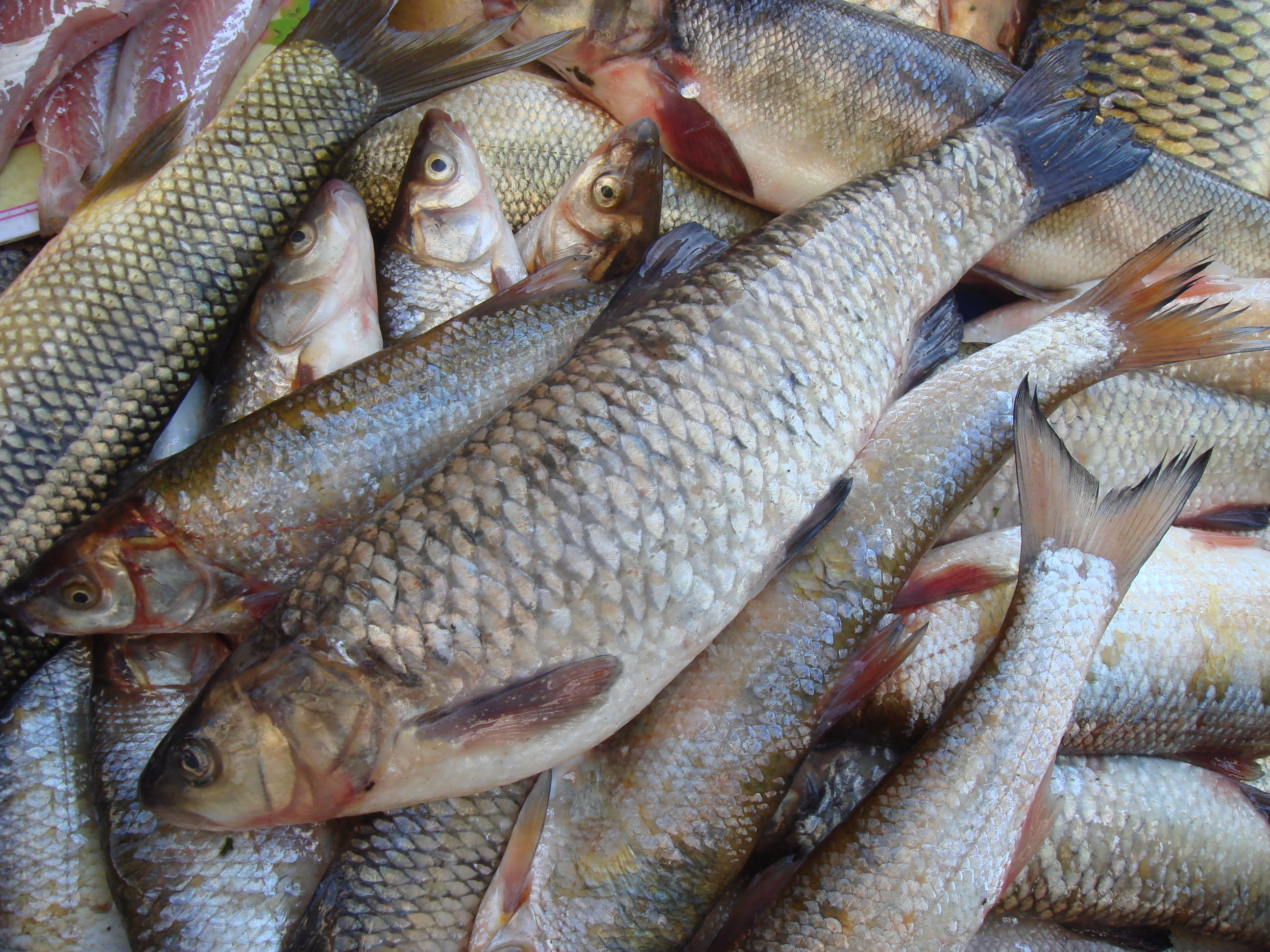
Fresh fish

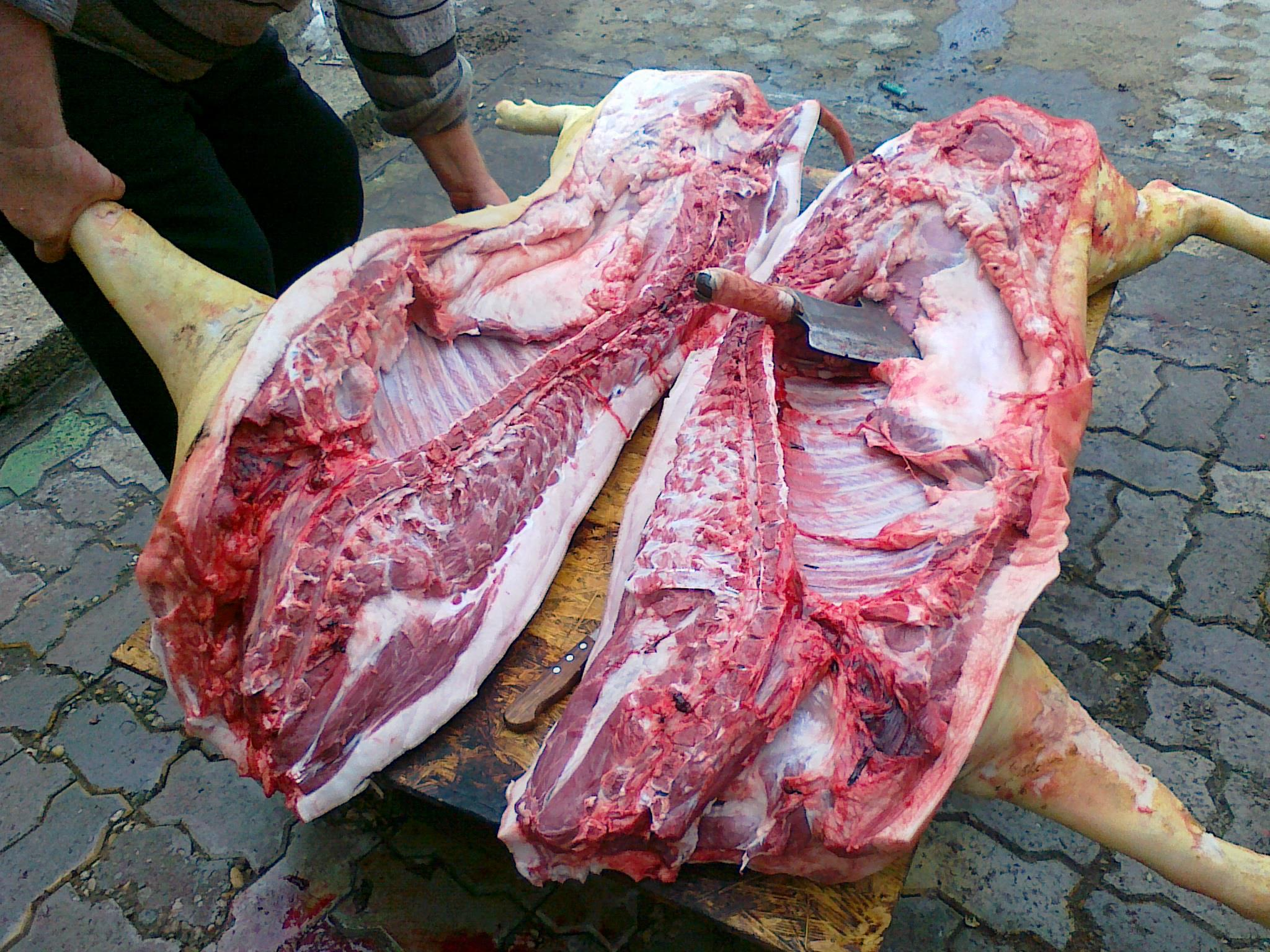
Fresh meat

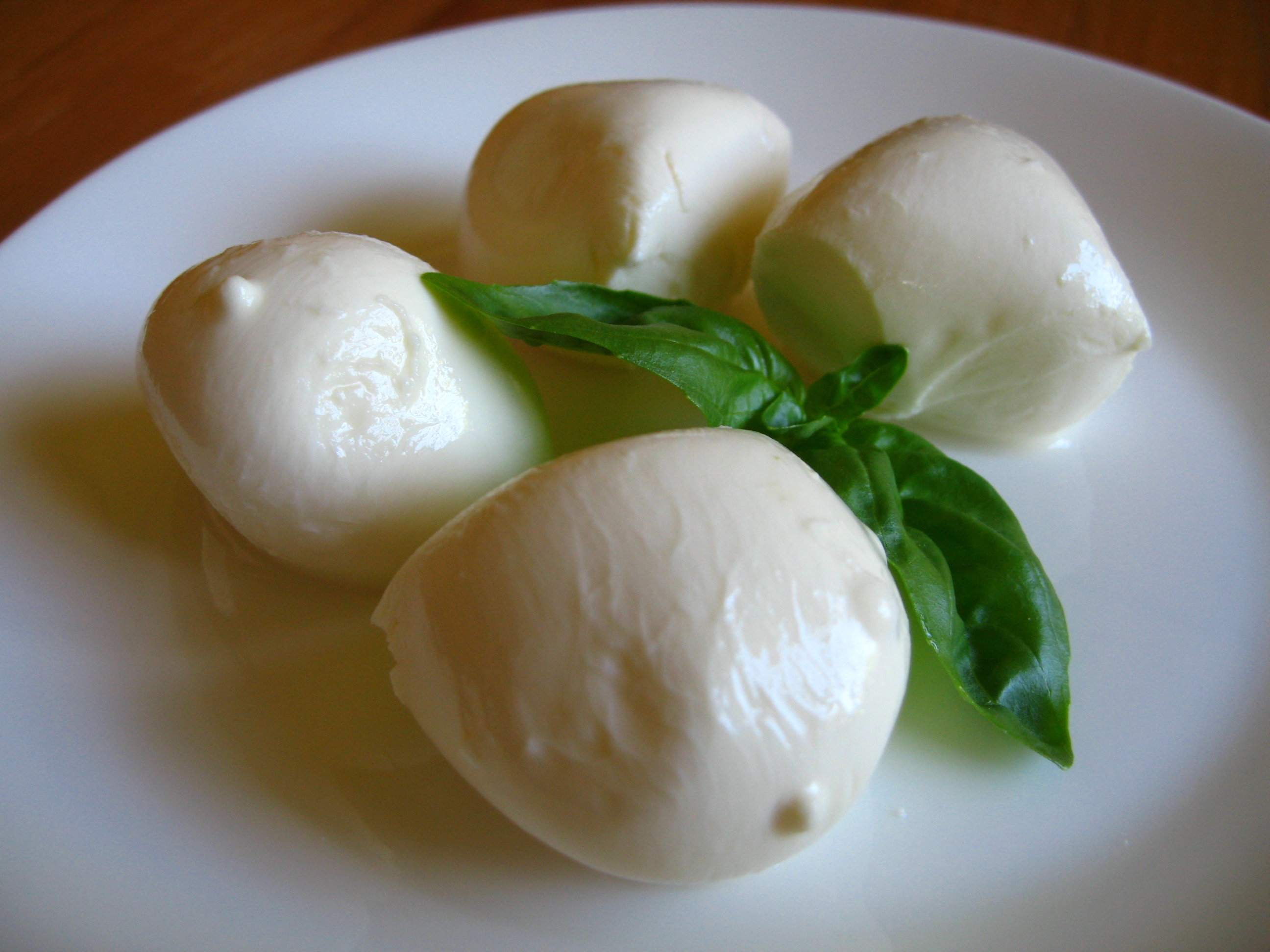
Mozzarella is commonly eaten fresh, though salted mozzarella is also available.

Fresh fruits and vegetables

Pasteurised milk is usually still considered fresh, though it has undergone a form of preservation.

== In cooking ==
Freshly cooked food has not been held cold or warm, reheated, for a long time; or made from leftovers. As cooking is a form of preservation, freshly cooked food is not strictly considered fresh food.
