= Bracken Nature Reserve =

Protected land in Brackenfell in the Western Cape, South Africa

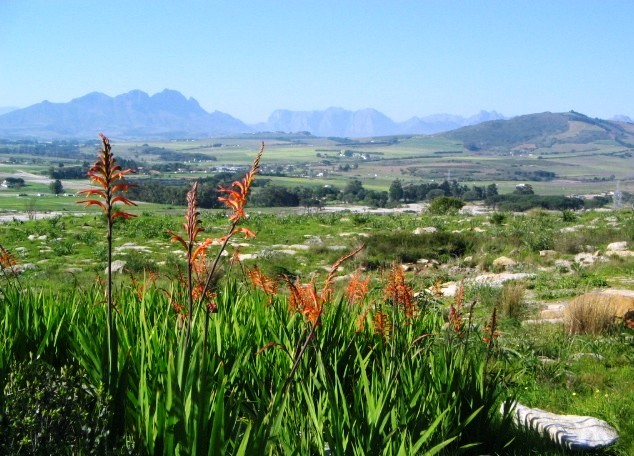

- Location within Western Cape
- Location: Brackenfell, Western Cape, South Africa
- Coordinates: 33.8784°S 18.7137°E
- Area: 36 hectares (89 acres)
- Established: June 1976

Bracken Nature Reserve is a 36-hectare (89-acre) piece of protected land in Brackenfell in the Western Cape, South Africa.

This park preserves badly threatened Cape Flats Sand Fynbos and Swartland Granite Renosterveld vegetation. A diverse array of orchids, succulents and flowering bulbs are among the over 160 plant species that occur here. Of these, ten occur only within the City of Cape Town and are in serious danger of extinction, including Antimima aristulata, cowslip (Lachenalia aloides), canary yellow vygie (Lampranthus glaucus) and carrion flower (Orbea variegata). The park is also home to a variety of small mammals, reptiles and amphibians, as well as range of bird species.

There is an indigenous garden at the entrance, and footpaths that take visitors past birdlife and views of the surrounding countryside. The reserve is situated on top of an old quarry and landfill site so gas extraction pipes have had to be installed, to let the excess gases from the decomposing waste escape.

Theft of Drimia elata and Pelargonium triste plants from the reserve was reported in 2026. The underground parts of these species contain strong compounds that make them popular in traditional medicine.

== See also ==
- Biodiversity of Cape Town
- Cape Flats Sand Fynbos
- List of nature reserves in Cape Town
- Renosterveld
