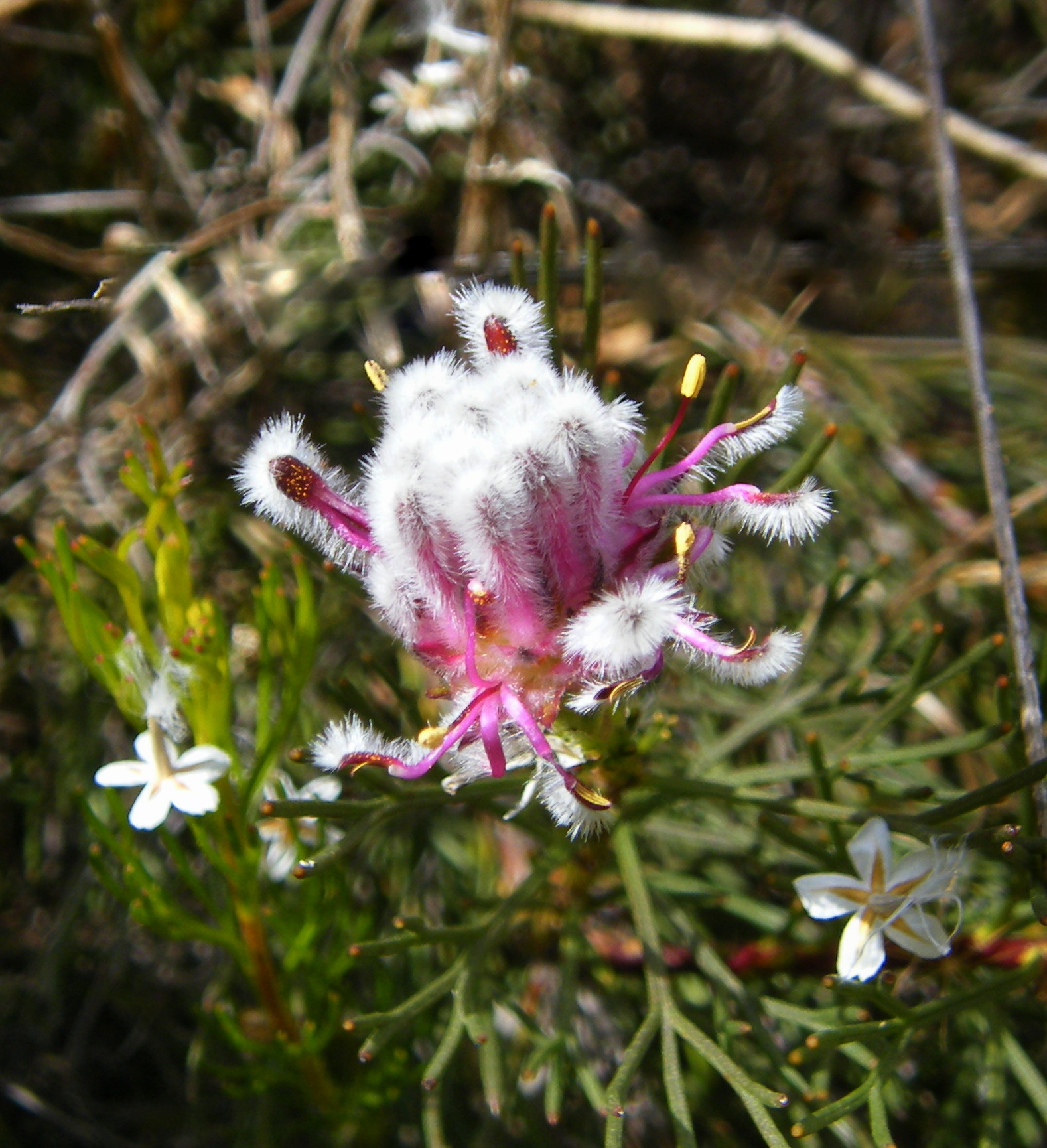

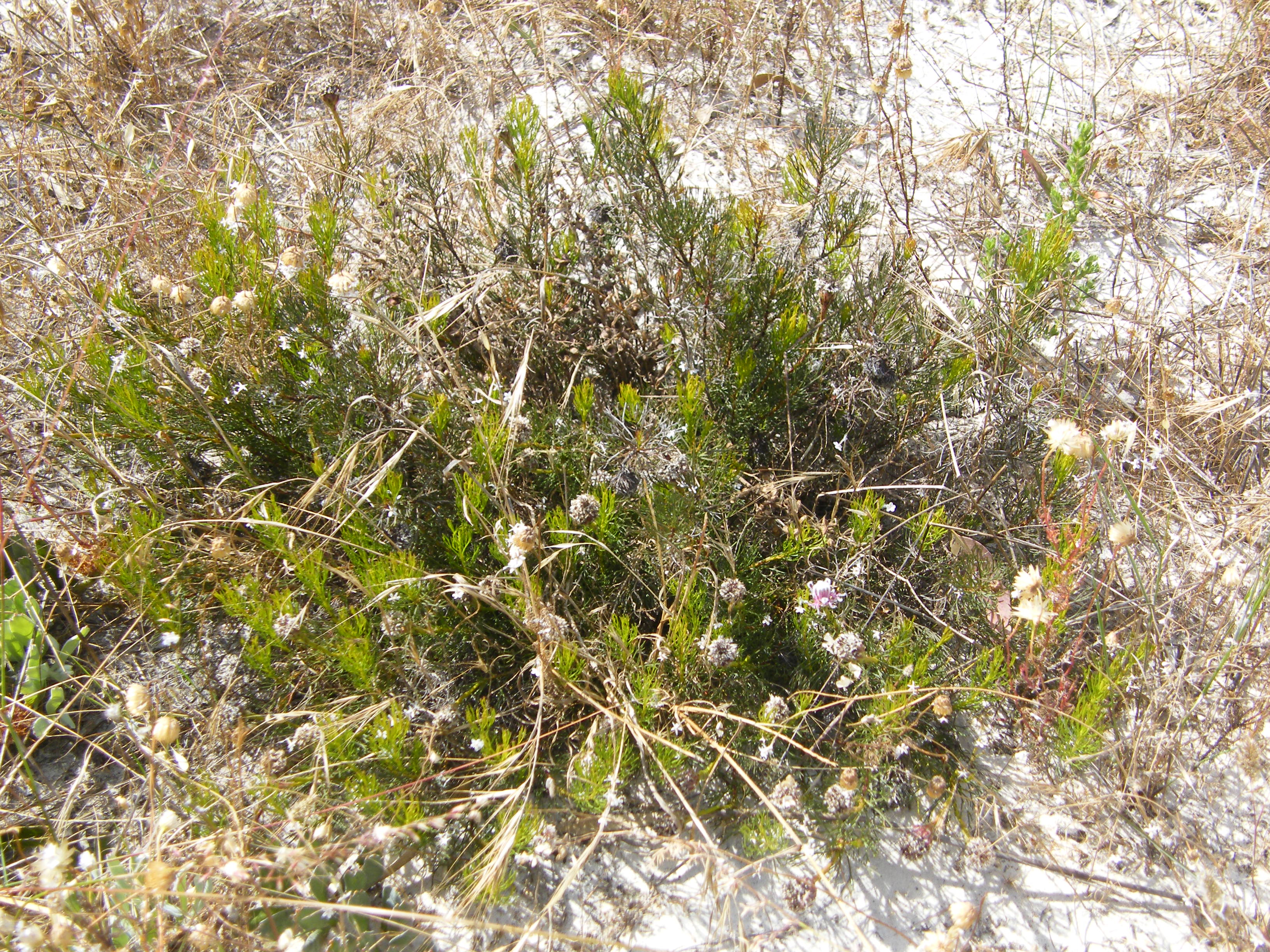

Conservation status
- Critically Endangered (IUCN 3.1)

Scientific classification
- Kingdom: Plantae
- Clade: Tracheophytes
- Clade: Angiosperms
- Clade: Eudicots
- Order: Proteales
- Family: Proteaceae
- Genus: Serruria
- Species: S. furcellata

Binomial name
- Serruria furcellata R.Br.

= Serruria furcellata =

Species of plant

Serruria furcellata, the Kraaifontein spiderhead, is a flower-bearing shrub that belongs to the genus Serruria and forms part of the fynbos. The plant is native to the Western Cape, specifically found in Brackenfell, Kraaifontein and Kuils River.

== Description ==
The shrub is erect and grows only 50 cm tall and bears flowers from August to October.

After a fire, the plant's roots can sprout again. Two months after flowering, the fruit falls off and ants disperse the seeds. They store the seeds in their nests. The plant is unisexual. Pollination takes place through the action of insects. The plant grows in sandy soil at elevations of 90 – 390 m.

== Habitat ==
The Kraaifontein Spiderhead, found in the fynbos biome on sandy flats with an elevational range of 0–100 m, is resilient to wildfires, resprouting from underground structures. Its reproductive strategy involves seed dispersal by ants, facilitating protection from predators and germination after fires. However, the species faces severe threats, with 86% of its habitat irreversibly modified due to urban and industrial development in the City of Cape Town. The remaining habitat is degraded by invasive species, over-burning, and disturbances, with the only known subpopulation confined to a severely degraded area smaller than one hectare in the northern Cape Flats.

== Conservation ==
This plant has previously been considered extinct. In 1985 it occurred in only two places, near Kraaifontein and close to Bottelary Heuwels, where in 1979 three plants were identified. After 1985, however, there was no sign of the plants at the two sites and it was assumed that the species became extinct. In 2004, however, two plants were discovered at North Pine, but one was soon destroyed by the municipality's bush cutting program.

However, Cape Town's Environmental Resource Management Division developed the 36-hectare Bracken Nature Reserve where native plants are preserved. Kraaifontein spiderhead specimens were transplanted after successful garden cultivation.
