= R300 (South Africa) =

Road in South Africa

Regional route R300

Route information
- Maintained by WCDTPW and SANRAL
- Length: 22 km (14 mi)

Major junctions
- South end: M7 in Mitchells Plain
- M36 near Philippi; N2 near Delft; M54 near Blue Downs; M12 near Blue Downs; R102 near Bellville; M23 near Kuils River; R101 in Brackenfell
- North end: N1 in Brackenfell

Location
- Country: South Africa
- Provinces: Western Cape
- Municipalities: City of Cape Town

Highway system
- Numbered routes of South Africa
← R114	→ R301

The R300, known as the Kuils River Road and the Cape Flats Road, is a Regional Route in the Cape Metropole, South Africa that connects Mitchells Plain with the N2, Kuils River, and the N1 between Bellville and Brackenfell. The R300 is a freeway for its entire length; it forms part of the proposed N21 (Peninsula Expressway).

== Route ==
The R300 begins at the Stellenberg Interchange with the N1 between Bellville and Brackenfell and heads south bordering between both towns. It eventually borders between Bellville and Kuils River and borders between Delft and Blue Downs before intersecting with the N2 (Settlers Way) north of Mitchells Plain and Philippi. It then turns in a south-westerly direction, bordering between Mitchells Plain and Philippi and ends at an intersection with the M7 (Jakes Gerwel Drive) in Mitchells Plain, just east of the Philippi Horticultural Area (PHA).

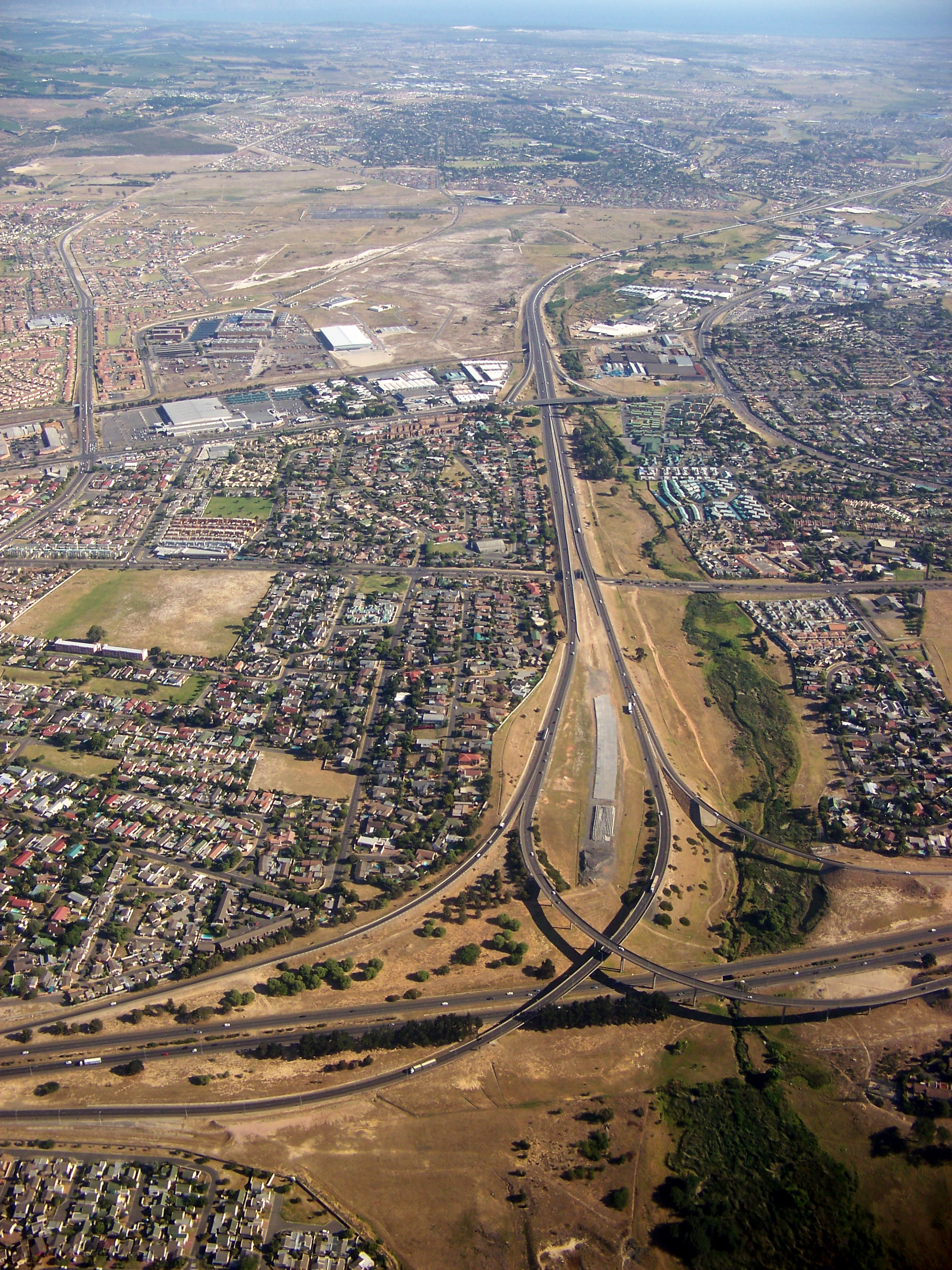
R300 (Kuils River Parkway) with the N1 Stellenberg Interchange in the foreground

== Junctions ==
Municipality	Location	km	mi	Exit	Destinations	Notes
Cape Town	Mitchells Plain	0.0	0.0	—	M7 Jakes Gerwel Drive, Mitchells Plain, Athlone	At-grade intersection
Cape Town	Philippi	3.1	1.9	12	M36 Stock Road, Mitchells Plain, Philippi	
Cape Town	Delft	6.2	3.9	(22)	N2 Settlers Way, Cape Town International, Cape Town, Somerset West	
Cape Town	Blue Downs	9.4	5.8	18	M54 Hindle Road, Blue Downs, Delft	
Cape Town	Belhar	12.1	7.5	21	M12 Stellenbosch Arterial, Belhar, Elsie's River, Blackheath, Stellenbosch	
Cape Town	Kuils River	16.8	10.4	25	R102 Van Riebeeck Road, Kuils River, Bellville	
Cape Town	Kuils River	17.6	10.9	26	M23 Bottelary Road, Kuils River, Bellville, Brackenfell	Southbound exit, northbound entrance
Cape Town	Bellville	20.0	12.4	29	R101 Old Paarl Road, Brackenfell, Bellville	Northbound exit, southbound entrance
Cape Town	Brackenfell	22.0	13.7	(27)	N1, Cape Town, Paarl	
R300 ends

== Peninsula Expressway ==
The entirety of the R300 freeway is part of the proposed Peninsula Expressway, which is to be designated as the N21 and is to be a toll road. This new national route is to include the current R300 freeway as well as extensions at either end.

The proposed road is meant to extend the current R300 from its northern terminus (Stellenberg Interchange) with the N1 highway, past Durbanville, bending west, up to the Melkbosstrand and Blouberg coastal area. It is also meant to extend the current R300 from its southern terminus (Mitchells Plain) junction with the M7 route (Jakes Gerwel Drive) westwards, through Zeekoevlei, up to the Muizenberg and Westlake area.

In August 2022 the Western Cape Department of Transport and Public Works announced the launch of an environmental impact assessment for the extension of the R300 from its current terminus at the N1 northwards to the R302 (Wellington Road). Grading and a road reserve currently exist in this section, and ramp connections are proposed at the M73 (De Bron Road), Legato Drive, and the R302.
