= Brackenfell =

Town in the Western Cape, South Africa

- Town
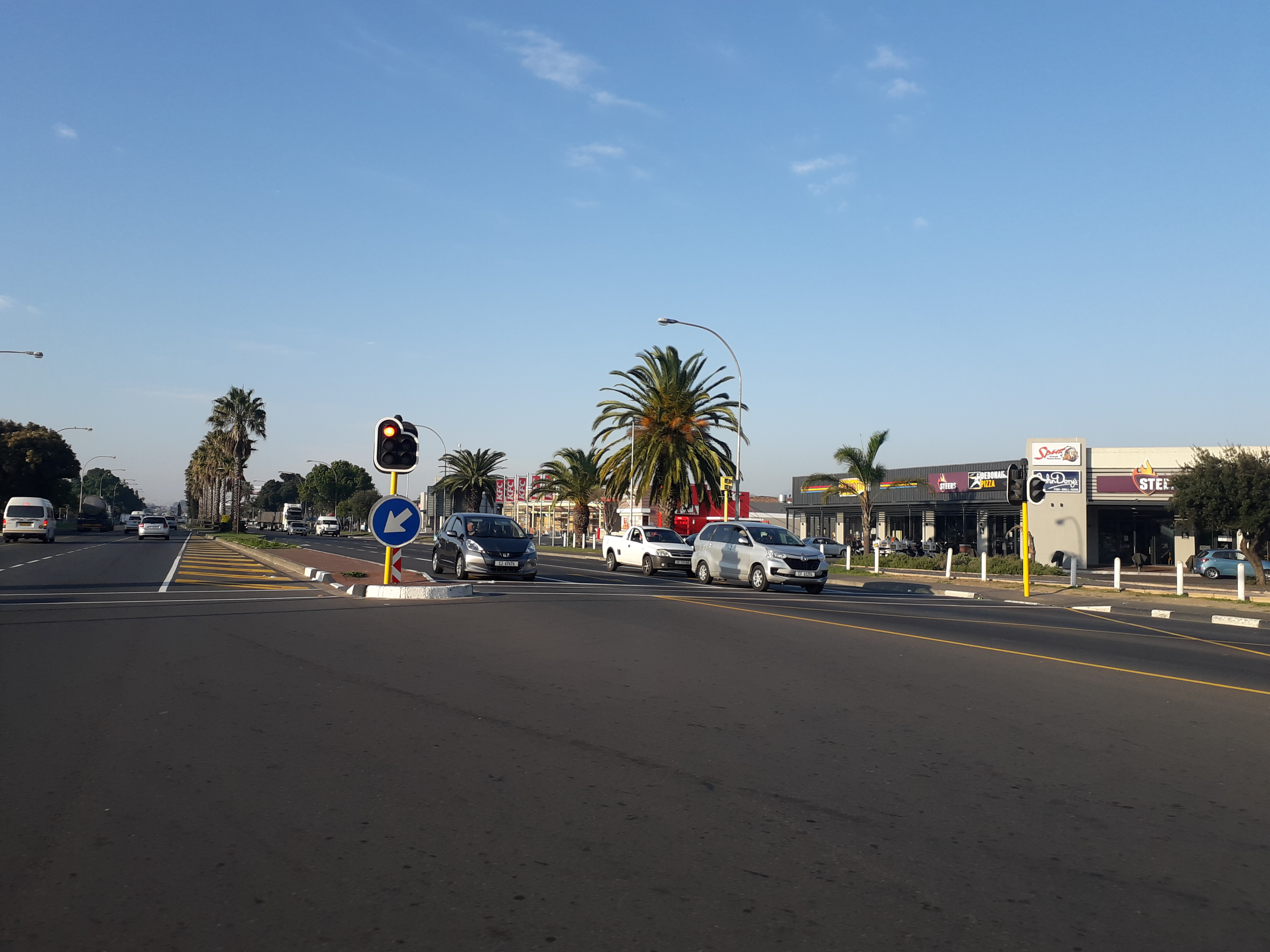
- Brackenfell Central Business District with its main road, Old Paarl Road

- Location within Western Cape Location within South Africa Location within Africa
- Coordinates: 33°52′00″S 18°41′00″E
- Country: South Africa
- Province: Western Cape
- Municipality: City of Cape Town
- Established: 1913

Area
  - Total: 25.27 km^{2} (9.76 sq mi)

Population (2011)
  - Total: 44,842
  - Density: 1,775/km^{2} (4,596/sq mi)

Racial makeup (2011)
  - Black African: 9.8%
  - Coloured: 9.0%
  - Indian/Asian: 0.8%
  - White: 79.0%
  - Other: 1.4%

First languages (2011)
  - Afrikaans: 71.1%
  - English: 20.8%
  - Xhosa: 3.4%
  - Other: 4.7%
- Time zone: UTC+2 (SAST)
- Postal code (street): 7560, 7561, 7562
- PO box: 7561
- Area code: 021

Brackenfell is a town in the Western Cape province of South Africa, situated on the N1 about 30 km (17 mi) north-east of Cape Town and 35 km (22 mi) south-west of Paarl. It is also a suburb in the City of Cape Town metro planning area, as part of the Northern Suburbs region.

Regarded as the “gateway” to the Cape Winelands, the town marks the start of the Bottelary Hills Wine Route which follows the scenic Bottelary Road to Stellenbosch, about 22 kilometres (14 mi) to the south-east.

== History ==
The earliest activity on what today is known as Brackenfell was when the "de Clapmuts" was a refreshment post. Brackenfell specifically form part of Klapmutsberg, better known as de Bottelarij. In 1712 the area known as "Kruispad" was transferred to Selie, J. Kruispad was owned by Brink, A. and in 1901 he sold it to a Scottish Immigrant Walton, G.H. The flora on this farm reminded him of the same in Scotland. He called it Brackenfell (Bracken means fern; Fell means hill). The richness of granite in the area let to the farm being sold to a Brick company in 1903 and a granite quarry was established. Activity here stopped in 1948. In 1904 a railway station was established.

When it was first founded, Brackenfell was a rural area centred around major road crossing, but today it is a well-known suburb located behind the 'boerewors gordyn', which translates to 'sausage curtain'. It is called this because people living in this area 'braai' (barbecue) boerewors very often. "Gordyn" curtain is a figure of speech.

In 1976, a large investment was made by retail giant, Pick n Pay, when it opened a Hypermarket in Brackenfell, which still stands today. At the time, the Hypermarket was regarded as an ultra-modern decentralised shopping centre which had a crucial role in the development of then-small town of Brackenfell, lying just outside Cape Town.

In 1996, Brackenfell lost its municipal status and was dissolved into the Oostenberg Municipality along with Kraaifontein, Kuilsrivier and Blue Downs/Eersterivier as part of the transition in local government. As of 2000, Brackenfell was integrated into the City of Cape Town Metropolitan Municipality, or the Greater Cape Town area and is effectively a suburb of the City of Cape Town.

Due to the rising numbers of COVID-19 cases in the Western Cape, the Western Cape Health Department constructed a field hospital in the Brackengate industrial area. It opened on 20 July 2020 with 10 patients. The field hospital has capacity 300 beds for COVID-19 patients from hospitals struggling with capacity.

The field hospital became the central COVID-19 dedicated hospital for the Western Cape in September as the Cape Town International Convention Centre's field hospital which was the central COVID-19 dedicated hospital was decommissioned in September due to declining COVID-19 cases in the City of Cape Town.

== Geography ==
Brackenfell is situated on the eastern boundary of the City of Cape Town, bordering the Stellenbosch Local Municipality and is neighboured by Bellville to the west, Kraaifontein to the east, Durbanville to the north and Kuilsrivier to the south. It is flanked by the Bottelary Hills to the south-east, with Kanonkop (“Cannon Hill”) being the highest point in the town at 177 m (580 ft).

=== Suburbs ===
Brackenfell is divided into 3 main suburban areas, namely Brackenfell Central (the area between the N1 and the passing railway), Brackenfell North (the entire area north of the N1) and Brackenfell South (the entire area south of the railway).

==== Brackenfell Central ====
- Arauna (residential)
- Brackenfell Industrial (industrial)
- Eden Park (residential)
- Ferndale (residential)
- Hoogstede (residential)
- Morgenster (residential)
- Morgenster Heights (residential)
- Okavango Park (industrial)
- Springbokpark (residential)
- St Michaels (residential)

==== Brackenfell North ====
- Brackenfell North (agricultural holdings)
- Cape Gate (retail)
- Chamonix (residential)
- De Tuin (residential)
- Kleinbron Estate (residential)
- Kleinbron Park (residential)
- Marlborough Park (residential)
- Vredekloof (residential)
- Vredekloof Glen (residential)
- Vredekloof Heights (residential)
- Vredekloof Rand (residential)
- Welgeleë (residential)

==== Brackenfell South ====
- Birgundy (residential)
- Brackenfell South (residential)
- De Oude Spruit (residential)
- Kaapsig (residential)
- Klaradyn Retirement Village (residential)
- Protea Heights (residential)
- Protea Village (residential)
- Ruwari (residential)
- Sonkring (residential)
- Northpine (residential)

== Schools ==
- Awe Primary School
- Bastion Primary School
- Brackenfell High School
- Brackenfell Primary School
- Bubbalu Day Care Centre (independent nursery school)
- Curro Brackenfell (private primary school)
- Curro Castle (private nursery / pre-primary school)
- Destinatus Private School
- Peppertree Kidz
- Protea Heights Academy (high school)
- Vredekloof Primary School

== Economy ==
=== Major companies ===
Africa’s largest supermarket retail chain, Shoprite-Checkers and its associated subsidiaries such as Freshmark and OK have their headquarters in Brackenfell. Other notable retail organisations with head offices in Brackenfell include Food Lover's Market, Montagu Snacks and Brights Hardware.

=== Industries ===
Brackenfell is an emerging industrial node in the Greater Cape Town metropolitan area, particularly sought-after by businesses involved in warehousing and distribution due its proximity to major freeways and the city centre. Located in the east of the town are the established industrial areas of Brackenfell Industria and Okavango Park, while in the west is the newer industrial area of Brackengate, also known as Morgan Industrial.

=== Retail ===
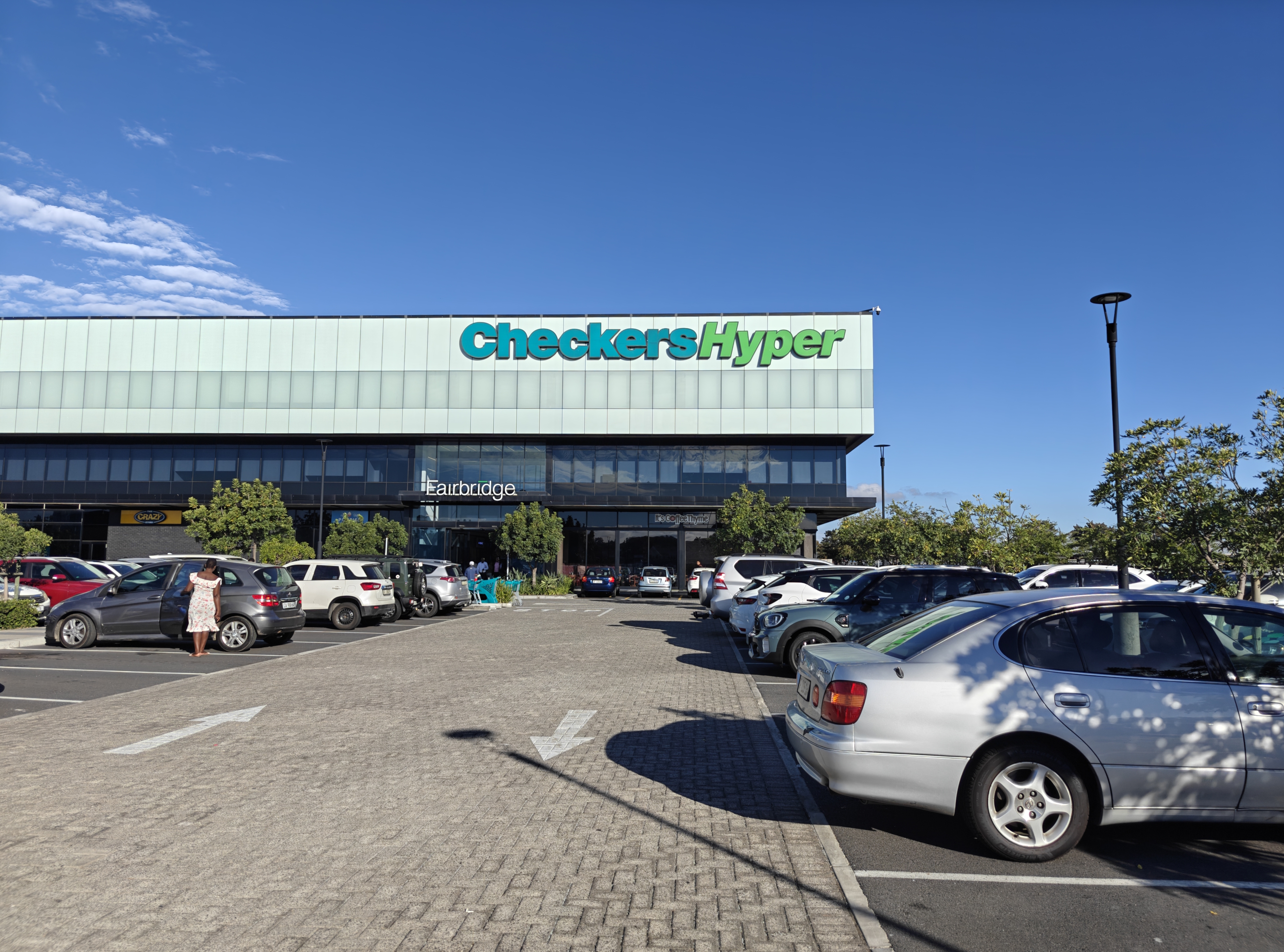
Fairbridge Mall in Brackenfell

The central business district of Brackenfell features three major shopping centres along Old Paarl Road: Brackenfell Hyper Centre, Brackenfell Shopping Centre, and Fairbridge Mall. The surrounding suburbs also host Brackenfell Corner, Glengarry Shopping Centre, and Boulevard Square.

Located north of the N1 on Okavango Road, the Cape Gate Regional Shopping Centre is the largest in Brackenfell and one of the largest in the Greater Cape Town region. Known as the Cape Gate precinct, this area features the Cape Gate Lifestyle Precinct, various car dealerships, and warehouse outlets like Makro and Builders Warehouse, along with Mediclinic Cape Gate, which provides private hospital services.

== Transport ==
=== Rail ===
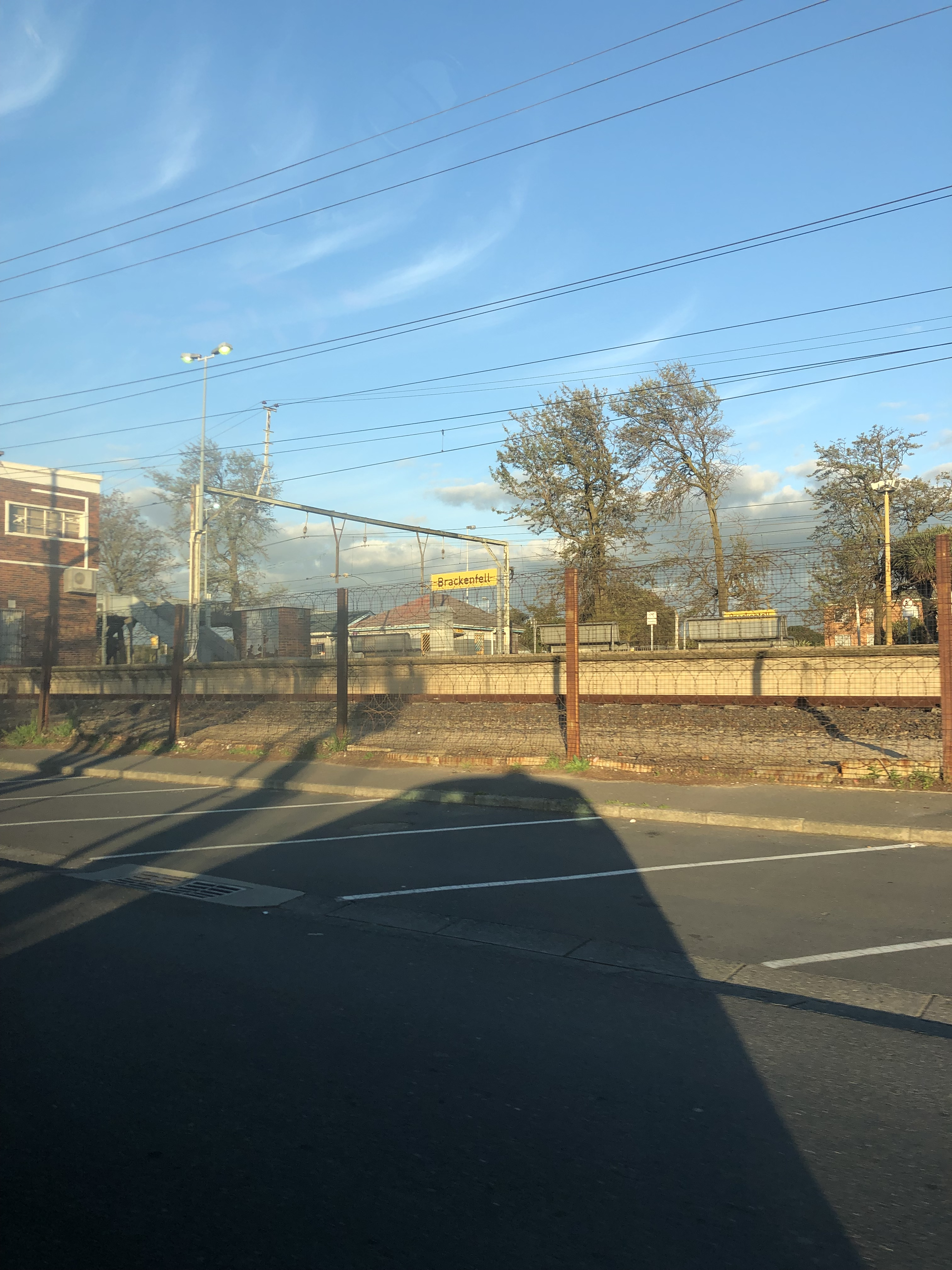
Brackenfell Railway Station

The main Metrorail route between Cape Town in the south-west (via Bellville) and Wellington in the north-east (via Kraaifontein and Paarl), known as the Northern Line has a station in the Brackenfell CBD, namely the Brackenfell railway station.

=== Road ===
The N1 is the main freeway that runs through Brackenfell, passing from Cape Town to Paarl. The R300 (Kuils River Freeway) is a freeway on the western boundary of Brackenfell, starting at an interchange with the N1, the Stellenberg Interchange, heading south towards Mitchells Plain. The older section of the N1, now known as the R101 (Old Paarl Road), is the main thoroughfare through the Brackenfell CBD, passing from Bellville to Kraaifontein.

Brackenfell is also served by a number of metropolitan routes linking it to surrounding towns. The M23 (Bottelary Road) connects to Bellville and Stellenbosch. The M25 (Frans Conradie Drive) connects to Bellville and Kraaifontein. The M73 (De Bron Road) connects to Durbanville and Kraaifontein. The M100 (Brackenfell Boulevard) connects to Durbanville and Kuilsrivier. The M137 (Okavango Road) connects to Durbanville and Kraaifontein.

== Nature ==
The Bracken Nature Reserve, situated in the Ruwari suburban area, was once a quarry site and was later declared a nature reserve after some negotiations between the Cape Town City Council and the Stellenbosch Divisional Council.

== Coat of arms ==
Brackenfell was a municipality from 1970 to 1996. In November 1971, the council registered a coat of arms at the Bureau of Heraldry.

The arms, designed by Cornelis Pama, were Per chevron embowed Or and Vert, three shot balls counterchanged, i.e. a shield divided by a curved chevron-shaped line into gold and green, with two green balls at the top and a golden ball at the bottom. The crest was three ferns with the motto Tenax in fide.

== Trivia ==
- Currently, Brackenfell (together with Kuilsrivier) uses the prefix "CFR-" in their registered motor vehicles (since approximately 2000 the prefix "CF-" which had formerly been allocated to Grahamstown has also been allocated to these suburbs).
- Kanonkop (directly translated to cannon head) Brackenfell's highest point in Ruwari, was used as a signal point with its signal cannons in the 1700s. Cannons can be seen at Brackenfell High School and Bastion Primary School.
