= N21 (South Africa) =

Proposed road in South Africa

National route N21
- Proposed route map

Route information
- Maintained by SANRAL

Location
- Country: South Africa
- Provinces: Western Cape
- Municipalities: City of Cape Town

Highway system
- Numbered routes of South Africa
← N18	→ R21

The N21 is a proposed national route in the City of Cape Town, South Africa. It is also known as the Peninsula Expressway ring road. Once complete, it will link the northern suburbs on the Atlantic seaboard (Melkbosstrand & Bloubergstrand) with the southern suburbs on False Bay (Muizenberg). The R300 freeway is entirely part of the proposed route (the freeway will be extended at both ends).

== Background ==
=== Proposed route ===
The proposed freeway will include sections of the existing R300 freeway and will be tolled. The name of the consortium involved in the construction of the Expressway is "Penway", short for Peninsula Expressway. The Penway has also become the local nickname for the Expressway.

Explosive growth of the Cape Town metropolitan area, especially in terms of local and international tourism, the wine industry, and the film industry, has pushed the traffic situation to a critical point.

=== Environment ===
A number of environmental impact studies have been done, to determine whether new sections of the freeway will upset the delicate ecological systems in the Cape Town area. New sections will run south of the N2 towards Zeekoevlei, which is a wetland area, and north of the N1, up to the area near Melkbosstrand.

== Projects ==
=== Project R300 ===
During the 1990s and 2000s, the national road agency and Western Cape Department of Transport and Public Works began the final construction of the R300, the first section of the highway.

=== Project N21 ===
The Peninsula Expressway will have junctions with three National Roads, the N1, the N2, and the N7 as well as the M3 and the M5 which are Cape Town metropolitan freeways.

In August 2022 the Western Cape Department of Transport and Public Works announced the launch of an environmental impact assessment for the extension of the R300 from its current terminus at the N1 northwards to the R302 (Wellington Road). Grading and a road reserve currently exist in this section, and ramp connections are proposed at the M73 (De Bron Road), Legato Drive, and the R302.

== Opposition ==
The project to extend the R300 has been opposed by some members of society due to them wanting to preserve some of the areas in which the proposed road is meant to pass (such as wetlands and sanctuaries). The City of Cape Town government along with the Government of the Western Cape are also against the plan to make the freeway a toll road.

== See also ==
- Transport in South Africa
- Western Cape Department of Transport and Public Works
