= Kuils River =

Kuils River: Kuilsrivier
- Town
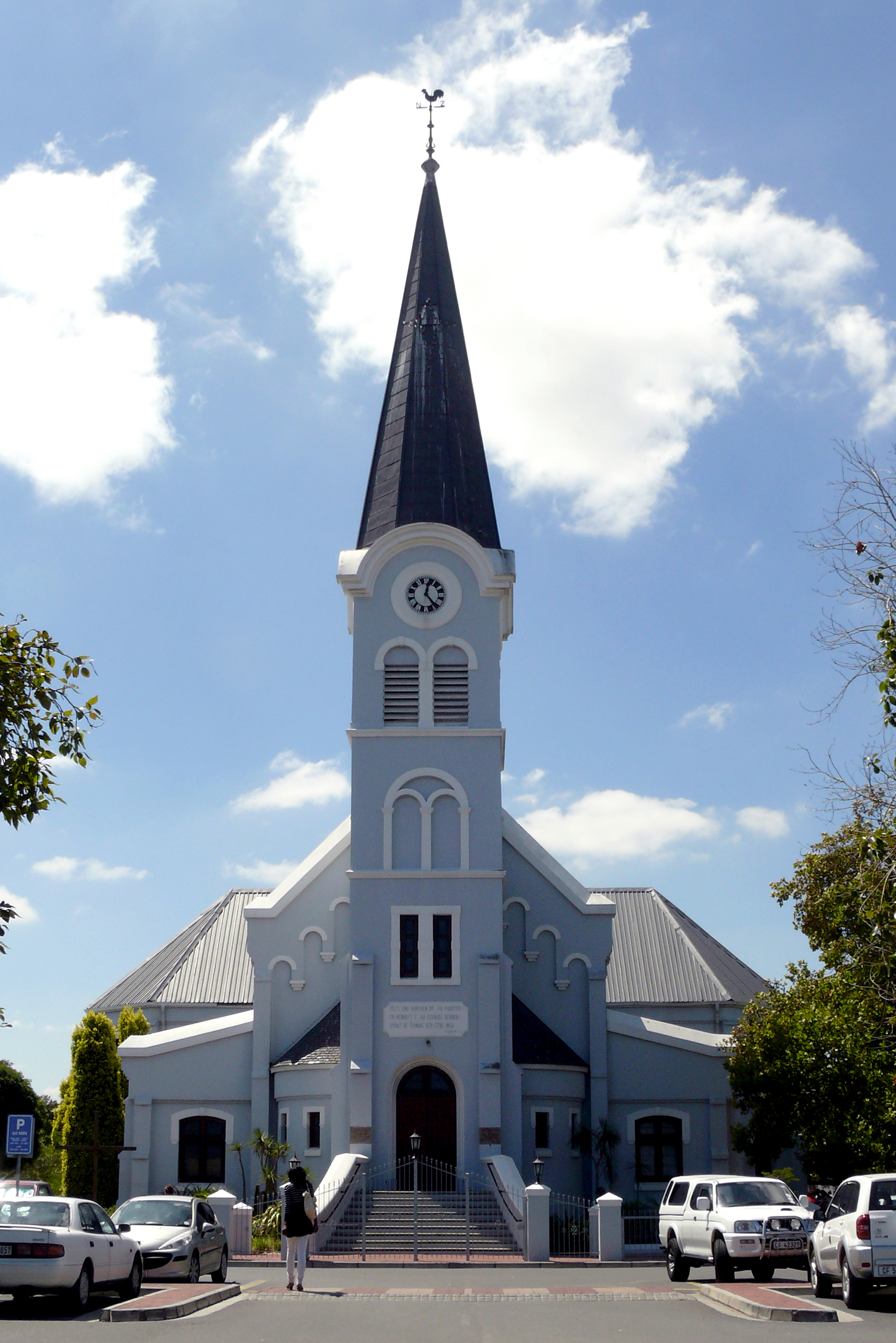
- Dutch Reformed Church, Kuilsrivier

- Location within Western Cape Location within South Africa Location within Africa
- Coordinates: 33.9414°S 18.7066°E
- Country: South Africa
- Province: Western Cape
- Municipality: City of Cape Town
- Established: 1898

Area
  - Total: 39.86 km^{2} (15.39 sq mi)

Population (2011)
  - Total: 46,685
  - Density: 1,171/km^{2} (3,033/sq mi)

Racial makeup (2011)
  - Black African: 11.4%
  - Coloured: 53.1%
  - Indian/Asian: 0.9%
  - White: 32.6%
  - Other: 1.9%

First languages (2011)
  - Afrikaans: 60.2%
  - English: 33.2%
  - Xhosa: 3.2%
  - Other: 3.4%
- Time zone: UTC+2 (SAST)
- Postal code (street): 7580
- PO box: 7579

Kuils River (Afrikaans: Kuilsrivier) is a town in the Western Cape, South Africa, 25 km (15 miles) east of Cape Town and 20 km (12 miles) west of Stellenbosch at the gateway of the Cape Winelands. It is also the name of the main tributary of the Eerste River, and forms part of the Northern Suburbs zone of the City of Cape Town.

== Origin ==
Originally named De Boss, Kuils River was a refreshment post of the Dutch East India Company in 1680, also known as de Kuijlen. In 1700 the farm Leeuwenhof and other parts of de Kuijlen were sold to Olof Bergh.

== Developments during the 19th and 20th century ==
It started to develop into a village. A church was founded by Rhenish Missionary Society in 1843 in Sarepta. A proper road was built in 1845, a railway station in 1862 and a school in 1898. In 1898 stands were sold for residential development. On 4 December 1950 it attained municipal status. The town takes its name from the nearby river, in which there are many pools, or kuile (Dutch for dams).

== Administration and location ==
Kuils River is a level two administrative region, and is close to Stellenbosch. It is located near the intersection of the M12 and the R102.

Kuils River is home to the respective Alta du Toit and Jan Kriel Schools, the former, for mentally challenged children and the latter for children with special educational needs. Kuils River is the birthplace of Herman Charles Bosman (3 February 1905); journalist, poet and author. He is regarded as one of South Africa's greatest ever writers (in English).

The industrial area Blackheath is in Kuils River.

== Transport ==
=== Roads ===
Kuilsrivier lies just off the R300 (Kuils River Freeway), running north–south from the N1 in Brackenfell to the N2 and the M7 in Mitchells Plain. However, the main route through the town is the R102 (Van Riebeeck Road), connecting to Bellville in the west and Somerset West in the south-east.

Kuilsrivier is also served by a network of metropolitan routes such as: the M12 (Stellenbosch Arterial; Polkadraai Road), connecting Stellenbosch with the Cape Town International Airport and Elsiesrivier; the M23 (Bottelary Road) connecting Stellenbosch with Bellville; the M32 (Nooiensfontein Road) connecting Kuilsrivier with Blue Downs; and the M100 (Saxdowns Road) connecting Kuilsrivier with Brackenfell.

== Coat of arms ==
Kuils River was a municipality from 1950 to 1996. The town council assumed a coat of arms, designed by Ivan Mitford-Barberton, in 1955 and registered it with the Cape Provincial Administration in January 1956.

The shield was divided into three horizontal sections: (1) a running buck on a silver background, (2) a golden yoke on a red background, and (3) four silver and blue stripes with wavy edges. The crest was a bull's head, and the motto Via trita via tuta.

== Notable residents ==
- Frederic Creswell, South African Labour Party politician and Minister of Defence from 1924 to 1933.
