= National routes in South Africa =

National Roads in South Africa

National Routes in South Africa
- National route markers for N2 and N5

- Map of National Routes In South Africa

System information
- Length: 12,978 km (8,064 mi)
- Formed: 1975

Highway names
- National routes: Nxx
- Provincial routes: Rxx
- Metropolitan routes: Mxx

System links
- Numbered routes of South Africa

National routes in South Africa are a class of trunk roads and freeways which connect major cities. They form the highest category in the South African route numbering scheme, and are designated with route numbers beginning with "N", from N1 to N18. Most segments of the national route network are officially proclaimed National Roads that are maintained by the South African National Roads Agency (SANRAL), but some segments are maintained by provincial or local road authorities.

The system was mostly built during the 1970s by the National Party government of South Africa, although construction of new roads and repairs of existing stretches continue today. The system was modeled on the United States Interstate Highway network.

Although the terms National Road and National Route are sometimes regarded as synonymous, they have distinct meanings, and not all national routes are National Roads, while some "R"-numbered routes are proclaimed National Roads.

== Definition ==
National routes are defined and numbered by the Route Numbering and Road Traffic Signs Sub Committee within the Roads Co-ordinating Body, an organisation which contains representatives from road authorities in national, provincial and local government. The term "national road" is frequently used to refer to a national route, but technically a "national road" is any road maintained by the South African National Roads Agency (SANRAL) and need not necessarily form part of a national route, and there are "R" routes that are proclaimed National Roads. There are also road segments of the national route network that are maintained by provincial or local authorities rather than SANRAL, and are thus not National Roads.

== Table of routes ==
National Routes are denoted with the letter N followed by a number indicating the specific route. On maps and some signage, national routes are shown by a pentagon with the number of the road inside. There are fifteen declared national routes, which are listed below.

Number	Length (km)	Length (mi)	Southern or western terminus	Northern or eastern terminus	Formed	Removed
N1	1940	1,210	Cape Town–Paarl-Worcester–Laingsburg-Beaufort West–Colesberg–Bloemfontein–Kroonstad–Johannesburg–Roodepoort–Pretoria-Bela Bela–Polokwane–Musina–Beit Bridge–(Beitbridge, Zimbabwe)		—	—
N2	2255	1,401	Cape Town–Somerset West–George–Gqeberha-Makhanda–Qonce–East London–Mthatha–Kokstad–Port Shepstone–Durban–KwaDukuza–Empangeni–eMkhondo–Ermelo		—	—
N3	578	359	Durban–Pietermaritzburg–Harrismith–Johannesburg		—	—
N4	718	446	(Lobatse, Botswana)–Skilpadshek–Zeerust–Rustenburg–Pretoria–eMalahleni–Mbombela–Komatipoort–(Maputo, Mozambique)		—	—
N5	235	146	Winburg–Bethlehem–Harrismith		—	—
N6	538	334	East London–Komani–Aliwal North–Bloemfontein		—	—
N7	666	414	Cape Town–Clanwilliam–Springbok–Vioolsdrif–(Keetmanshoop, Namibia)		—	—
N8	583	362	Groblershoop–Kimberley–Bloemfontein–Ladybrand–Maseru Bridge–(Maseru, Lesotho)		—	—
N9	517	321	George–Graaff-Reinet–Middelburg (EC)–Colesberg		—	—
N10	1000	620	Gqeberha–Cradock–Middelburg (EC)–De Aar–Prieska–Upington–Nakop–(Keetmanshoop, Namibia)		—	—
N11	773	480	Ladysmith–Newcastle–Volksrust–Ermelo–Middelburg (MP)–Mokopane–Groblersbrug–(Palapye, Botswana)		—	—
N12	1342	834	George–Oudtshoorn–Beaufort West–Kimberley–Klerksdorp–Potchefstroom–Johannesburg–eMalahleni		—	—
N14	1186	737	Springbok–Upington–Vryburg–Krugersdorp–Pretoria		—	—
N17	330	210	Johannesburg–Springs–Ermelo–Oshoek–(Mbabane, Eswatini)		—	—
N18	317	197	Warrenton–Vryburg–Mahikeng–Ramatlabama–(Lobatse, Botswana)		—	—
N21	—	—	Peninsula Expressway Proposed c-shaped ring road in Cape Town that will connect Melkbosstrand to Muizenberg via Durbanville, Bellville and Mitchell's Plain. It will be a toll road and it will include the current R300 freeway as well as extensions at either end of that freeway.		proposed	—
Proposed and unbuilt

== Earlier scheme ==
An earlier scheme, deviating considerably from the current numbering, is described in the 1970 Shell Road Atlas of South Africa and other contemporaneous sources:

- N1 - equivalent to the current N9 from George to Colesberg, and then the current N1 from there to Beitbridge (with deviations as some newer parts had yet to be built)
- N2 - equivalent to the section of the current N2 from Cape Town to Durban
- N3 - equivalent to the current N3 from Durban to Ladysmith, then following the current N11 to Volksrust, and the current R23 from there to Heidelberg, and then continuing equivalent to the N3 until its end in Johannesburg
- N4 - equivalent to the section of the current N4 from Pretoria to Komatipoort
- N5 - equivalent to the current N5 but from Winburg past Harrismith to Ladysmith (the latter part now signed as the N3)
- N6 - equivalent to the current N6, except that it begins from King William's Town, the section from there to Stutterheim now being the R346, and ending in Reddersburg.
- N7 - equivalent to the section of the current N10 from Ncanaha to just past Middelburg
- N8 - equivalent to the section of the current R64 from Kimberley to Bloemfontein
- N9 - equivalent to the section of the current N1 from Cape Town to Colesberg
- N10 - equivalent to the section of the current R56 between Kokstad and Pietermaritzburg
- N11 - equivalent to the current N7 from Cape Town to the Namibia border
- N12 - equivalent to the section of the current N12 from George to Beaufort West
- N13 - equivalent to the section of the current N12 from Three Sisters to Johannesburg
- N14 - equivalent to the section of the current N2 from Durban to Eswatini
- N15 - equivalent to the section of the current R75 from Port Elizabeth to Uitenhage
- N16 - equivalent to the section of the current N3 between Heidelberg and Harrismith
- N17 - equivalent to the section of the current N10 between Noupoort and Namibia
- N18 - equivalent to the section of the current R61 from Queenstown to Port St. Johns
- N19 - equivalent to the section of the current R56 from south of Jamestown to Kokstad

== See also ==
- Provincial routes (South Africa)
- Regional routes (South Africa)
- Johannesburg Freeways
- Durban Transportation
- Trans-African Highway network
