= Mfuleni =

Cape Flats suburb of Cape Town

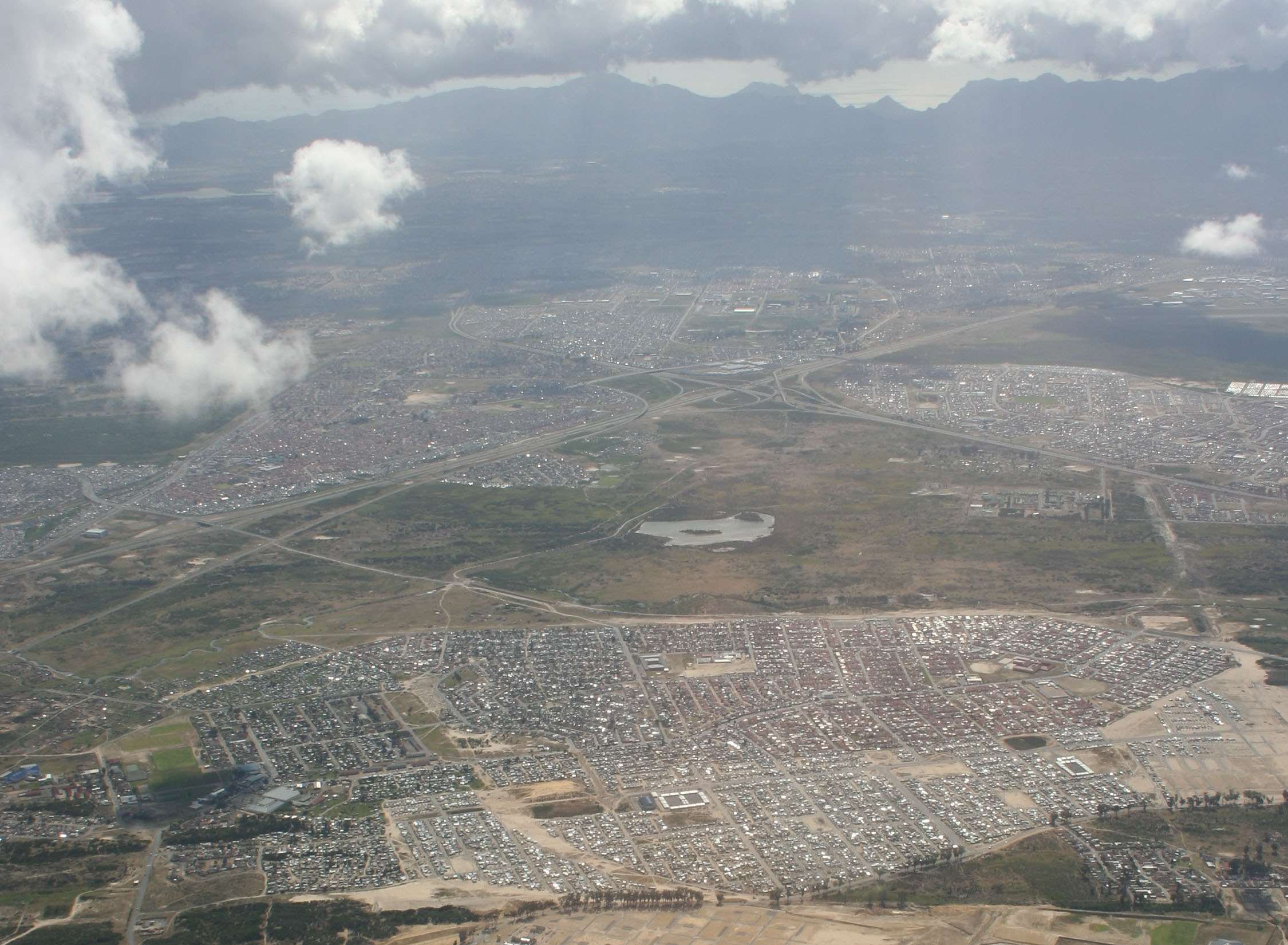
- An aerial photograph of Mfuleni in the foreground stretching to the west towards Table Mountain. Ikweze Park (on the left) and Delft (to the right) are situated beyond.

- Location within Western Cape Location within South Africa Location within Africa
- Coordinates: 33°59′41″S 18°40′33″E
- Country: South Africa
- Province: Western Cape
- Municipality: City of Cape Town
- Main Place: Cape Town

Government
  - Councillor: Thembisile Bathembu (Ward 108) (ANC)

Area
  - Total: 13.46 km^{2} (5.20 sq mi)

Population (2011)
  - Total: 52,274
  - Density: 3,884/km^{2} (10,060/sq mi)

Racial makeup (2011)
  - Black African: 95.9%
  - Coloured: 3.0%
  - Indian/Asian: 0.1%
  - White: 0.2%
  - Other: 0.8%

First languages (2011)
  - Xhosa: 85.9%
  - Afrikaans: 3.4%
  - Sotho: 3.0%
  - English: 2.8%
  - Other: 4.9%
- Time zone: UTC+2 (SAST)
- 7100 (street): n/a
- PO box: Postal Code
- Area code: 021

Mfuleni is a relatively new township about 32 kilometres from central Cape Town, South Africa. It is a predominantly Black township, although there are also some Coloured members of the community.

Mfuleni is a suburb of Blue Downs area and is close to the sprawling township of Khayelitsha and also next to the new suburb of Malibu Village. Around 52,300 people live in this township. Most were moved there from the late 1990s following flooding and fires in different townships across the Western Cape, such as Philippi, Nyanga and Khayelitsha. Hence, the mixed nature of the community here. Unemployment, HIV/AIDS and crime are some of the most pressing problems in this poor township.

Recently, the Department of Local government and Housing with its partners established a new housing project which built an additional 165 houses.
