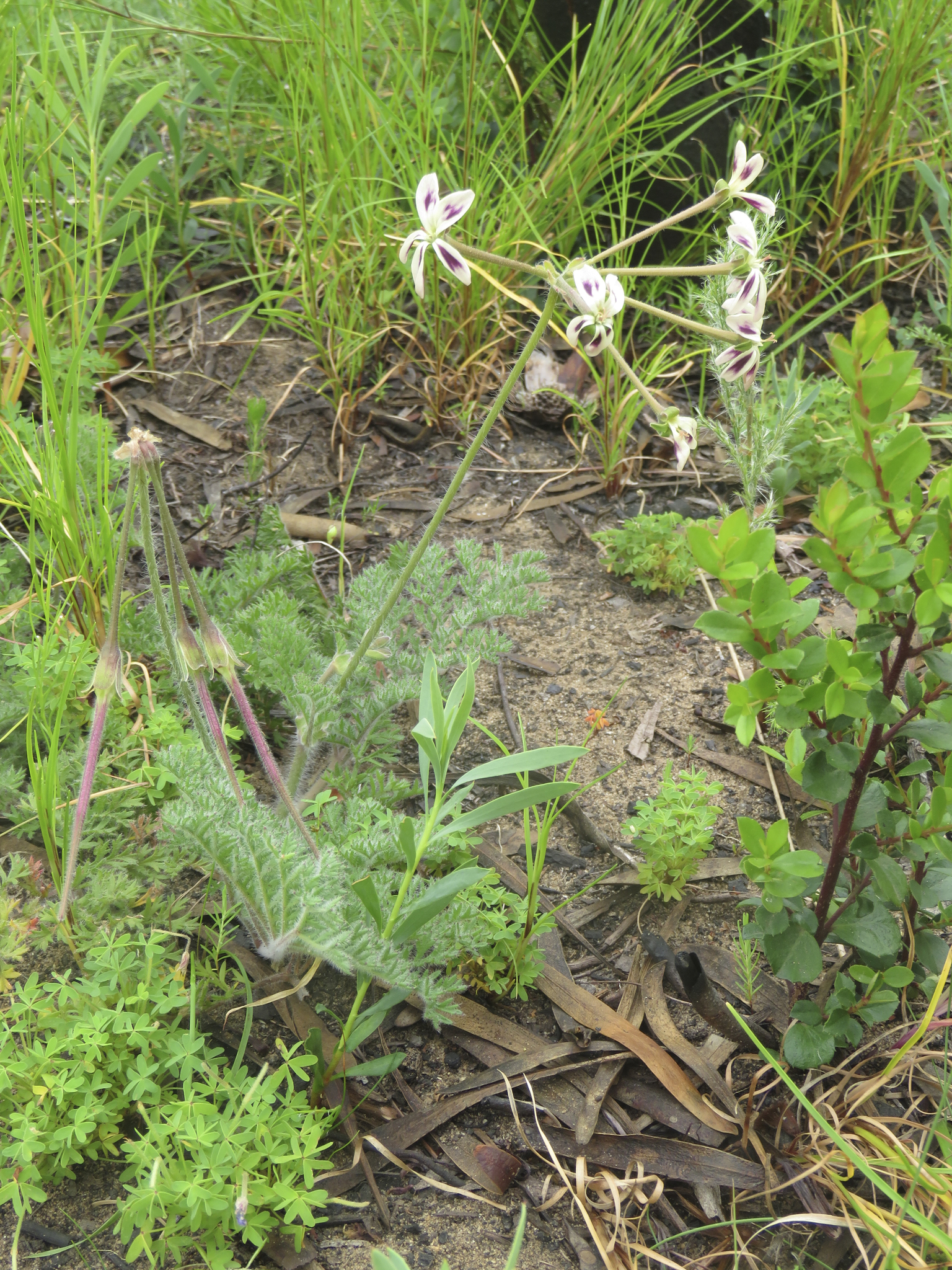

Scientific classification
- Kingdom: Plantae
- Clade: Tracheophytes
- Clade: Angiosperms
- Clade: Eudicots
- Clade: Rosids
- Order: Geraniales
- Family: Geraniaceae
- Genus: Pelargonium
- Species: P. triste

Binomial name
- Pelargonium triste (L.) L'Her.

= Pelargonium triste =

Species of flowering plant

Pelargonium triste, is a geophyte with flowering stems of about 25 cm (9.8 in) high on average, that is assigned to the Stork's bill family. It has hairy, divided and softly feathered leaves that are about twice as long as wide, resemble carrot leaves, and emerge from the tuberous rootstock directly at ground level. The bracts on the flowering stems are usually much smaller than the leaves at ground level. It carries inconspicuous, star-shaped flowers, each with a "spur" that is merged with the flower stalk, with five free green sepals, 5 pale yellow petals, 10 filaments, only 7 of them initially carrying an anther and a style with 5 curved branches. The flowers are crowded in umbels, and mostly there are slight to intense maroon to black markings that may be small or cover the entire petal except for a narrow line along the margins. In the evening, the flowers start to smell like cloves. Flowers may be found practically year round, but most proficiently from September to December. As typical for many species in the Stork's bill family, its fruits resemble the neck, head and bill of a stork. It is known as the night-scented pelargonium in English, kaneeltjie, pypkaneel or rooiwortel in Afrikaans and wit n/eitjie in the Khoi language.

== Description ==
The night-scented pelargonium is a geophyte, usually about 25 cm (9.8 in), exceptionally up to 50 cm (20 in) high, that loses all above ground parts when it enters dormancy during the dry, hot summer. It lacks spines. From the subterranean rootstock emerge tuberous roots. The stems are hard and woody at their base and succulent towards their tip, initially green but eventually brown, and rough due to the scars left by discarded stipules and petioles. It is up to 15 cm (5.9 in) long and 0.5–1 cm (0.20–0.39 in) thick. The leaves in the basal rosette look somewhat like those of a carot and are at least twice as long as wide, 10–45 cm (3.9–17.7 in) long and 4–15 cm (1.6–5.9 in) wide, on a petiole of up to 12 cm (4.7 in) long. These leaves may be upright or lay down. They are herbaceous, variably covered in short glandular hairs between short, whitish hairs. The rosette leaves are pinnately divided, the segments itself mostly further pinnately divided or incised in linear leaflets or lobes, up to four times in total. The highest order leaflets are usually about 1 mm wide, but up to 8 mm wide in less divided leaves. The base of the segments is wedge-shaped or narrow into a stalk while the tips are rounded or squared-off, the margins entire and rolled upwards. The stipules are heart-shaped or oval with pointy tips, 5–8 mm (0.20–0.31 in) long and 6–10 mm (0.24–0.39 in) wide, thin and pliable becoming dry, and initially densely pubescent on the underside.

The flowers are with 6 to 15 together in an umbel-like cluster on top of a sturdy unbranched peduncle of 5–25 cm (2.0–9.8 in) long and maximally 2.5 mm (0.098 in) in diameter. The part of the stalk of the individual flowers that contains the hollow, spur-like hypanthium is 30–55 mm (1.2–2.2 in) long, much longer than the remainder of the pedicel at its base that is up to 4 mm (0.16 in) long. The pedicel is densely set with straight, perpendicular (or strigose) hairs and with glandular hairs. The five sepals are 5–7 mm (0.20–0.28 in) long and 1–3 mm (0.039–0.118 in) wide, narrowly oval in shape with pointy tips, the outside densely strigose and some glandular hairs, the inside hairless, the margins with a row of hairs (or ciliate), dull green to yellowish green in colour and sometimes with russet coloured and slightly transparent margins. The five petals are almost equal in size and spade-shape with rounded tips, 10–18 mm (0.39–0.71 in) long, pale yellow in colour but often adorned with a vague or intense burgundy to purplish black blotch that may leave only the outer margin yellow. The posterior two petals are 4–8 mm (0.16–0.31 in) wide, strongly curved backwards at their base and somewhat curved forwards at their tip. The anterior three petals are 2.5–6.0 mm (0.098–0.236 in) wide and less markedly reflexed. Four long and three short filaments initially carry anthers (best determined in a bud), three filaments are sterile. The pollen is bright yellow in colour. The pale green, pear-shaped ovary is 3.5–4.5 mm (0.14–0.18 in) long and about 2.0 mm (0.079 in) wide, densely covered in hairs pointing to the tip. It is topped by a 2.0–2.5 mm (0.079–0.098 in) long style, that branches into five, reddish, curved stigmas.

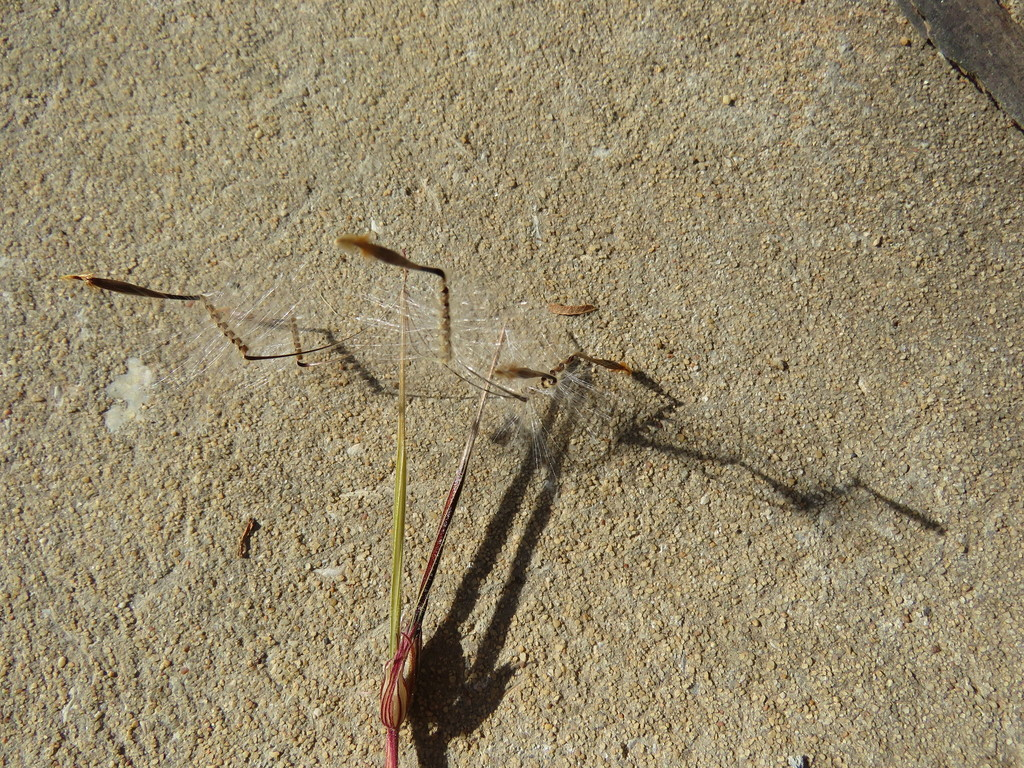
Fruit and mericarps, showing plumes that assist distribution by wind and the coiled axil that aids in hygroscopic drilling to plant the seed

Like in all Geraniaceae, the fruit is reminiscent of the head and bill of a stork. It is schizocarp and consists of five units or mericarps. At the base of each mericarp is the enclosed seed that is 7–10 mm (0.28–0.39 in) long in the night-scented pelargonium, and a tail of 35–45 mm (1.4–1.8 in) long. The mericarps of Pelargonium are light and carry feather-like hairs to act like parachutes when dry and enable distribution by the wind. The awns of the mericarps coil when drying and uncoil when getting moist. These motions screw the seeds into the ground and in crevices.

=== Differences from related species ===
All seven species assigned to the section Polyactium, subsection Polyactium share a substantial underground tuber, and pseudo-umbels with evening-scented, star-like flowers with pale yellow corollas, with or without dark markings. Pelargonium multiradiatum and P. anethifolium also have leaves divided in linear segments, but these leaves are about as long as wide, and only have inconspicuous hairs on the upper surface. P. multiradiatum has 5 fertile stamens, P. anethifolium 6, and P. triste 7. P. pulverulentum, has incised, long heart-shaped leaves, P. radulifolium has pinnate or pinnatifid leaves but with wedge-shaped segments. P. pillansii has glaucous, heart-shaped leaves that are entire, with 3 or more lobes or pinnately compounded. P. lobatum has soft-felty, heart-shaped, simple to 5-lobed leaves.

== Taxonomy ==
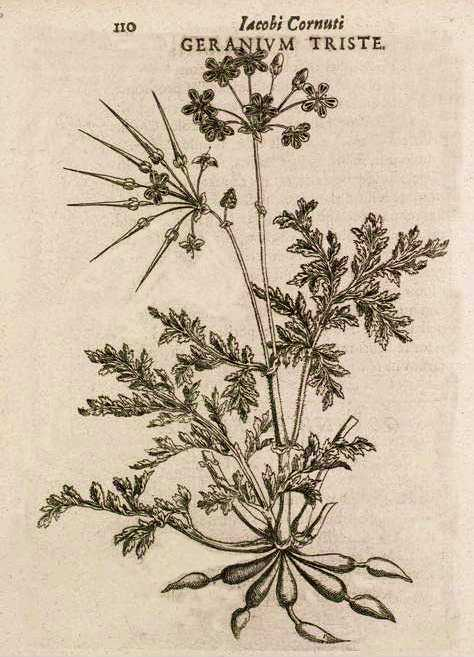
Copper engraving in the Canadensium plantarum of 1635, probably after a specimen collected by the French explorer De Beaulieu at Table Bay on 24 May 1622

Probably already before 1600, the night-scented pelargonium arrived at the botanical garden of Leiden in the Netherlands. It was originally known as Geranium indicum Noctu Odoratum, which translates to Night-scented Indian Geranium. Since the plant was brought by a ship returning from Asia, it was erroneously thought to originate in India. It must have been picked up on the way back from the Cape, where the species naturally occurs. It was first pictured in the Canadensium plantarum, a book written by Jacques-Philippe Cornut that was published in 1635. The night-scented pelargonium is polymorphic, which prompted later botanists to distinguish several species, all of which are nowadays taken together again. The species was also assigned to different genera over time, initially it was included in Geranium, followed by Pelargonium, later Polyactium and Geraniospermum, but the latter two are now considered part of Pelargonium again.

In 1753, Carl Linnaeus assigned the name Geranium triste to a collection of plants that included both the night-scented pelargonium and the vine-leaved pelargonium. In 1759, Nicolaas Laurens Burman recognised vine-leaved pelargonium as sufficiently different to consider it an other species and named it Geranium lobalum (now Pelargonium lobatum), but he also distinguished Geranium pinnatifidum that same year. Burman the younger described Geranium flavum in 1768. Also in 1768, Philip Miller described Geranium pastinacifolium in the 8th edition of The Gardeners Dictionary. Johan Andreas Murray described Geranium daucifolium in 1780. In 1789, Charles Louis L'Héritier de Brutelle established the new genus Pelargonium, that is amongst others characterised by zygomorph flowers, with 10 stamens, only 2-7 of which carry an anther and the posterior sepal is fused with the pedicel to form a nectar tube. This differs from Geranium that has actinomorph flowers with 10 fertile stamens and without a spur. He named the species Pelargonium triste and P. flavum. Henry Cranke Andrews described Geranium quinquevulnerum in The botanist's repository in the year 1800. in 1806, Christiaan Hendrik Persoon assigned it to L'Héritier's genus and called it Pelargonium quinquevulnerum. Nikolaus Joseph von Jacquin described Pelargonium daucoides in 1806. In 1814, John Sims distinguished Pelargonium triste var. filipendulifolium, which Robert Sweet raised to the level of species in 1821 making the combination Pelargonium filipendulifolium. In 1824, Sweet described Pelargonium millefoliatum. Also in 1824, Swiss botanist Augustin Pyramus de Candolle reduced the status of Pelargonium daucoides to P. flavum var. daucoides. Johann Centurius Hoffmannsegg mentions in Verzeichniss der Pflanzenkulturen 87 (1824–1826), the names Pelargonium carotaefolium and Pelargonium moestum, but without descriptions. In 1835, Christian Friedrich Ecklon and Karl Ludwig Philipp Zeyher assigned the night-scented pelargonium to their newly erected genus, and named several forms Polyactium coniophyllum, Polyactium daucifolium, Polyactium filipendulifolium, Polyactium flavum, Polyactium papaverifolium and Polyactium triste. They also distinguish Polyactium multiradiatum, but this is different from Pelargonium multiradiatum as described by Johann Christoph Wendland. Ernst Gottlieb von Steudel in 1841 moved Polyactium papaverifolium and Polyactium coniophyllum, and made the new combinations Pelargonium papaverifolium and Pelargonium coniophyllum and mentions Pelargonium tuberosum but without describing it. In 1860, William Henry Harvey described Pelargonium triste var. laxatum. In 1891, Otto Kuntze assigned the species to his new genus Geraniospermum, creating the new combinations Geraniospermum triste, G. flavum and G. quinquevulnerum respectively.

The night-scented pelargonium has been assigned to section Polyactium and subsection Polyactium. The name of the genus Pelargonium is derived from the Ancient Greek word πελαργός (pelargos), meaning stork, for the likeness of the fruit to the neck, head and bill of that bird. The species name triste is derived from the Latin tristis, meaning dull, a reference to the colour of the petals.

== Distribution, habitat and ecology ==
The night-scented pelargonium is common in parts of the Northern and Western Cape Provinces of South Africa, from the Cape Peninsula in the southwest to the Orange River in the north and Mossel Bay in the east. It can be found on coastal sands, but is also present on slopes up to an elevation of 1,800 m (5,900 ft). Across this entire region, most precipitation falls during the winter half year, but the annual rainfall varies over its distribution area from about 100 mm (3.9 in) to over 600 mm (24 in). It is most apparent in open areas, but as the fynbos develops, the plants get shaded by the surrounding shrubs and stop flowering. The large underground tuber however enables the plants to survive for many years and reappear after a fire has destroyed the above ground vegetation. The deep hypantium and night scents are suggestive that the flowers are pollinated by night-active, long-tongued insects such as moths. In Pelargonium, the seed capsule splits open along its length when dry, so releasing the seeds. The seed is dispersed on the wind carried by its feathery plumes. Each seed has a section in its tail that is spiraled when dry and uncoils when moist. Once the seed settles on the soil, it drills into the soil as it coils and uncoils with varying moisture. The continued survival of the night-scented pelargonium is considered to be of least concern.

== Use ==
John Tradescant the Younger, a well-known plant collector, took the night-scented pelargonium to England in 1632, making it one of the first species from the Cape that was cultivated in the United Kingdom. The tubers are rich in tannin and are used in Namaqualand for tanning leather, which gives it a reddish-brown color. Infusions of the tubers have been used in traditional medicine to treat dysentery and diarrhea.
