= Mayoral Committee =

In South Africa, the Mayoral Committee of a municipality is the executive cabinet of the municipal council. Section 60 of the Local Government: Municipal Structures Act, 1998 requires any executive mayor to appoint a mayoral committee, provided that the municipal council has more than nine members. Members of the Mayoral Committee (MMCs) are appointed by the mayor from among the municipal councillors. They are charged with assisting and advising the executive mayor, who may additionally delegate specific responsibilities or executive powers to them.

== See also ==
- Executive Council (South Africa)
