= City of Cape Town =

Metropolitan municipality in South Africa

City of Cape Town Stad Kaapstad (Afrikaans) Isixeko saseKapa (Xhosa)
- Metropolitan municipality
- City of Cape Town Metropolitan Municipality
- Cape Town Civic Centre, the seat of the city's local government

- Flag Logo

- Location in the Western Cape
- Interactive map of City of Cape Town
- Coordinates: 34°0′S 18°30′E
- Country: South Africa
- Province: Western Cape
- Seat: Cape Town
- Wards: 116

Government
  - Type: Municipal council
  - Mayor: Geordin Hill-Lewis (DA)
  - Deputy Mayor: Eddie Andrews (DA)

Area
  - Total: 2,445 km^{2} (944 sq mi)

Population (2022)
  - Total: 4,772,846
  - Density: 1,952/km^{2} (5,056/sq mi)

Racial makeup (2011)
  - Black African: 38.6%
  - Coloured: 42.4%
  - Indian/Asian: 1.4%
  - White: 15.7%
  - Other: 1.9%

First languages (2011)
  - Afrikaans: 34.9%
  - Xhosa: 29.2%
  - English: 27.8%
  - Other languages: 8.1%
- Time zone: UTC+2 (SAST)
- Municipal code: CPT
- HDI: 0.781 – high (2021)

The City of Cape Town (Afrikaans: Stad Kaapstad; Xhosa: Isixeko saseKapa) is a metropolitan municipality that forms the local government of Cape Town and surrounding areas. As of 2022 it has a population of 4,772,846.

The headquarters of the municipality, and the chamber of the metro's administrative body, the Cape Town City Council, are at the Civic Centre, in the Foreshore.

== History ==
Cape Town first received local self-government in 1839, with the promulgation of a municipal ordinance by the government of the Cape Colony. When it was created, the Cape Town municipality governed only the central part of the city known as the City Bowl, and as the city expanded, new suburbs became new municipalities, until by 1902 there were 10 separate municipalities in the Cape Peninsula.

During the 20th century, many of the inner suburban municipalities became unsustainable; in 1913 the first major unification took place when the municipalities of Cape Town, Green Point and Sea Point, Woodstock, Mowbray, Rondebosch, Claremont, Maitland, and Kalk Bay were unified to create the first City of Cape Town. In 1927 the municipality of Wynberg was also merged with Cape Town, with the result that all of the Southern Suburbs were incorporated into the City.

Many new municipalities were established during the 20th century. Durbanville achieved municipal status in 1901, Goodwood in 1938, Parow in 1939, Bellville and Fish Hoek in 1940, Pinelands in 1948, Kuils River in 1950, Milnerton in 1955, Kraaifontein in 1957, Gordon's Bay in 1961, and Brackenfell in 1970. In 1979 Bellville was upgraded to city status.

The areas not included in a municipality were governed by divisional councils. Most of the Cape metropolitan area fell under the Divisional Council of the Cape, while the eastern parts around Brackenfell, Kuils River and the Helderberg area formed part of the Divisional Council of Stellenbosch, and an area in the northeast around Kraaifontein formed part of the Divisional Council of Paarl.

In earlier years the right to vote in local elections was not restricted by race (see Cape Qualified Franchise), but the policies of the apartheid government aimed for complete segregation of local government. A 1962 amendment to the Group Areas Act introduced management committees for the areas designated for coloured and Indian residents. These management committees were subordinate to the existing local authority—either a municipality or the divisional council.

From 1972, no new non-white voters could be registered as voters for municipal or divisional councils, and existing non-white voters lost their voting rights when a management committee was established for the area where they lived.

In 1982 the Black Local Authorities Act created elected town councils for black communities. Five such councils were established in the Cape metropolitan areas. They were generally regarded as under-resourced and unsustainable, and were opposed by the United Democratic Front and other civic organisations. Turnout in BLA elections was very low.

In 1987 the divisional councils of the Cape, Paarl and Stellenbosch were dissolved and the Western Cape Regional Services Council (RSC) was created in their place. The RSC councils were indirectly elected, consisting of representatives nominated by all the local authorities within its area, including municipalities, management committees and town councils.

The Cape Rural Council represented the rural areas of the RSC that were not included in any local authority. Also in 1987, an act of the House of Assembly allowed the creation of local councils for white communities in peri-urban areas.

Thus at the end of apartheid in 1994, there were over 50 different local authorities in existence in the metropolitan area, listed below.

Local authorities in 1994
- Western Cape Regional Services Council (RSC)
  - Cape Rural Council
- Cities
  - City of Cape Town
  - City of Bellville
- Municipalities
  - Brackenfell Municipality
  - Durbanville Municipality
  - Fish Hoek Municipality
  - Goodwood Municipality
  - Gordon's Bay Municipality
  - Kraaifontein Municipality
  - Kuils River Municipality
  - Milnerton Municipality
  - Parow Municipality
  - Pinelands Municipality
  - Simon's Town Municipality
  - Somerset West Municipality
  - Strand Municipality
- Management Committees (indicating in brackets the local authority to which they were subordinated)
  - Athlone and District MC (City of Cape Town)
  - Atlantis MC (RSC)
  - Belhar MC (RSC)
  - Cravenby MC (RSC)
  - Elsie's River MC (RSC)
  - Grassy Park MC (RSC)
  - Kensington MC (City of Cape Town)
  - Kraaifontein MC (Kraaifontein Municipality)
  - Macassar MC (RSC)
  - Matroosfontein/Nooitgedacht MC (RSC)
  - Melton Rose/Blue Downs/Delft MC (RSC)
  - Mitchells Plain MC (City of Cape Town)
  - Morningstar MC (Durbanville Municipality)
  - Ocean View MC (RSC)
  - Proteaville MC (City of Bellville)
  - Ravensmead MC (Parow Municipality)
  - Retreat/Steenberg MC (City of Cape Town)
  - Rylands Estate MC (City of Cape Town)
  - Sarepta MC (Kuils River Municipality)
  - Schotschekloof MC (City of Cape Town)
  - Scottsdene MC (RSC)
  - Sir Lowry's Pass MC (RSC)
  - Strand MC (Strand Municipality)
  - Strandfontein MC (City of Cape Town)
  - Temperance Town MC (Gordon's Bay Municipality)
  - Wittebome/Wynberg MC (City of Cape Town)
  - Woodstock/Walmer Estate/Salt River MC (City of Cape Town)
- Town Councils
  - Crossroads Town Council
  - iKapa Town Council (Langa, Gugulethu and Nyanga)
  - Lingelethu West Town Council (Khayelitsha)
  - Lwandle Town Council
  - Mfuleni Town Council
- Local Councils
  - Atlantis Industria LC
  - Bloubergstrand LC
  - Constantia LC
  - Kommetjie LC
  - Llandudno LC
  - Melkbosstrand LC
  - Noordhoek LC
  - Ottery East LC
  - Scarborough LC
- Mamre Board of Management

As part of the post-1994 reforms, municipal government experienced a complete overhaul. The existing local authorities, political parties, ratepayers' organisations, and community organisations were brought together into a negotiating forum. This forum agreed on the creation of a two-level local government system consisting of multiple transitional metropolitan substructures (TMSs), brought together in a transitional metropolitan council named the Cape Metropolitan Council (CMC).

The CMC would replace the Regional Services Council and take over its responsibilities; it would also be responsible for metro-level planning and co-ordination, improving service delivery in disadvantaged areas, and cross-subsidization of poorer areas with revenue from affluent areas. Initially, in a period called the "pre-interim phase", the existing local authorities would become TMSs but their councils would be replaced by councillors nominated by the members of the negotiating forum. This agreement came into effect, and the pre-interim phase began, on 1 February 1995.

The second phase of the transformation, known as the "interim phase" began on 29 May 1996 when local elections were held. The pre-interim TMSs were dissolved, and six new TMSs were established covering the whole metropolitan area: City of Cape Town (Central), City of Tygerberg, South Peninsula Municipality, Blaauwberg Municipality, Oostenberg Municipality, and Helderberg Municipality. The Cape Metropolitan Council continued with its coordinating functions.

In 1998 Parliament enacted legislation (the Municipal Structures Act) determining the final form of local government in post-apartheid South Africa. This legislation determined that metropolitan areas would be governed by unified metropolitan municipalities. Local elections were held on 5 December 2000; the Cape Metropolitan Council and the six interim TMSs were dissolved and replaced by the unified City of Cape Town. It is for this reason that the City of Cape Town is sometimes referred to as the "Unicity".

At the time of the 2000 election, the northern boundary of the metropolitan area was also extended to include Philadelphia, Klipheuwel, and the surrounding farmland.

The current municipality covers Cape Point in the south-west, Gordon's Bay in the south-east, and Atlantis in the north, and includes Robben Island. The remote Prince Edward Islands are deemed to be part of the City of Cape Town, specifically of ward 115.

Local government transition in Cape Town from 1994 to 2000
The situation in 1994, with a large variety of different local authorities divided on the basis of race

The "pre-interim phase" (1995–96), in which local authorities were transformed into Transitional Metropolitan Substructures under the Cape Metropolitan Council (CMC)

The "interim phase" (1996–2000), in which the metropolitan area was divided into six municipalities under the CMC

The formation of the Unicity at the end of 2000, replacing the municipalities and the CMC

== Politics and government ==
=== Council ===
Cape Town is governed by the 235-member Cape Town City Council, which is elected in a system of mixed-member proportional representation. The city is divided into 118 wards, each of which elects a councillor by first-past-the-post voting. The remaining 117 councillors are elected from party lists so that the total number of councillors for each party is proportional to the number of votes received by that party.

The following table shows the results of the 2026 election.

Party	Ward			List			Total seats
Party	Votes	%	Seats	Votes	%	Seats	Total seats
Democratic Alliance	649,759	56.18	86	655,059	56.66	47	133
African National Congress	160,050	13.84	32	162,612	14.07	1	33
Patriotic Alliance	45,965	3.97	0	41,138	3.56	9	9
Economic Freedom Fighters	42,743	3.70	0	43,429	3.76	9	9
Freedom Front Plus	39,140	3.38	0	39,927	3.45	8	8
ActionSA	29,685	2.57	0	33,811	2.92	7	7
Al Jama-ah	27,905	2.41	0	27,043	2.34	6	6
Good	26,168	2.26	0	26,790	2.32	6	6
National Coloured Congress	25,132	2.17	0	26,529	2.29	5	5
United Democratic Movement	13,377	1.16	0	14,495	1.25	3	3
African Christian Democratic Party	14,020	1.21	0	13,386	1.16	3	3
South African Communist Party	11,975	1.04	0	9,011	0.78	2	2
African Transformation Movement	9,327	0.81	0	10,713	0.93	2	2
uMkhonto weSizwe Party	6,812	0.59	0	6,513	0.56	1	1
Africa Restoration Alliance	6,556	0.57	0	5,614	0.49	1	1
Cape Muslim Congress	6,075	0.53	0	4,692	0.41	1	1
Build One South Africa	4,430	0.38	0	4,087	0.35	1	1
Pan Africanist Congress of Azania	3,546	0.31	0	3,517	0.30	1	1
People's Movement for Change	3,572	0.31	0	3,207	0.28	1	1
Independent candidates	5,884	0.51	0				0
African Independent Congress	2,893	0.25	0	2,070	0.18	1	1
Cape Independence Party	2,521	0.22	0	2,042	0.18	1	1
Hopeful Leaders Democrats	1,586	0.14	0	2,226	0.19	1	1
34 other parties	17,382	1.50	0	18,203	1.57	0	0
Total	1,156,503	100.00	118	1,156,114	100.00	117	235
Valid votes	1,156,503	98.80		1,156,114	98.74		
Invalid/blank votes	14,037	1.20		14,746	1.26		
Total votes	1,170,540	100.00		1,170,860	100.00		
Registered voters/turnout	2,158,976	54.22		2,158,976	54.23		

The speaker of the council is Felicity Purchase of the Democratic Alliance.

The council is divided into 24 subcouncils which deal with local functions for between three and six wards. A subcouncil consists of the ward councillors and a similar number of proportionally-elected councillors assigned to the subcouncil.

A subcouncil is chaired by one of the councillors and appoints a manager to run its day-to-day business. A subcouncil does not have any inherent responsibilities in law, but it is entitled to make recommendations to the City Council about anything that affects its area. The City Council may also delegate responsibilities to the subcouncils.

=== Executive ===
The executive authority for the city is vested in an Executive Mayor who is elected by the council. The mayor appoints a mayoral committee whose members oversee various portfolios. A City Manager is appointed as the non-political head of the city's administration.

With the Democratic Alliance (DA) having won an absolute majority of council seats in the election of 1 November 2021, its mayoral candidate Geordin Hill-Lewis, who had been a Member of Parliament since 2011, was elected.

The Mayoral Committee consists of 10 members who are appointed by the Executive Mayor. Each member manages a different area of the local government.

The current city manager is Lungelo Mbandazayo. He had been the acting city manager since the former city manager Achmat Ebrahim, who was appointed in April 2006, resigned in January 2018 amid misconduct allegations. He was formally appointed city manager in April 2018.

The local municipality was one of the four to have passed the 2009-10 audit by the Auditor-General of South Africa, who deemed it to have a clean administration.

=== Electoral history ===
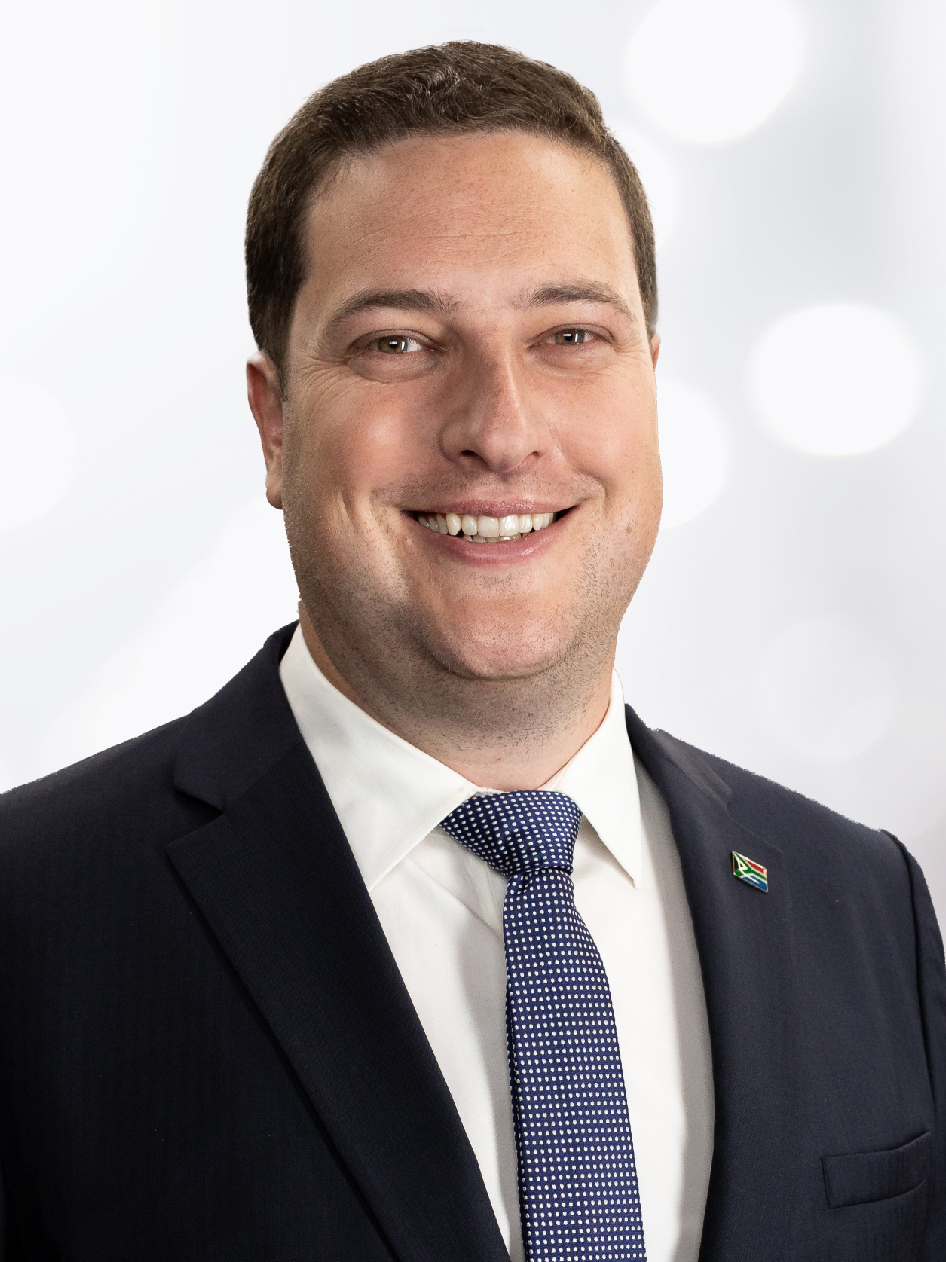
Geordin Hill-Lewis, the current Mayor of Cape Town

The City of Cape Town Metropolitan Municipality in its present form took shape after the 2000 municipal elections. The old Central Cape Town MLC council had been governed by the New National Party (NNP), but they were losing support to the African National Congress (ANC) and the Democratic Party (DP). Fearing further losses, the NNP agreed to contest the upcoming local election in December 2000 together with the DP by forming the Democratic Alliance (DA), with DP and NNP members running as DA candidates.

The DA won Cape Town with an outright majority, and Peter Marais, also a senior member of the provincial NNP, became mayor of the unicity. However, DA leader Tony Leon's attempt to remove Marais from his position in 2001 caused the disintegration of the alliance, and NNP came to ally with the ANC. Marais was replaced as mayor by Gerald Morkel, but Morkel was himself soon ousted during the October 2002 local floor crossing period after a large number of DA councillors had defected to the NNP. Nomaindia Mfeketo of the ANC became mayor supported by an ANC-NNP coalition.

In 2004, after a dismal showing in the general elections that year, the NNP prepared for dissolution and merger with the ANC, and most of its councillors joined the governing party. This gave the ANC an outright majority on the council, which lasted until the next election.

In the 2006 local government election, the DA was the largest single party, ahead of the ANC, but with no party holding a majority. The new Independent Democrats (ID) led by Patricia de Lille was in third place. The African Christian Democratic Party (ACDP) initiated negotiations with five other smaller parties who together formed a kingmaker block of fifteen councillors, collectively known as the Multi-Party Forum parties. Despite the ID voting with the ANC, Helen Zille of the DA was elected executive mayor on 15 March 2006 by a very narrow margin with the support of the Multi-Party Forum. Andrew Arnolds of the ACDP was elected executive deputy mayor and Jacob "Dirk" Smit of the Freedom Front Plus (FF+) was elected speaker.

The initially fragile position of this new DA-led coalition, also known as the Multi-Party Government, was improved in January 2007 with the introduction of the ID following the expulsion of the small Africa Muslim Party for conspiring with the ANC. As a result of the ID's support, the coalition significantly increased its majority, resulting in a much more stable city government. The ID's Charlotte Williams became executive deputy mayor. However, she resigned just a few months later, and the post then went to Grant Haskin of the ACDP in late 2007.

The DA would also bolster its position through by-election victories and floor crossing defections. With the ID and DA together holding a firm council majority, several of the smaller coalition partners were dropped from the city government by the time of the 2009 general elections, including the ACDP and FF+. The DA's Ian Neilson became deputy mayor, while Dirk Smit, who had defected to the DA, retained the position of speaker. Helen Zille left the mayorship the same year to take up the position of premier of the Western Cape, and Dan Plato became mayor.

In 2010, the DA and ID formalized an agreement in which the ID would merge into the DA by 2014. This was prompted in part by the ID's disappointing result in the 2009 general election. As per the agreement, ID ceased to exist at the local level after the 2011 municipal elections with ID members running as DA candidates. DA won a large outright majority in the election, and ID leader Patricia de Lille, who had defeated Plato in an earlier internal election, became the new mayor.

The party extended its lead even further to win a two-thirds majority of the seats on the City of Cape Town council in the 2016 municipal elections, and De Lille was thus sworn in to serve a second term. It was however cut short following her resignation on 31 October 2018 after an extended battle with her party over accusations of covering up corruption, accusations she strongly denied. The previous mayor Dan Plato was chosen as her successor.

The DA's Geordin Hill-Lewis was voted in as mayor after the 2021 local government elections.

=== Mayors ===
The below table contains a list of post-1994 mayors of the City of Cape Town.

Political party	Name	Term of office		Tenure
Democratic Alliance	Peter Marais	December 2000	November 2001	11 months
Democratic Alliance	Gerald Morkel	December 2001	October 2002	10 months
African National Congress	Nomaindia Mfeketo	October 2002	March 2006	3 years, 5 months
Democratic Alliance	Helen Zille	March 2006	April 2009	3 years, 1 month
African Christian Democratic Party	Grant Haskin (acting)	April 2009	May 2009	1 month
Democratic Alliance	Dan Plato	May 2009	May 2011	2 years
Democratic Alliance	Patricia de Lille	June 2011	October 2018	7 years, 4 months
Democratic Alliance	Ian Neilson (acting)	May 2018; October 2018	May 2018; November 2018	0 months 1 month
Democratic Alliance	Dan Plato	November 2018	October 2021	2 years, 11 months
Democratic Alliance	Geordin Hill-Lewis	November 2021	Incumbent	5 years

== Demographics ==
Group	2001 Census	%	2011 Census	%	Change	% Change	2022 Census	%	Change	% Change
Coloured	1,391,859	48.1%	1,585,286	42.4%	193,427 ▲	5.7% ▼	1,670,971	35.1%	85,685 ▲	7.3% ▼
Black African	916,459	31.7%	1,444,939	38.6%	528,480 ▲	6.9% ▲	2,176,332	45.7%	731,393 ▲	7.1% ▲
White	542,435	18.8%	585,831	15.7%	43,396 ▲	3.1% ▼	774,035	16.2%	188,204 ▲	0.5% ▲
Indian or Asian	41,490	1.4%	51,786	1.4%	10,296 ▲	0.0% ▼	75,406	1.6%	23,620 ▲	0.2% ▲
Other	n/a	–	72,184	1.9%	n/a	n/a	69,237	1.5%	-2,947 ▼	0.4% ▼
Total population	2,892,243	100%	3,740,026	100%	847,783 ▲	-	4,772,846	100%	1,032,820 ▲	-

== Geography ==
The municipality has a total area of 2,455 km^{2}.

In 2026, the metro had around 170 suburbs, across eight regions.

Subdivision varies according to purpose. Main places for census purposes may differ from planning districts.

=== Main places ===
The 2001 census divided the municipality into the following main places:

Main places in 2001

Place	Code	Population	Most spoken language
Atlantis	17101	53,820	Afrikaans
Bellville	17102	89,732	Afrikaans
Blue Downs	17103	150,431	Afrikaans
Brackenfell	17104	78,005	Afrikaans
Briza	17105	1,959	English
Cape Town	17106	827,218	Afrikaans
Crossroads	17108	31,527	Xhosa
Dunoon	17109	9,045	Xhosa
Durbanville	17110	40,135	Afrikaans
Eerste River	17111	29,682	Afrikaans
Elsie's River	17112	86,685	Afrikaans
Excelsior	17113	189	Afrikaans
Fisantekraal	17114	4,646	Afrikaans
Fish Hoek	17115	15,851	English
Goodwood	17116	48,128	English
Gordons Bay	17117	2,751	Afrikaans
Guguletu	17118	80,277	Xhosa
Hottentots Holland Nature Reserve	17119	18	Xhosa
Hout Bay	17120	13,253	English
Imizamo Yethu	17121	8,063	Xhosa
Joe Slovo Park	17122	4,567	Xhosa
Khayelitsha	17123	329,002	Xhosa
Kraaifontein	17124	57,911	Afrikaans
Kuilsriver	17125	44,780	Afrikaans
Langa	17126	49,667	Xhosa
Lekkerwater	17127	1,410	Xhosa
Lwandle	17128	9,311	Xhosa
Mamre	17129	7,276	Afrikaans
Masiphumelele	17130	8,249	Xhosa
Melkbosstrand	17131	6,522	Afrikaans
Mfuleni	17132	22,883	Xhosa
Milnerton	17133	81,366	English
Mitchell's Plain	17134	398,650	Afrikaans
Nomzamo	17135	22,083	Xhosa
Noordhoek	17136	3,127	English
Nyanga	17137	58,723	Xhosa
Parow	17138	77,439	Afrikaans
Pella	17139	1,044	Afrikaans
Robben Island	17140	176	Afrikaans
Scarborough	17141	723	English
Simon's Town	17142	7,210	English
Sir Lowry's Pass Village	17143	5,766	Afrikaans
Somerset West	17144	60,606	Afrikaans
Strand	17145	46,446	Afrikaans
Witsand	17146	2,405	Xhosa
Remainder of the municipality	17107	14,498	Afrikaans

=== Planning districts ===
The planning districts are:

- Blaauwberg, which includes subdistricts: Atlantis, Blouberg, Mamre, Melkboschstrand, Table View, and parts of Cape Farms, Goodwood, Milnerton, and Maitland.
- Cape Flats, which includes subdistricts: Athlone, False Bay Coastal Park, Grassy Park, Guguletu, Hanover Park, Manenberg, Ottery, Pelican Park, and parts of Muizenberg, Retreat, and Rondebosch.
- Helderberg, which includes subdistricts: Gordon's Bay, Macassar, Sir Lowry's Pass, Somerset West, Stellenbosch Farms and Strand.
- Khayelitsha/Mitchells Plain, which includes subdistricts: Blackheath, Blue Downs, Eerste River, Khayelitsha, Mitchell's Plain, and part of Guguletu
- Northern, which includes subdistricts: Brackenfell, Durbanville, Eversdal, Joostenbergvlakte, Kenridge, Kraaifontein, Malmesbury Farms, Vredekloof, and Welgemoed.
- Southern, which includes subdistricts: Bergvliet, Cape Point, Constantia, Fish Hoek, Hout Bay, Kalk Bay, Kommetjie, Newlands, Noordhoek, Ocean View, Plumstead, Simon's Town, Tokai, Wynberg, parts of Muizenberg, Retreat, Rondebosch, and Table Mountain.
- Table Bay, which includes subdistricts: Camps Bay, Cape Town, Observatory, Pinelands, Robben Island, Sea Point, Signal Hill/Lion's Head, and parts of Epping, Goodwood, Langa, Maitland, and Table Mountain,
- Tygerberg, which includes subdistricts: Airport, Bellville, Bishop Lavis, Delft, Elsies River, Kalsteenfontein, Kuils River, Parow, Plattekloof, and parts of Epping, Goodwood, and Milnerton.

=== Adjacent municipalities ===
- Swartland Local Municipality, West Coast District Municipality (north)
- Drakenstein Local Municipality, Cape Winelands District Municipality (northeast)
- Stellenbosch Local Municipality, Cape Winelands District Municipality (northeast)
- Theewaterskloof Local Municipality, Overberg District Municipality (east)
- Overstrand Local Municipality, Overberg District Municipality (southeast)

The City of Cape Town is also bounded by the Atlantic Ocean to the south and west.

== Alleged corruption ==
Two senior city managers were accused of corruption relating to a R186m urban waste management tender. In October 2024, the city announced it was investigating the allegations.

== See also ==
- Cape Town City Council – Administrative body of the City of Cape Town metro
- Biodiversity of Cape Town – Diversity of the natural environment of Cape Town
- Cape Town – Legislative capital of South Africa
- Metropolitan municipality (South Africa) – Second-level local government structure in South Africa
- List of Cape Town suburbs
