= Blue Downs =

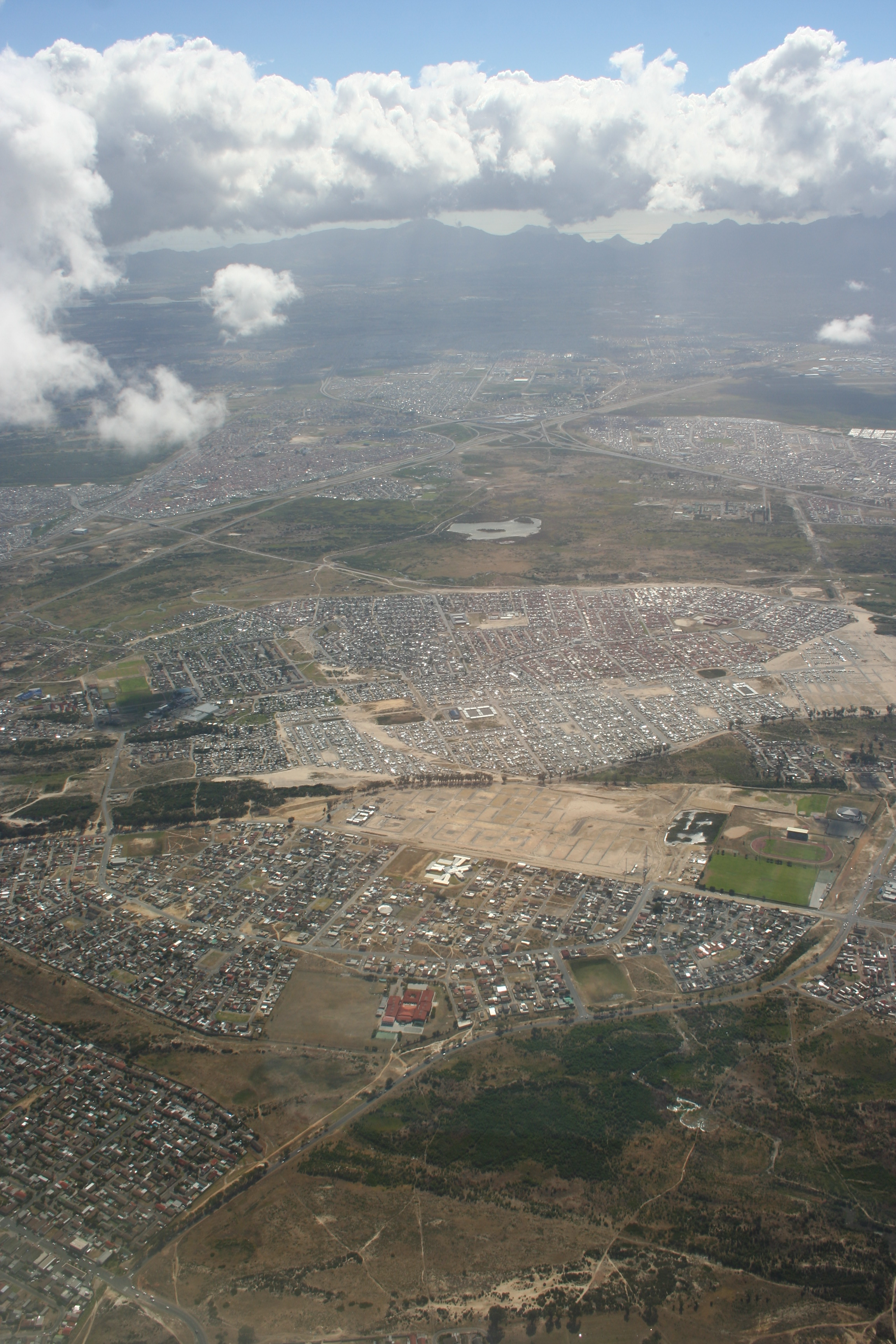
- An aerial photograph of Blue Downs in the foreground and Mfuleni laying just beyond. Picture is taken of these two areas stretching to the west towards Table Mountain. Ikweze Park (on the left) and Delft (to the right) lay beyond.

- Location within Western Cape Location within South Africa
- Coordinates: 34°0′0″S 18°41′51″E
- Country: South Africa
- Province: Western Cape
- Municipality: City of Cape Town

Government
  - Type: Metropolitan City Council
  - Councillor: Cynthia Claasen (Ward 19) (DA); Bert Van Dalen (Ward 14) (DA)

Area
  - Total: 24.57 km^{2} (9.49 sq mi)

Population (2011)
  - Total: 92,330
  - Density: 3,758/km^{2} (9,733/sq mi)

Racial makeup (2011)
  - Black African: 22.9%
  - Coloured: 74.9%
  - Indian/Asian: 0.5%
  - White: 0.3%
  - Other: 1.3%

First languages (2011)
  - Afrikaans: 63.6%
  - Xhosa: 17.0%
  - English: 15.8%
  - Other: 3.5%
- Time zone: UTC+2 (SAST)
- Postal code (street): 7100
- PO box: 7105
- Area code: 021

Blue Downs is a town in the Western Cape, South Africa. It forms part of the Eastern Suburbs Zone of the City of Cape Town situated on the eastern outskirts of the city and is also located on the Cape Flats, a flat expanse of land east of Cape Town. The suburb was founded in the late 20th century.

The suburb is one of the outlying areas of Cape Town that has been targeted by the Western Cape provincial government for development. Planned developments include improved public transportation for the area and the building of additional schools.

== See also ==
- Blackheath train accident
