= David Marks (disambiguation) =

David Marks (born 1948) is an American musician and songwriter, member of the Beach Boys.

David Marks may also refer to:

- David Marks (architect) (1952–2017), British architect
- David Marks (songwriter) (born 1944), South African-born songwriter, singer and producer
- David Marks (psychologist) (born 1945), British psychologist
- David J. Marks, woodworker who hosts a TV show on DIY Network
- David Woolf Marks (1811–1909), English Reform Jewish minister
- David Marks (preacher) (1805–1845), early evangelist in the Free Will Baptist Church
- David H. Marks, American engineer
- David Marks, main character in the film All Good Things

== See also ==
- David Mark (disambiguation)
- David Marx
