= Upstate New York =

Region of New York state

Coordinates: 43°N 76°W

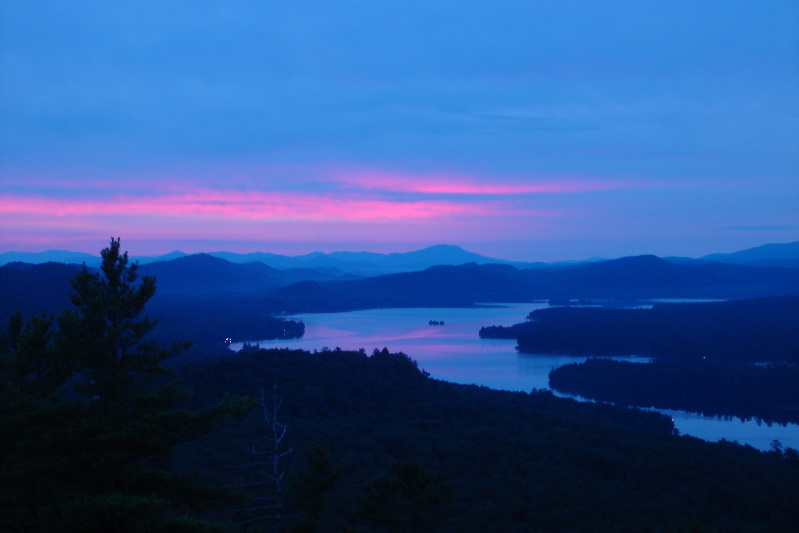
The Fulton Chain of Lakes, a chain of eight lakes in Adirondack Park

Upstate New York is a geographic region of New York State that lies north and northwest of the New York City metropolitan area of downstate New York. Upstate includes the lower, middle, and upper Hudson Valley, the Capital District, the Mohawk Valley region, Central New York, the Southern Tier, the Finger Lakes region, Western New York, and the North Country. Major cities across upstate New York from east to west include the state capital of Albany, Utica, Binghamton, Syracuse, Rochester, and Buffalo.

Before the European colonization of the Americas, the region of upstate New York was populated by several Native American tribes. It was home to the Haudenosaunee (Iroquois) Confederacy, an Indigenous confederation of six tribes, known as the Six Nations. Henry Hudson made the first recorded European exploration of the region in 1609, and the Dutch erected Fort Orange (present-day Albany) in 1624, which was the first permanent European settlement in New York. The region saw many battles during the American Revolutionary War, with the Haudenosaunee split between supporters of the loyalists and supporters of the revolutionaries. After the war ended, the 1784 Treaty of Fort Stanwix kicked off a series of treaties and purchases that saw the Haudenosaunee cede the vast majority of their land in upstate New York to the newly formed United States.

The 1825 opening of the Erie Canal across upstate New York transformed the economy of the region and the state. The canal greatly eased the movement of goods from across the upper Midwest and the cities along the Great Lakes through upstate New York and to the port of New York City. As a result, upstate New York became a hotbed for manufacturing during the Second Industrial Revolution, giving birth to such firms as General Electric, IBM, Kodak, and Xerox. The rapid industrialization led to a large influx of immigrants seeking jobs at factories across the region. Since the mid-20th century, American deindustrialization has contributed to economic and population decline, and the region is largely considered part of the Rust Belt.

There are a wide variety of land uses in the region, including urban, suburban, forested preserve, and rural landscapes. Due to its vast areas of rural land, upstate also supports a strong agricultural industry, and is notable for its dairy, maple syrup, and fruit production (especially apples), as well as winemaking. Upstate New York includes a number of notable waterways, with the Susquehanna, Delaware, and Hudson Rivers all originating in the region, and is bordered on its northern and western edges by the Saint Lawrence River and the Great Lakes. As a result, the region is a significant source of hydroelectric power (going back to the creation of the world's first hydroelectric dam by Nikola Tesla at Niagara Falls) and drinking water (with multiple reservoirs serving New York City). Upstate New York is home to numerous popular tourist and recreational destinations, including Niagara Falls, the Adirondack and Catskill Mountains, the Thousand Islands, the National Baseball Hall of Fame and International Boxing Hall of Fame, and the Finger Lakes.

== Definition ==
Upstate New York refers to some or all of the area north and west of New York City, which is highlighted in red.

There is no clear official boundary between upstate New York and downstate New York. The most expansive definition of the upstate New York region excludes only New York City and Long Island, which are always considered to be part of downstate New York; this usage is common among New York City residents and significantly less farther north. This definition is used by the Department of Environmental Conservation. A cheeky joke among Manhattanites is that anything north of 14th Street is "upstate".

Another usage locates the upstate/downstate boundary farther north, at the point where New York City's suburbs segue into its exurbs, as the exurbs do not generally fall within the Census Bureau-defined New York–Newark Urban Area. This latter boundary places most of the Lower Hudson Valley, or Westchester and Rockland counties and about one-third of Putnam County, downstate, while putting the northwestern edge of Rockland County as well as the northernmost quarter of Westchester County (including Peekskill) upstate. Conversely, area residents often use Interstate 84 to delineate a boundary between upstate and downstate New York.

Yet another usage follows the U.S. Census definition of the New York metropolitan area prior to 2010, which included all of Westchester, Rockland, and Putnam counties. This definition was used by the plaintiffs in the federal redistricting case Rodriguez v. Pataki.

In New York state law, the definition of the upstate boundary also varies. While Westchester is seemingly always considered downstate under state law, some definitions include Rockland and Putnam counties in the downstate region, and others also include Orange and Dutchess counties; all of these counties are served by Metro-North Railroad lines. Ulster County, and, in the largest state-defined extent of downstate, Columbia County, are also sometimes included. The division line between the United States District Court for the Southern District of New York and the United States District Court for the Northern District of New York places Sullivan County and Dutchess County in the Southern District, and Ulster and Columbia counties in the Northern District.

Residents of upstate New York typically prefer to identify with subregions, such as the Hudson Valley (Middle and Upper), the Capital District, the Mohawk Valley, the North Country, Western New York or Central New York.

Within New York, surveys have had difficulty determining a consensus. In a 2016 poll of New York voters in which respondents were asked to choose among four definitions of where upstate begins, three were about equally common, selected by between 25% and 30% of respondents each: north of New York City, north of Westchester County, and north of Poughkeepsie in Dutchess County. (The fourth, which also started north of Poughkeepsie but excluded Buffalo as a unique region neither upstate nor downstate, drew only 7%.) An informal 2018 poll found the Hudson Valley region is the most heavily disputed area regarding whether it is upstate or downstate.

A number of businesses and institutions in the area have "upstate" as part of their name. Examples of this include the State University of New York Upstate Medical University in Syracuse, the Upstate New York Chapter of the Arthritis Foundation serving 31 of New York's 62 counties, and the VA Healthcare Network Upstate New York, which includes all of New York State northward and westward from Kingston in Ulster County. Other organizations in New York with "upstate" in their name include the Upstate Collegiate Athletic Association (now known as the Liberty League), the Upstate Correctional Facility, the Upstate New York Club Hockey League, the Upstate New York Synod, and the Upstate Citizens for Equality.

== History ==
=== Early history ===
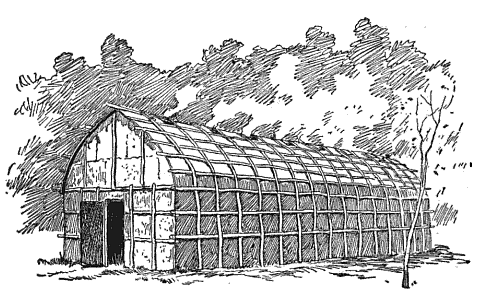
A traditional Haudenosaunee longhouse

Before the arrival of Europeans, the area was long inhabited by Iroquoian-speaking people, mainly west of the Hudson River and around the Great Lakes and Algonquian-speaking people, mainly east of the Hudson River. The conflict between the two peoples continued through the period of early European colonization, and the French, Dutch and English tended to ally with their trading partners among the indigenous peoples. The Haudenosaunee or Iroquois Confederacy of the Five (later Six) Nations was a powerful force in its home territory. The Mohawk referred to the present-day area as Kanienkeh ("the Land of the Flint"), the Mohawk name for their homeland.

The Five Nations' territory extended from the Mohawk River Valley through the western part of the state and into current Pennsylvania. From this home base, they also controlled at various times large swaths of additional territory throughout what is now the northeastern United States. The Guswhenta (Two Row Wampum Treaty), made with the Dutch government in 1613, codified relations between the Haudenosaunee and European colonizers, and formed the basis of subsequent treaties.

In the mid-17th century, during the Beaver Wars, the Haudenosaunee were victorious and dominated the neighboring Neutral, Wenro, and Erie nations in western New York. Survivors were mostly assimilated into the Seneca people of the Haudenosaunee; some are believed to have escaped to South Carolina, where they merged with other Indian tribes.

The region was important from the first days of both French and Dutch colonization in the seventeenth century. The New Netherland colony encompassed the Hudson Valley from Manhattan Island north to the confluence of the Hudson and Mohawk rivers, where Fort Orange (later Albany) was established in 1624. The fort at Schenectady was built in 1661. The upper Hudson Valley was the center of much of the colony's fur trade, which was highly lucrative, serving a demand for furs in Europe.

North and west of New Netherland, the French established trading posts along the St. Lawrence River and as far south as the shores of Onondaga Lake. They found both trading and proselytizing difficult among the Haudenosaunee, as Samuel de Champlain had alienated the Haudenosaunee during military forays from New France. In the 1640s, three French Jesuit missionaries to New France—St. René Goupil, St. Isaac Jogues, and St. Jean de Lalande—were killed near the Mohawk village of Ossernenon, which was located at the confluence of the Schoharie and Mohawk rivers, where the modern hamlet of Auriesville was later developed. They are considered to be the first three U.S. saints.

England seized New Netherland by force in 1664, renaming it New York. The Dutch recaptured the colony nine years later but ceded it to England under the Treaty of Westminster of 1674.

In the eighteenth century, the British consolidated their hold on the region. William Johnson, an Irish British Army officer and colonial administrator, established an estate in the Mohawk Valley, living among the Mohawk, learning their language, and forging an alliance with them. He was appointed as the British Indian agent to the Haudenosaunee. The British also encouraged settlement in the Mohawk Valley by other Europeans, including German Palatines beginning in the 1720s.

In what became known as the Albany Congress in 1754, delegates from seven of the thirteen British North American colonies met at Albany to pursue a treaty with the powerful Mohawk. Benjamin Franklin, a Pennsylvania delegate, proposed a plan for uniting the seven colonies that greatly exceeded the scope of the congress. The delegates spent most of their time debating this Albany Plan of union, one of the first attempts to form a union of the colonies "under one government as far as might be necessary for defense and other general important purposes". The delegates approved an amended version, but the colonies rejected it.

To counter the French militarily, the British established forts along Lake Ontario and at portages between the Mohawk Valley and the adjacent Lake Champlain and Lake Ontario watersheds. The region became the area for many conflicts of the French and Indian War, such as the Battle of Fort Oswego (1756) and the Siege of Fort William Henry (which was later depicted in the work of James Fenimore Cooper), during the Seven Years' War.

The British conquered New France by 1760 with the fall of Quebec. France formally ceded New France to the British in the Treaty of Paris of 1763. The same year, King George III issued the Royal Proclamation of 1763, which established the western and northern boundary of the Province of New York at the limits of the Hudson, Mohawk and Delaware River watersheds. The area between that boundary and the Great Lakes and Saint Lawrence River, including west of the Appalachian Mountains, was to be the "Indian Reserve."

=== American Revolution ===
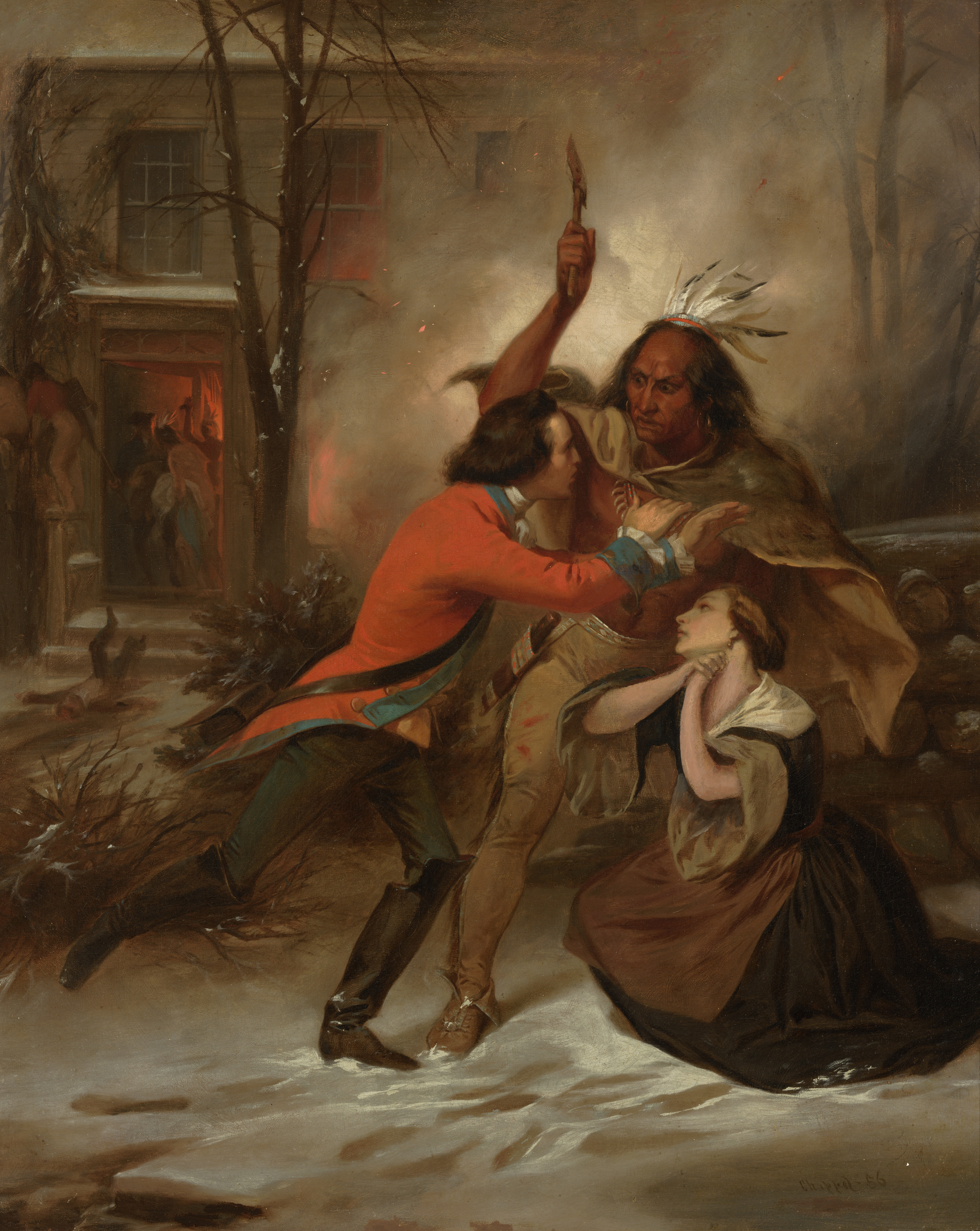
The Cherry Valley massacre

Between 1774 and 1783, deeply divided colonists waged civil war on each other directly and by proxy, through attacks such as the Seneca-led Cherry Valley and the Mohawk-led Cobleskill massacre. In 1779, the Sullivan Expedition, a campaign by the Continental Army ordered by General George Washington, drove thousands of the Haudenosaunee from their villages, farms and lands in the region in an effort to both avenge and prevent such attacks.

The region was strategically important to the war plans of both the British and the Continental forces. British efforts to divide the New England colonies from the rest led to battles including the Battle of Valcour Island and the Battle of Saratoga, a significant turning point in the war. While New York City remained in the hands of the British during most of the war, the upstate region was eventually dominated by the Colonial forces. At the end of the war, the Continental Army was headquartered in Newburgh. Uncertain that the Continental Congress would pay back wages, some Continental officers threatened an uprising in what became known as the Newburgh Conspiracy.

=== Post-revolutionary period ===
After the American Revolution, the Treaty of Paris established the border between New York and British North America. The 45th Parallel became the border with Quebec or Lower Canada. The St. Lawrence River, Lake Ontario, the Niagara River and Lake Erie became the border with Upper Canada. Great Britain continued to occupy military installations along the American shores of the Great Lakes until 1794, including Fort Niagara at the mouth of the Niagara River and Fort Ontario at the mouth of the Oswego River.

The government of the new State of New York seized the property of New Yorkers who had remained loyal to the British crown. Thousands emigrated to colonies that remained under British rule, such as Nova Scotia and the newly established Upper Canada (now Ontario). Haudenosaunee who had fought with the British also fled. The British Crown granted a large tract of land in Upper Canada to their Haudenosaunee allies, who established the Grand River settlement.

In the federal Treaty of Canandaigua, the new United States recognized the title of the remaining Haudenosaunee to the land north and west of the Proclamation Line of 1763. Nevertheless, New York state officials and private land agents sought through the early 19th century to extinguish Indian title to these lands via non-Federally-sanctioned treaties, such as the Treaty of Big Tree. The Treaties of Buffalo Creek were designed to finally remove the last of the native claims in Western New York as part of the federal Indian Removal program, but the purchaser failed to buy most of the land in time, and some of the tribes objected to their exclusion. Three of the four reservations remain in the region to this day; one of the reservations leased out their land to form the city of Salamanca, and the coexistence of the predominantly white city and the reservation has been a source of contention since the 1990s.

Both before and after the Revolution, boundary disputes with other colonies and their successor states also complicated American settlement. In conflict with the New York Colony's claims west of the Hudson Valley, which placed the entire region in the sprawling Albany County, the Province of Pennsylvania claimed much of the Southern Tier until 1774, while the Massachusetts Bay Colony claimed all of the region west of Massachusetts to the Great Lakes.

The Province of New York also claimed jurisdiction east to the Connecticut River. To pursue this claim north of Connecticut and Massachusetts, New York granted lands to settlers in what is now Vermont at the same time that New Hampshire made grants of the same lands. When Vermont declared independence in 1777, the new Republic of Vermont recognized the New Hampshire grants over those of New York. New Yorkers who lost land in Vermont came to be known as the "Vermont Sufferers" and were granted new lands in 1788 in the town of Bainbridge, New York.

The dispute with Massachusetts over lands to the west of Massachusetts was settled in the 1786 Treaty of Hartford by dividing the rights to the land. The treaty granted sovereignty to the State of New York, but granted to the Commonwealth of Massachusetts the "pre-emptive" right to seek title to the land from the Haudenosaunee. The eastern boundary of the Massachusetts lands was thus known as the Preemption Line. This line runs from the Pennsylvania line due north to Lake Ontario, passing through Seneca Lake. The line was surveyed a second time due to initial errors. The Commonwealth of Massachusetts sold this land in large tracts, including the Phelps and Gorham Purchase and the Holland Purchase.

Many of the settlers of what then became Central and Western New York came from the New England states. The Central New York Military Tract, where many of the townships were given the names of classical military and literary figures by Robert Harpur, was established to grant land to Revolutionary War veterans. Some of Northern New York was founded by the hundreds of Canadian exiles who had fought in the First and Second Canadian Regiments of the Continental Army, who were banished from Canada due to their rebellion against the Crown.

=== 19th century ===
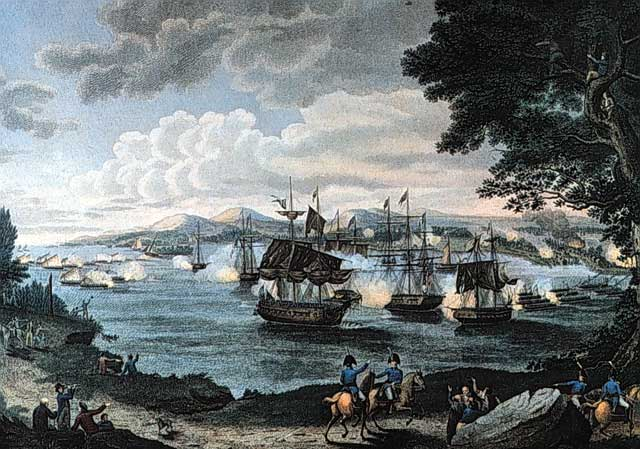
The Battle of Plattsburgh in the War of 1812 depicted in an 1816 engraving

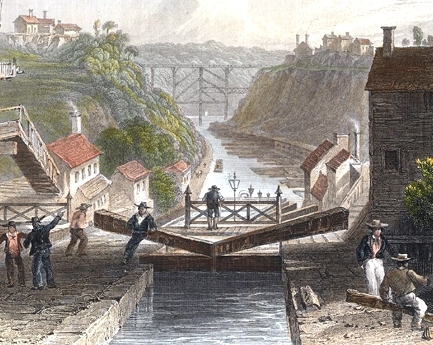
Erie Canal at Lockport, New York, in 1839

Battles of the War of 1812 (1812–1815) were fought on the Niagara Frontier; in the Champlain Valley, including the Battle of Plattsburgh; in the St. Lawrence Valley; and on Lake Ontario, including the Battle of Sackett's Harbor. British forces also burnt Buffalo in retaliation for the American destruction of Newark in Canada. After the war, the US government began to construct Fort Montgomery just south of the border at Rouses Point on Lake Champlain. Subsequently, it was discovered that at that point, the actual 45th parallel was three-quarters of a mile south of the surveyed line, putting the fort, which became known as "Fort Blunder", in Canada. This was not resolved until 1842 with the Webster–Ashburton Treaty, in which Great Britain and the United States decided to leave the border on the meandering line as surveyed.

Slavery existed in New Netherland and the Province of New York. New York was in the 1690s the largest importer of slaves among the American colonies. Slavery did not end with the American Revolution, although John Jay introduced an emancipation bill into the State Assembly as early as 1777. Sojourner Truth was held as a slave in the Hudson Valley from the time she was born in 1797 until she escaped in 1826. Through efforts of the New York Manumission Society and others, New York began to adopt a policy of gradual emancipation in 1799. The law passed in 1817 that would finally emancipate slaves did not take effect for ten years, giving slaveowners an entire decade to sell their slaves away to other states. When the law finally took effect, the last 2,800 slaves in New York State were emancipated on July 4, 1827.

Although routes for travel on foot and by canoe had existed across the region for hundreds of years, transportation of agricultural goods to market was expensive and slow. Influenced by the canals being built in Britain, leading citizens of New York began to press for the construction of a canal across the state. Governor DeWitt Clinton prevailed upon the legislature to charter and fund construction of a canal from Albany to Buffalo. Construction of the Erie Canal began in 1817 and was completed in 1825. The canal allowed the area to become an important component of the 19th century industrial expansion in the United States. The canal also promoted trade with British North America and settlement of newer states in western territories. Later in the century the New York Central Railroad followed the "water-level route" from New York City to the Great Lakes, contributing to the industrialization of cities along its route.

Several times in the nineteenth century, upstate New York served as a staging area and refuge for Canadian rebels against Great Britain, as well as Irish-American invaders of Canada, straining British–American relations. In 1837 and 1838, in the aftermath of the Lower Canada Rebellion, some Québécois rebels escaped south to the North Country, while on the Niagara Frontier, events of the Upper Canada Rebellion, also known as the Patriot War, took place. In the late 1860s, some of the Fenian raids were launched across the Niagara Frontier; Fenians also assembled in Malone.

Although now largely discredited, the report of the 1905–1907 Mills Commission, charged with investigating the origins of baseball, named Cooperstown as the place where baseball was invented in the 1830s or 1840s by Abner Doubleday. Cooperstown is the home of the National Baseball Hall of Fame and Museum. (Modern research suggests that the game was actually developed in its modern form in New York City.)

In the pre–Civil War era, upstate New York became a major center of radical abolitionist activity and was an important nexus of the Underground Railroad. Resistance to the Fugitive Slave Act was particularly heated in the region, as evidenced by such events as the Jerry Rescue. The American women's rights movement was also born in upstate New York at this time. The Seneca Falls Convention, the first women's rights convention, was held at Seneca Falls in 1848. The Rochester Convention, the second such convention, was held two weeks later in Rochester.

Through the nineteenth century, upstate New York was a hotbed of religious revivalism. A number of sects, such as the Shakers and the Oneida Community, established themselves in upstate New York during that time. This led evangelist Charles Grandison Finney to coin the term the "Burned-Over District" for the region. Because of the comparative isolation of the region, many of the sects were Nonconformist, and because of their non-traditional tenets they had numerous difficulties with government and other local people. The region is considered to be the cradle of Mormonism. The Mormons, Seventh-day Adventists and Spiritualists are the only 21st-century survivors of the hundreds of sects created during this time; some more mainstream churches, such as the Wesleyan Church and Free Methodist Church (both offshoots of Methodism that originated in political disputes with the mainline Methodist church), also survive.

In the 19th century, extractive industries changed the landscape. Potash was manufactured as the land was cleared for farming. Logging was rampant in the Adirondacks. Iron was mined in the Adirondacks and the North Country. By the 1870s, business leaders, concerned about the effect of deforestation on the water supply necessary to the Erie Canal, advocated for the creation of forest preserves in the Adirondacks and the Catskills. The Adirondack Park and Catskill Park were created and strengthened by a series of legislation between 1885 and 1894, when the "forever wild" provision of the New York State Constitution was added.

=== 20th century ===
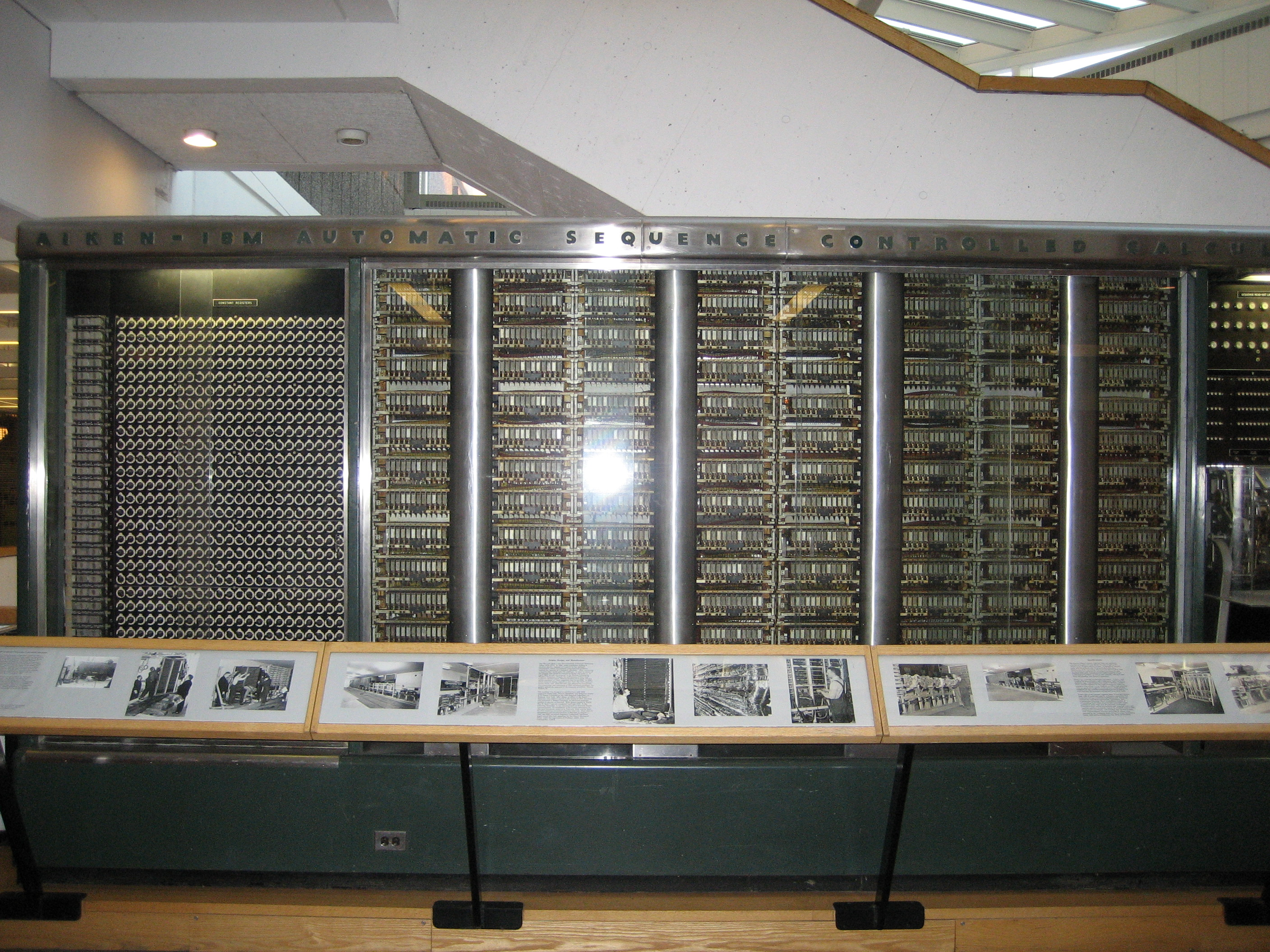
Harvard Mark I, one of the earliest computers, made by IBM in Endicott, New York

During the era immediately following World War II, upstate reached what was probably its peak influence in the national economy. Major local corporations such as IBM, General Electric, Kodak, Xerox and Carrier had national success, producing cutting-edge products for business, government and consumers, and leadership in corporate culture. The opening of the New York State Thruway in the mid-1950s gave the region superior access to other eastern markets. This regional advantage faded as many local firms relocated certain operations to other states, or downsized in the face of foreign competition, similar to events in other areas in the American Rust Belt. There have, however, been recent efforts at economic revitalization. In April 2021, GlobalFoundries, a company specializing in the semiconductor industry, moved its headquarters from Silicon Valley, California to its semiconductor chip manufacturing facility in Malta, New York.

Since the late 20th century, with the decline of manufacturing and its jobs, the area has generally suffered a net population loss, most heavily in Western New York. As paraphrased by Kent Ryden, the upstate area was depicted by writer Russell Banks in his famous novel The Sweet Hereafter (1991) as "cold, snowy, bleak, and in the middle of nowhere". The novel was set in an "ugly and economically moribund" town, inhabited by "uneducated" and "poor" people "living dead-end lives".

From 2014 to 2018, as part of an attempt to boost tourism in the economically depressed region, New York placed over 500 "I Love New York" tourism destination signs along its highways and expressways in violation of the federal Manual on Uniform Traffic Control Devices. The state government backed down in November 2018 only after the federal government threatened to withhold over $14 million in federal funding.

By contrast, many Amish and Mennonite families are recent arrivals to the area and have helped revive agriculture as part of the economy. Beginning in 1974, many Mennonite families moved to the Penn Yan area of Yates County from Lancaster County, Pennsylvania, seeking cheaper farmland. Amish communities have also been established in St. Lawrence, Montgomery, Chautauqua and Cattaraugus counties, and are making farming profitable.

Artisans are reviving traditional specialty cheeses and developing growing markets for their products, including shipping some items to the New York metropolitan market. A Greek-style yogurt, Chobani, is being produced upstate by a recent immigrant, who has expanded his operation nationally.

Additionally, upstate New York continues to boast low crime rates, high educational prospects, and readily affordable daily essentials, earning Syracuse, Rochester, Albany, Schenectady, and Buffalo spots in the Forbes magazine list of top ten places to raise a family in the United States.

Five of the six Haudenosaunee nations have filed land claims against New York State (or have sought settlement of pending claims), based on late 18th-century treaties following the American Revolutionary War with the State of New York (which did not have constitutional authority to treat with American Indian nations) and the United States.

== Geography ==
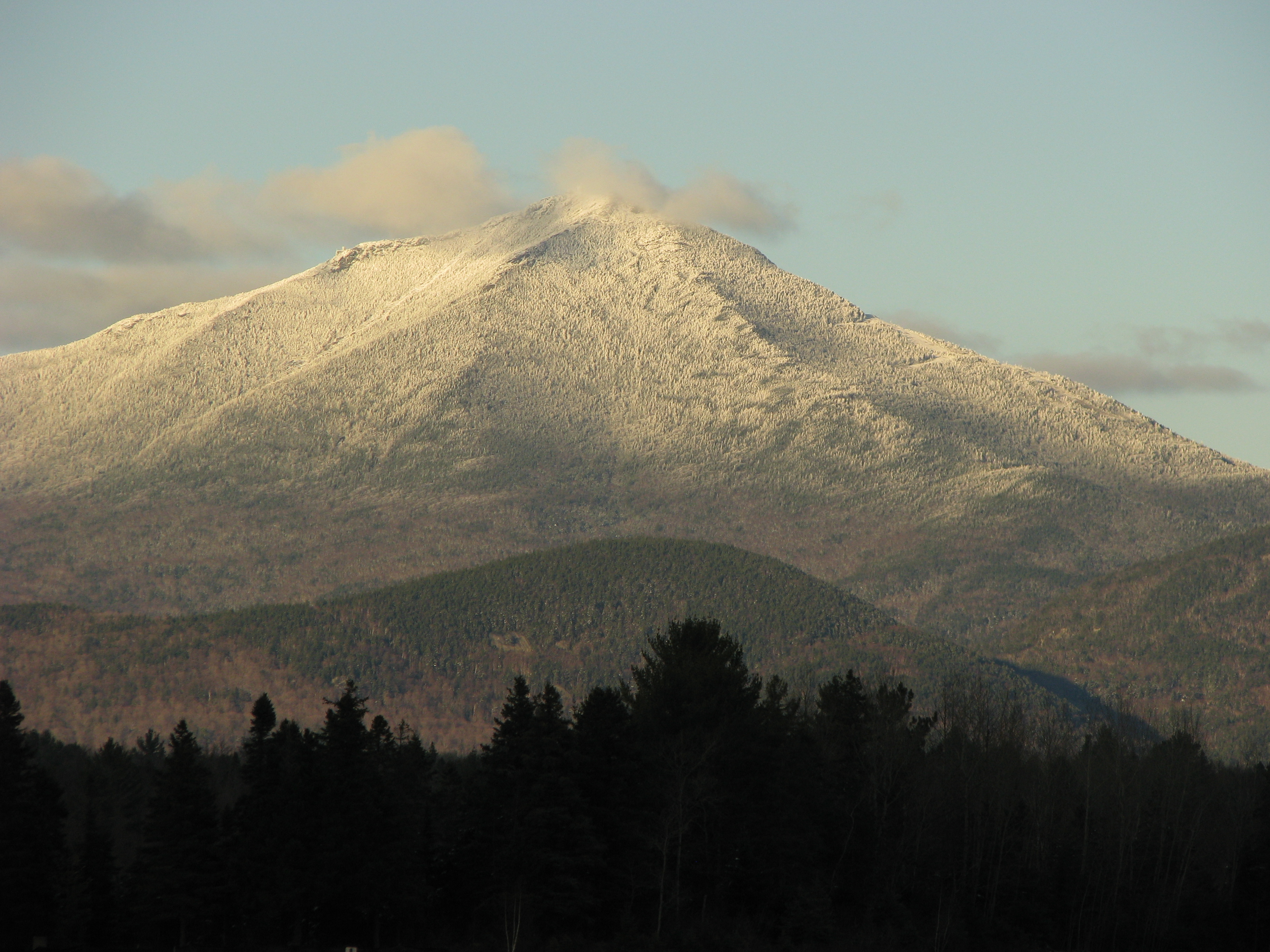
Whiteface Mountain in the Adirondacks

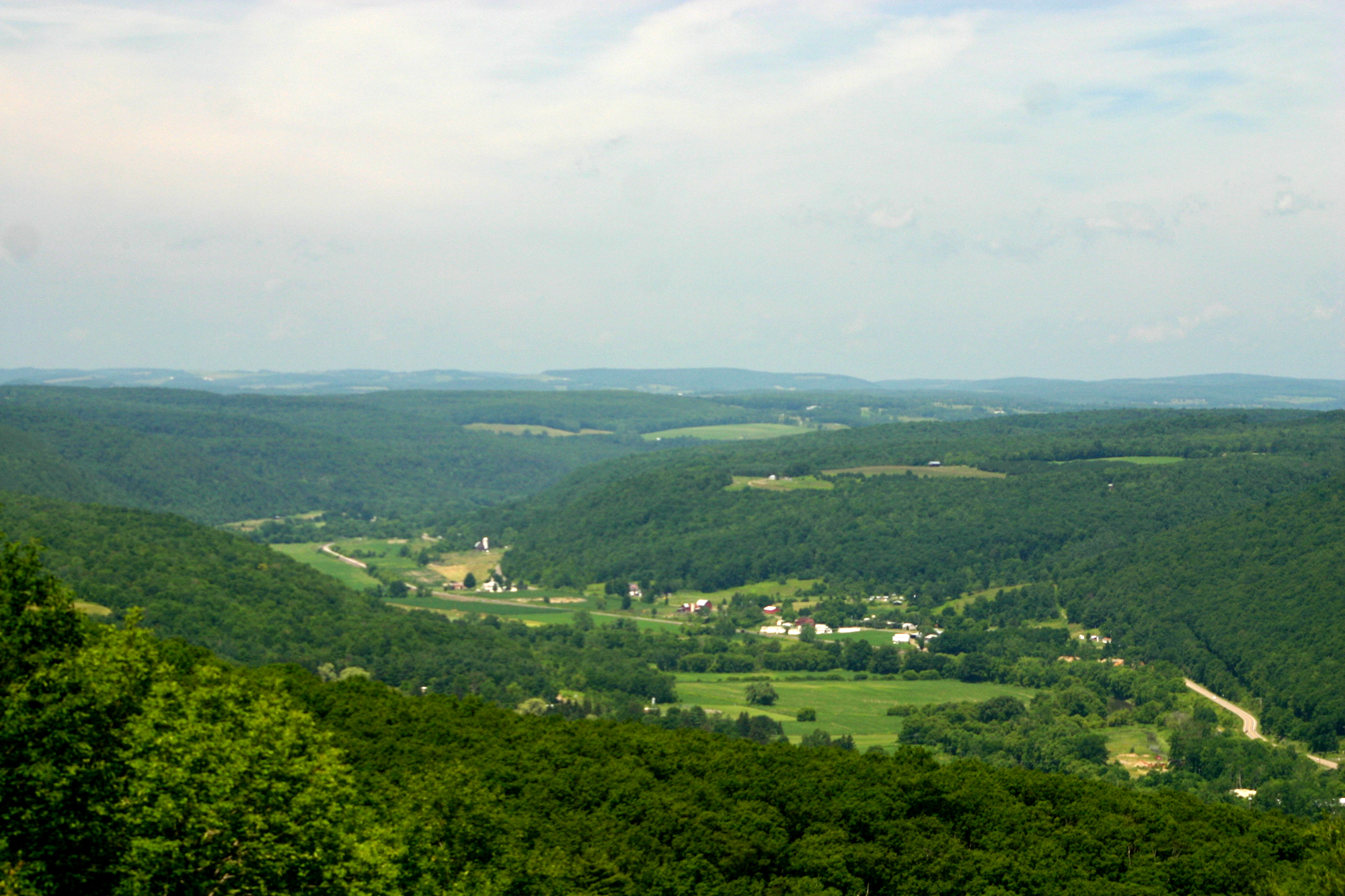
Canisteo River Valley in the Allegheny Plateau

The headwaters of the Delaware, Susquehanna, Mohawk, Hudson, and Allegheny rivers are located in the region. Several regions upstate are characterized by major mountain ranges, large lakes, and extensive forests.

The Allegheny Plateau extends into west and central New York from the south. The Catskill Mountains lie within Lower New York in the southeastern part of the state, closer to New York City. The Catskills and the Allegheny Plateau are part of the Appalachian chain. By contrast, Northern New York contains the Adirondack Mountains, which are sometimes mistaken as part of the Appalachians but are in fact a southern extension of the Canadian Shield.

In the more mountainous eastern parts of upstate New York, along the valleys of the Hudson River and the Mohawk River, have been historically important travel corridors and remain so today. Western New York in the vicinity of Buffalo is very flat, as it was once the bottom of a glacial lake. The only "hills" in Niagara County are the Niagara Escarpment, which formed the Falls.

Upstate New York has a long shared border with the Canadian province of Ontario stretching from Western New York across Northern New York. It is primarily divided by water boundaries along Lake Erie, the Niagara River, Lake Ontario and the St. Lawrence River. At the conflux of New York, Québec and Ontario lies the Mohawk Nation at Akwesasne. To the east, across the remainder of the North Country region, New York shares a land border with the province of Québec.

Upstate counties and towns are generally larger in area and smaller in population, compared with those downstate, although there are exceptions. The state's smallest county in population (Hamilton County) and largest county in area (St. Lawrence County on the state's northern border) are both in upstate New York, within the North Country and Thousand Islands regions of northern New York. The counties with the largest in population (Kings County) and smallest in area (New York County) are both parts of New York City.

=== Climate ===
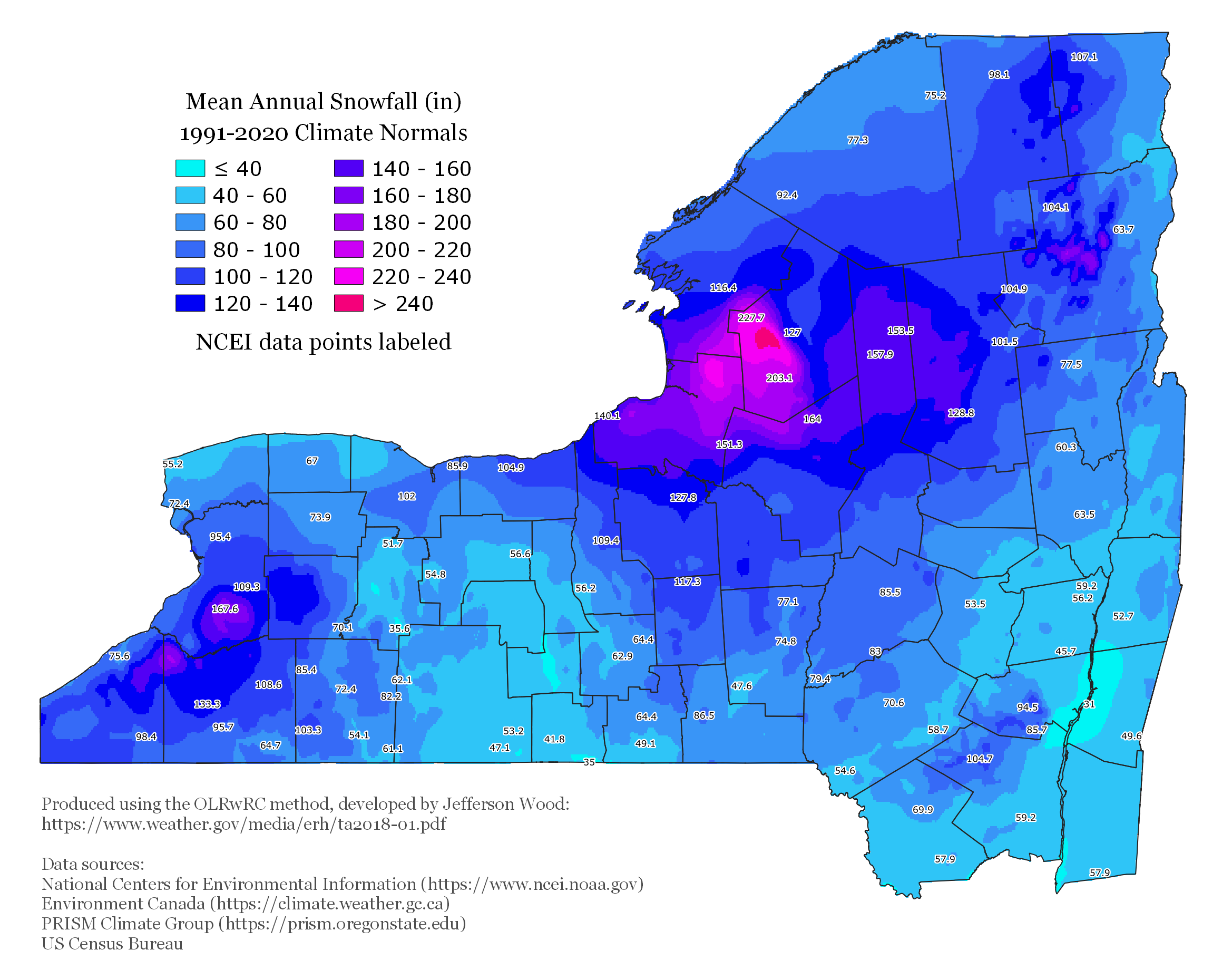
Mean annual snowfall in inches for Upstate New York, using 1991–2020 climate normals. Snowfall is especially prevalent in the snowbelts of western and north central New York.

Upstate New York is well known for its cold and snowy winters, particularly in comparison to the more temperate climate of downstate New York. The snowy reputation is especially true for the cities of Buffalo, Rochester, Oswego and Syracuse, and is largely due to lake-effect snow from Lake Ontario and Lake Erie. The villages of Old Forge and Saranac Lake, both in the Adirondacks, often vie on winter nights with places like International Falls, Minnesota, and Fargo, North Dakota, for the coldest spot in the nation.

Many of the features of upstate New York landscapes, such as the Finger Lakes and the drumlins that dot the region, are the result of glaciers during the Ice Age.

==== Statistics for selected cities ====
Climate data for Albany International Airport, New York (1991–2020 normals, (Note: Mean monthly maxima and minima (i.e. the expected highest and lowest temperature readings at any point during the year or given month) calculated based on data at said location from 1991 to 2020.) extremes 1874–present (Note: Official records for Albany kept January 1874 to May 1938 at downtown and at Albany Int'l since June 1938. For more information, see Threadex))
Month	Jan	Feb	Mar	Apr	May	Jun	Jul	Aug	Sep	Oct	Nov	Dec	Year
Record high °F (°C)	71 (22)	74 (23)	89 (32)	93 (34)	97 (36)	100 (38)	104 (40)	102 (39)	100 (38)	91 (33)	82 (28)	72 (22)	104 (40)
Mean maximum °F (°C)	54.5 (12.5)	54.5 (12.5)	65.9 (18.8)	80.9 (27.2)	87.8 (31.0)	92.0 (33.3)	92.7 (33.7)	90.6 (32.6)	87.0 (30.6)	77.8 (25.4)	67.7 (19.8)	56.4 (13.6)	94.5 (34.7)
Mean daily maximum °F (°C)	32.8 (0.4)	36.0 (2.2)	45.3 (7.4)	59.2 (15.1)	71.2 (21.8)	79.4 (26.3)	83.9 (28.8)	82.0 (27.8)	74.4 (23.6)	61.6 (16.4)	49.3 (9.6)	38.2 (3.4)	59.4 (15.2)
Daily mean °F (°C)	24.4 (−4.2)	26.8 (−2.9)	35.7 (2.1)	48.1 (8.9)	59.6 (15.3)	68.4 (20.2)	73.1 (22.8)	71.4 (21.9)	63.5 (17.5)	51.4 (10.8)	40.5 (4.7)	30.4 (−0.9)	49.4 (9.7)
Mean daily minimum °F (°C)	15.9 (−8.9)	17.6 (−8.0)	26.1 (−3.3)	36.9 (2.7)	48.1 (8.9)	57.4 (14.1)	62.4 (16.9)	60.7 (15.9)	52.6 (11.4)	41.1 (5.1)	31.6 (−0.2)	22.7 (−5.2)	39.4 (4.1)
Mean minimum °F (°C)	−6.0 (−21.1)	−2.4 (−19.1)	7.8 (−13.4)	23.7 (−4.6)	33.8 (1.0)	43.3 (6.3)	51.5 (10.8)	48.9 (9.4)	37.6 (3.1)	27.0 (−2.8)	16.0 (−8.9)	4.6 (−15.2)	−8.4 (−22.4)
Record low °F (°C)	−28 (−33)	−22 (−30)	−21 (−29)	9 (−13)	26 (−3)	35 (2)	40 (4)	34 (1)	24 (−4)	16 (−9)	−11 (−24)	−22 (−30)	−28 (−33)
Average precipitation inches (mm)	2.60 (66)	2.28 (58)	3.09 (78)	3.11 (79)	3.41 (87)	4.05 (103)	4.55 (116)	3.76 (96)	3.73 (95)	3.85 (98)	2.99 (76)	3.26 (83)	40.68 (1,033)
Average snowfall inches (cm)	15.6 (40)	13.7 (35)	12.0 (30)	1.6 (4.1)	0.1 (0.25)	0.0 (0.0)	0.0 (0.0)	0.0 (0.0)	0.0 (0.0)	0.3 (0.76)	2.6 (6.6)	13.3 (34)	59.2 (150)
Average extreme snow depth inches (cm)	8.3 (21)	8.3 (21)	8.0 (20)	1.1 (2.8)	0.0 (0.0)	0.0 (0.0)	0.0 (0.0)	0.0 (0.0)	0.0 (0.0)	0.2 (0.51)	1.3 (3.3)	7.0 (18)	13.6 (35)
Average precipitation days (≥ 0.01 in)	12.7	10.6	11.8	12.2	12.7	12.2	11.4	11.0	9.7	11.2	11.1	12.6	139.2
Average snowy days (≥ 0.1 in)	10.1	7.8	5.7	1.3	0.0	0.0	0.0	0.0	0.0	0.2	2.4	7.0	34.5
Average relative humidity (%)	71.1	68.5	64.8	61.2	65.5	69.5	70.5	74.1	75.7	72.4	73.1	73.9	70.0
Average dew point °F (°C)	12.9 (−10.6)	14.5 (−9.7)	22.6 (−5.2)	32.2 (0.1)	45.0 (7.2)	55.0 (12.8)	60.3 (15.7)	59.4 (15.2)	52.3 (11.3)	40.3 (4.6)	31.1 (−0.5)	19.4 (−7.0)	37.1 (2.8)
Mean monthly sunshine hours	141.1	158.5	200.3	218.9	248.9	262.2	289.2	253.2	210.5	168.8	108.3	100.7	2,360.6
Percentage possible sunshine	48	54	54	54	55	57	62	59	56	49	38	34	53
Average ultraviolet index	1	2	4	5	7	8	8	7	6	3	2	1	5
Source 1: NOAA (relative humidity, dew point, and sun 1961–1990)
Source 2: Weather Atlas

Climate data for Binghamton, New York (Greater Binghamton Airport; elevation 1636 feet), 1991–2020 normals, (Note: Mean monthly maxima and minima (i.e. the expected highest and lowest temperature readings at any point during the year or given month) calculated based on data at said location from 1991 to 2020.) extremes 1951–present (Note: Official records for Binghamton were kept exclusively at the airport since 25 May 1951.)
Month	Jan	Feb	Mar	Apr	May	Jun	Jul	Aug	Sep	Oct	Nov	Dec	Year
Record high °F (°C)	63 (17)	70 (21)	82 (28)	89 (32)	89 (32)	94 (34)	98 (37)	95 (35)	96 (36)	85 (29)	77 (25)	65 (18)	98 (37)
Mean maximum °F (°C)	53.2 (11.8)	52.2 (11.2)	62.9 (17.2)	76.7 (24.8)	83.8 (28.8)	86.7 (30.4)	88.6 (31.4)	86.9 (30.5)	83.9 (28.8)	75.0 (23.9)	65.1 (18.4)	54.6 (12.6)	90.4 (32.4)
Mean daily maximum °F (°C)	29.5 (−1.4)	32.2 (0.1)	40.7 (4.8)	54.2 (12.3)	66.2 (19.0)	74.0 (23.3)	78.4 (25.8)	76.7 (24.8)	69.5 (20.8)	57.1 (13.9)	45.1 (7.3)	34.3 (1.3)	54.8 (12.7)
Daily mean °F (°C)	22.5 (−5.3)	24.5 (−4.2)	32.3 (0.2)	44.6 (7.0)	56.2 (13.4)	64.4 (18.0)	68.9 (20.5)	67.3 (19.6)	60.0 (15.6)	48.8 (9.3)	37.9 (3.3)	28.1 (−2.2)	46.3 (7.9)
Mean daily minimum °F (°C)	15.5 (−9.2)	16.9 (−8.4)	24.0 (−4.4)	35.0 (1.7)	46.1 (7.8)	54.9 (12.7)	59.4 (15.2)	58.0 (14.4)	50.6 (10.3)	40.5 (4.7)	30.7 (−0.7)	21.9 (−5.6)	37.8 (3.2)
Mean minimum °F (°C)	−3.6 (−19.8)	−0.7 (−18.2)	6.7 (−14.1)	21.9 (−5.6)	33.2 (0.7)	42.3 (5.7)	50.5 (10.3)	47.9 (8.8)	36.1 (2.3)	28.2 (−2.1)	16.2 (−8.8)	4.7 (−15.2)	−6 (−21)
Record low °F (°C)	−20 (−29)	−18 (−28)	−7 (−22)	9 (−13)	24 (−4)	33 (1)	39 (4)	37 (3)	25 (−4)	17 (−8)	0 (−18)	−18 (−28)	−20 (−29)
Average precipitation inches (mm)	2.62 (67)	2.41 (61)	3.05 (77)	3.63 (92)	3.78 (96)	4.69 (119)	3.80 (97)	4.10 (104)	4.01 (102)	3.76 (96)	3.11 (79)	3.08 (78)	42.04 (1,068)
Average snowfall inches (cm)	20.6 (52)	19.7 (50)	16.4 (42)	3.8 (9.7)	0.1 (0.25)	0.0 (0.0)	0.0 (0.0)	0.0 (0.0)	0.0 (0.0)	1.0 (2.5)	6.8 (17)	18.1 (46)	86.5 (220)
Average extreme snow depth inches (cm)	9.5 (24)	10.4 (26)	9.8 (25)	2.0 (5.1)	0.1 (0.25)	0.0 (0.0)	0.0 (0.0)	0.0 (0.0)	0.0 (0.0)	0.4 (1.0)	3.4 (8.6)	7.6 (19)	16.2 (41)
Average precipitation days (≥ 0.01 in)	16.2	13.9	14.8	14.1	14.2	12.4	12.6	11.1	11.3	13.3	13.9	16.3	164.1
Average snowy days (≥ 0.1 in)	16.5	14.0	10.5	3.6	0.2	0.0	0.0	0.0	0.0	0.9	5.9	12.9	64.5
Average relative humidity (%)	74.0	72.4	69.3	64.9	67.0	72.0	72.0	75.4	78.1	73.8	76.4	78.4	72.8
Average dew point °F (°C)	13.8 (−10.1)	14.7 (−9.6)	22.6 (−5.2)	31.5 (−0.3)	43.5 (6.4)	54.0 (12.2)	58.5 (14.7)	57.9 (14.4)	51.8 (11.0)	39.9 (4.4)	30.7 (−0.7)	20.3 (−6.5)	36.6 (2.6)
Mean monthly sunshine hours	113.0	125.9	172.5	205.1	252.4	274.6	295.3	256.8	202.0	162.5	92.9	79.7	2,232.7
Percentage possible sunshine	38	43	47	51	56	60	64	60	54	47	32	28	50
Source: NOAA (relative humidity, dew point, and sun 1961–1990)

Climate data for Buffalo (Buffalo Niagara International Airport), 1991–2020 normals, (Note: Mean monthly maxima and minima (i.e. the expected highest and lowest temperature readings at any point during the year or given month) calculated based on data at said location from 1991 to 2020.) extremes 1871–present (Note: Official records for Buffalo kept January 1871 to June 1943 at downtown and at Buffalo Niagara Int'l since July 1943. For more information, see Threadex)
Month	Jan	Feb	Mar	Apr	May	Jun	Jul	Aug	Sep	Oct	Nov	Dec	Year
Record high °F (°C)	72 (22)	71 (22)	82 (28)	94 (34)	94 (34)	97 (36)	98 (37)	99 (37)	98 (37)	92 (33)	80 (27)	74 (23)	99 (37)
Mean maximum °F (°C)	56.4 (13.6)	54.5 (12.5)	66.0 (18.9)	77.9 (25.5)	84.3 (29.1)	88.1 (31.2)	89.5 (31.9)	88.5 (31.4)	86.4 (30.2)	77.9 (25.5)	67.4 (19.7)	56.8 (13.8)	91.5 (33.1)
Mean daily maximum °F (°C)	32.1 (0.1)	33.3 (0.7)	41.8 (5.4)	54.7 (12.6)	67.4 (19.7)	75.6 (24.2)	80.2 (26.8)	79.0 (26.1)	72.3 (22.4)	59.6 (15.3)	47.8 (8.8)	37.2 (2.9)	56.8 (13.8)
Daily mean °F (°C)	25.5 (−3.6)	26.4 (−3.1)	34.1 (1.2)	45.6 (7.6)	57.9 (14.4)	66.9 (19.4)	71.7 (22.1)	70.4 (21.3)	63.4 (17.4)	51.7 (10.9)	41.0 (5.0)	31.4 (−0.3)	48.8 (9.3)
Mean daily minimum °F (°C)	19.0 (−7.2)	19.5 (−6.9)	26.4 (−3.1)	36.5 (2.5)	48.3 (9.1)	58.1 (14.5)	63.1 (17.3)	61.7 (16.5)	54.5 (12.5)	43.9 (6.6)	34.2 (1.2)	25.6 (−3.6)	40.9 (4.9)
Mean minimum °F (°C)	0.8 (−17.3)	1.7 (−16.8)	9.3 (−12.6)	24.6 (−4.1)	35.6 (2.0)	45.6 (7.6)	52.8 (11.6)	51.0 (10.6)	41.0 (5.0)	30.7 (−0.7)	20.4 (−6.4)	8.5 (−13.1)	−2.8 (−19.3)
Record low °F (°C)	−16 (−27)	−20 (−29)	−7 (−22)	5 (−15)	25 (−4)	35 (2)	43 (6)	38 (3)	32 (0)	20 (−7)	2 (−17)	−10 (−23)	−20 (−29)
Average precipitation inches (mm)	3.35 (85)	2.49 (63)	2.89 (73)	3.37 (86)	3.37 (86)	3.37 (86)	3.23 (82)	3.23 (82)	4.10 (104)	4.03 (102)	3.50 (89)	3.75 (95)	40.68 (1,033)
Average snowfall inches (cm)	26.7 (68)	18.1 (46)	14.1 (36)	2.5 (6.4)	0.0 (0.0)	0.0 (0.0)	0.0 (0.0)	0.0 (0.0)	0.0 (0.0)	0.9 (2.3)	7.8 (20)	25.3 (64)	95.4 (242)
Average extreme snow depth inches (cm)	10.8 (27)	8.4 (21)	7.6 (19)	1.0 (2.5)	0.0 (0.0)	0.0 (0.0)	0.0 (0.0)	0.0 (0.0)	0.0 (0.0)	0.1 (0.25)	3.7 (9.4)	9.0 (23)	15.5 (39)
Average precipitation days (≥ 0.01 in)	19.2	15.8	14.8	13.4	12.8	11.9	10.8	10.0	10.9	14.1	14.4	17.7	165.8
Average snowy days (≥ 0.1 in)	16.4	13.5	9.1	3.2	0.0	0.0	0.0	0.0	0.0	0.4	4.7	12.2	59.5
Average relative humidity (%)	76.0	75.9	73.3	67.8	67.2	68.6	68.1	72.1	74.0	72.9	75.8	77.6	72.4
Average dew point °F (°C)	16.9 (−8.4)	17.6 (−8.0)	25.2 (−3.8)	33.4 (0.8)	44.2 (6.8)	54.1 (12.3)	59.0 (15.0)	58.8 (14.9)	52.5 (11.4)	41.7 (5.4)	32.7 (0.4)	22.6 (−5.2)	38.2 (3.5)
Mean monthly sunshine hours	91.3	108.0	163.7	204.7	258.3	287.1	306.7	266.4	207.6	159.4	84.4	69.0	2,206.6
Percentage possible sunshine	31	37	44	51	57	63	66	62	55	47	29	25	49
Average ultraviolet index	1	2	4	6	7	8	8	8	6	4	2	1	5
Source 1: NOAA (relative humidity and sun 1961–1990)
Source 2: Weather Atlas

Climate data for Rochester, New York (Greater Rochester Int'l), 1991–2020 normals, (Note: Mean monthly maxima and minima (i.e. the expected highest and lowest temperature readings at any point during the year or given month) calculated based on data at said location from 1991 to 2020.) extremes 1871−present (Note: Official records for Rochester kept January 1871 to September 1940 at downtown and at Greater Rochester Int'l since October 1940. For more information, see Threadex)
Month	Jan	Feb	Mar	Apr	May	Jun	Jul	Aug	Sep	Oct	Nov	Dec	Year
Record high °F (°C)	74 (23)	73 (23)	86 (30)	93 (34)	94 (34)	100 (38)	102 (39)	99 (37)	99 (37)	91 (33)	81 (27)	72 (22)	102 (39)
Mean maximum °F (°C)	57.2 (14.0)	55.1 (12.8)	67.1 (19.5)	79.9 (26.6)	86.7 (30.4)	90.5 (32.5)	92.1 (33.4)	90.4 (32.4)	87.7 (30.9)	80.0 (26.7)	68.5 (20.3)	57.5 (14.2)	93.4 (34.1)
Mean daily maximum °F (°C)	33.4 (0.8)	35.2 (1.8)	43.6 (6.4)	55.5 (13.1)	69.4 (20.8)	77.9 (25.5)	82.5 (28.1)	80.5 (26.9)	73.6 (23.1)	61.2 (16.2)	49.1 (9.5)	38.5 (3.6)	58.5 (14.7)
Daily mean °F (°C)	26.2 (−3.2)	27.4 (−2.6)	35.2 (1.8)	46.8 (8.2)	58.8 (14.9)	67.6 (19.8)	72.3 (22.4)	70.7 (21.5)	63.6 (17.6)	52.2 (11.2)	41.5 (5.3)	32.0 (0.0)	49.5 (9.7)
Mean daily minimum °F (°C)	19.0 (−7.2)	19.6 (−6.9)	26.8 (−2.9)	37.1 (2.8)	48.2 (9.0)	57.4 (14.1)	62.2 (16.8)	61.0 (16.1)	53.6 (12.0)	43.3 (6.3)	34.0 (1.1)	25.4 (−3.7)	40.6 (4.8)
Mean minimum °F (°C)	−0.8 (−18.2)	0.5 (−17.5)	8.4 (−13.1)	24.1 (−4.4)	34.4 (1.3)	43.9 (6.6)	50.7 (10.4)	49.2 (9.6)	39.6 (4.2)	29.7 (−1.3)	18.6 (−7.4)	7.7 (−13.5)	−3.7 (−19.8)
Record low °F (°C)	−17 (−27)	−22 (−30)	−9 (−23)	7 (−14)	26 (−3)	35 (2)	42 (6)	36 (2)	28 (−2)	19 (−7)	1 (−17)	−16 (−27)	−22 (−30)
Average precipitation inches (mm)	2.55 (65)	2.13 (54)	2.49 (63)	2.99 (76)	2.86 (73)	3.37 (86)	3.56 (90)	3.31 (84)	3.18 (81)	3.22 (82)	2.76 (70)	2.67 (68)	35.09 (891)
Average snowfall inches (cm)	27.4 (70)	23.1 (59)	17.9 (45)	3.0 (7.6)	0.1 (0.25)	0.0 (0.0)	0.0 (0.0)	0.0 (0.0)	0.0 (0.0)	0.1 (0.25)	8.1 (21)	22.3 (57)	102.0 (259)
Average extreme snow depth inches (cm)	9.2 (23)	8.6 (22)	9.3 (24)	1.5 (3.8)	0.0 (0.0)	0.0 (0.0)	0.0 (0.0)	0.0 (0.0)	0.0 (0.0)	0.0 (0.0)	3.3 (8.4)	6.4 (16)	13.8 (35)
Average precipitation days (≥ 0.01 in)	19.6	16.4	15.4	13.4	12.4	11.5	11.2	10.3	11.1	13.9	14.9	18.1	168.2
Average snowy days (≥ 0.1 in)	17.6	15.0	10.1	3.0	0.1	0.0	0.0	0.0	0.0	0.2	5.7	13.5	65.2
Average relative humidity (%)	74.0	74.1	71.0	67.0	67.2	69.4	69.7	74.3	76.8	74.5	76.3	77.5	72.6
Average dew point °F (°C)	16.3 (−8.7)	17.2 (−8.2)	25.0 (−3.9)	34.0 (1.1)	45.1 (7.3)	55.0 (12.8)	59.9 (15.5)	59.7 (15.4)	53.4 (11.9)	42.3 (5.7)	33.3 (0.7)	22.8 (−5.1)	38.7 (3.7)
Mean monthly sunshine hours	108.3	118.1	177.7	216.5	266.5	297.6	314.4	273.4	212.3	154.4	81.5	77.5	2,298.2
Percentage possible sunshine	37	40	48	54	59	65	68	63	57	45	28	28	52
Source: NOAA (relative humidity, dew point, and sun 1961–1990)

Climate data for Syracuse Hancock International Airport, New York (1991–2020 normals, (Note: Mean monthly maxima and minima (i.e. the expected highest and lowest temperature readings at any point during the year or given month) calculated based on data at said location from 1991 to 2020.) extremes 1902–present (Note: Official records for Syracuse kept at downtown from August 1902 to April 1938, Syracuse Municipal Airport from May 1938 to September 17, 1949, and at Syracuse Hancock Int'l since September 18, 1949.))
Month	Jan	Feb	Mar	Apr	May	Jun	Jul	Aug	Sep	Oct	Nov	Dec	Year
Record high °F (°C)	70 (21)	75 (24)	87 (31)	92 (33)	96 (36)	100 (38)	102 (39)	101 (38)	98 (37)	89 (32)	81 (27)	72 (22)	102 (39)
Mean maximum °F (°C)	57.1 (13.9)	54.3 (12.4)	66.9 (19.4)	80.6 (27.0)	87.8 (31.0)	91.2 (32.9)	92.8 (33.8)	91.4 (33.0)	88.4 (31.3)	79.6 (26.4)	68.7 (20.4)	59.1 (15.1)	94.3 (34.6)
Mean daily maximum °F (°C)	31.7 (−0.2)	33.6 (0.9)	42.4 (5.8)	56.4 (13.6)	69.2 (20.7)	77.3 (25.2)	81.7 (27.6)	80.3 (26.8)	73.1 (22.8)	60.1 (15.6)	48.3 (9.1)	37.1 (2.8)	57.6 (14.2)
Daily mean °F (°C)	24.1 (−4.4)	25.5 (−3.6)	33.8 (1.0)	46.3 (7.9)	58.2 (14.6)	67.0 (19.4)	71.8 (22.1)	70.4 (21.3)	62.9 (17.2)	51.3 (10.7)	40.5 (4.7)	30.4 (−0.9)	48.5 (9.2)
Mean daily minimum °F (°C)	16.5 (−8.6)	17.5 (−8.1)	25.2 (−3.8)	36.2 (2.3)	47.3 (8.5)	56.7 (13.7)	62.0 (16.7)	60.4 (15.8)	52.7 (11.5)	42.4 (5.8)	32.7 (0.4)	23.7 (−4.6)	39.4 (4.1)
Mean minimum °F (°C)	−6.1 (−21.2)	−3.0 (−19.4)	5.3 (−14.8)	23.2 (−4.9)	34.1 (1.2)	43.9 (6.6)	51.9 (11.1)	49.3 (9.6)	38.0 (3.3)	28.8 (−1.8)	17.5 (−8.1)	3.6 (−15.8)	−9.6 (−23.1)
Record low °F (°C)	−26 (−32)	−26 (−32)	−16 (−27)	7 (−14)	25 (−4)	34 (1)	44 (7)	38 (3)	25 (−4)	18 (−8)	−1 (−18)	−26 (−32)	−26 (−32)
Average precipitation inches (mm)	2.58 (66)	2.46 (62)	3.04 (77)	3.48 (88)	3.42 (87)	3.56 (90)	3.86 (98)	3.70 (94)	3.38 (86)	3.89 (99)	3.23 (82)	3.28 (83)	39.88 (1,013)
Average snowfall inches (cm)	34.0 (86)	30.3 (77)	19.8 (50)	3.0 (7.6)	0.1 (0.25)	0.0 (0.0)	0.0 (0.0)	0.0 (0.0)	0.0 (0.0)	0.2 (0.51)	9.8 (25)	30.6 (78)	127.8 (325)
Average extreme snow depth inches (cm)	12.9 (33)	13.5 (34)	11.1 (28)	1.4 (3.6)	0.0 (0.0)	0.0 (0.0)	0.0 (0.0)	0.0 (0.0)	0.0 (0.0)	0.0 (0.0)	4.1 (10)	9.9 (25)	18.5 (47)
Average precipitation days (≥ 0.01 in)	18.9	16.6	15.5	14.5	13.2	12.0	11.7	10.7	11.1	15.1	15.9	18.5	173.7
Average snowy days (≥ 0.1 in)	17.8	15.2	10.1	2.5	0.1	0.0	0.0	0.0	0.0	0.3	5.9	13.6	65.5
Average relative humidity (%)	73.2	72.3	69.6	65.2	67.1	69.9	70.5	74.9	76.4	74.3	75.4	76.8	72.1
Average dew point °F (°C)	15.3 (−9.3)	16.3 (−8.7)	24.1 (−4.4)	33.3 (0.7)	45.1 (7.3)	55.0 (12.8)	59.9 (15.5)	59.7 (15.4)	53.1 (11.7)	41.7 (5.4)	32.7 (0.4)	21.7 (−5.7)	38.2 (3.4)
Mean monthly sunshine hours	102.8	116.7	172.5	204.4	243.1	260.6	289.3	247.1	193.0	144.3	76.7	69.0	2,119.5
Percentage possible sunshine	35	40	47	51	53	57	62	57	51	42	26	25	48
Source: NOAA (relative humidity, dew point, and sun 1961–1990)

Climate data for Utica (Rome, New York), 1991–2020 normals, (Note: Humidity data calculated from the averages of morning and evening relative humidities.) (Note: Mean monthly maxima and minima (i.e. the expected highest and lowest temperature readings at any point during the year or given month) calculated based on data at said location from 1991 to 2020) extremes 1893–present
Month	Jan	Feb	Mar	Apr	May	Jun	Jul	Aug	Sep	Oct	Nov	Dec	Year
Record high °F (°C)	67 (19)	72 (22)	83 (28)	91 (33)	95 (35)	99 (37)	100 (38)	97 (36)	100 (38)	89 (32)	79 (26)	71 (22)	100 (38)
Mean maximum °F (°C)	53.5 (11.9)	52.4 (11.3)	61.5 (16.4)	80.5 (26.9)	87.8 (31.0)	89.9 (32.2)	92.1 (33.4)	89.5 (31.9)	88.4 (31.3)	78.1 (25.6)	67.9 (19.9)	56.6 (13.7)	93.4 (34.1)
Mean daily maximum °F (°C)	30.1 (−1.1)	31.8 (−0.1)	41.0 (5.0)	54.9 (12.7)	68.9 (20.5)	76.2 (24.6)	80.9 (27.2)	79.3 (26.3)	72.0 (22.2)	58.9 (14.9)	46.8 (8.2)	35.7 (2.1)	56.4 (13.6)
Daily mean °F (°C)	21.5 (−5.8)	22.5 (−5.3)	31.7 (−0.2)	44.5 (6.9)	56.8 (13.8)	65.3 (18.5)	70.2 (21.2)	68.7 (20.4)	61.4 (16.3)	49.7 (9.8)	39.0 (3.9)	28.3 (−2.1)	46.6 (8.1)
Mean daily minimum °F (°C)	12.9 (−10.6)	13.2 (−10.4)	22.5 (−5.3)	34.1 (1.2)	44.7 (7.1)	54.5 (12.5)	59.5 (15.3)	58.1 (14.5)	50.9 (10.5)	40.5 (4.7)	31.2 (−0.4)	20.9 (−6.2)	36.9 (2.7)
Mean minimum °F (°C)	−14.2 (−25.7)	−8.8 (−22.7)	1.3 (−17.1)	19.2 (−7.1)	29.7 (−1.3)	40.7 (4.8)	48.3 (9.1)	47.0 (8.3)	36.6 (2.6)	26.2 (−3.2)	14.0 (−10.0)	0.1 (−17.7)	−16.2 (−26.8)
Record low °F (°C)	−31 (−35)	−28 (−33)	−27 (−33)	0 (−18)	22 (−6)	31 (−1)	41 (5)	35 (2)	27 (−3)	16 (−9)	−4 (−20)	−26 (−32)	−34 (−37)
Average precipitation inches (mm)	2.50 (64)	2.37 (60)	3.43 (87)	3.72 (94)	4.46 (113)	4.20 (107)	4.25 (108)	3.60 (91)	3.95 (100)	4.67 (119)	3.72 (94)	2.95 (75)	43.82 (1,113)
Average snowfall inches (cm)	31.7 (81)	23.4 (59)	15.1 (38)	3.4 (8.6)	0.0 (0.0)	0.0 (0.0)	0.0 (0.0)	0.0 (0.0)	0.0 (0.0)	0.1 (0.25)	7.3 (19)	20.8 (53)	101.8 (259)
Average precipitation days (≥ 0.01 in)	12.9	14.2	13.2	15.5	14.9	14.0	13.1	13.7	13.4	17.1	15.7	17.0	174.7
Average snowy days (≥ 0.1 in)	15.9	11.7	8.2	2.8	0.0	0.0	0.0	0.0	0.0	0.4	4.2	13.5	56.7
Average relative humidity (%)	66.0	66.2	65.0	64.1	63.3	66.8	66.0	68.2	72.7	69.8	72.3	72.3	67.9
Percentage possible sunshine	42	46	52	58	64	66	65	60	54	48	43	40	53
Source 1: NOAA (snowfall 1981–2010), Western Regional Center
Source 2: Weatherbase

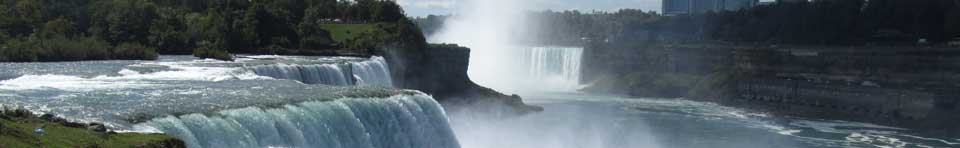
Niagara Falls in the Niagara Falls National Heritage Area

== Geographic divisions ==
=== Metropolitan areas and major cities ===
- Albany (state capital) - Schenectady - Troy (Capital District)
- Binghamton (Triple Cities)
- Buffalo - Cheektowaga (largest metropolitan area with the largest city (Buffalo))
- Elmira
- Glens Falls
- Ithaca
- Kingston
- Poughkeepsie - Newburgh - Middletown
- Rochester
- Syracuse (Central New York)
- Utica - Rome (Mohawk Valley)
- Watertown - Fort Drum
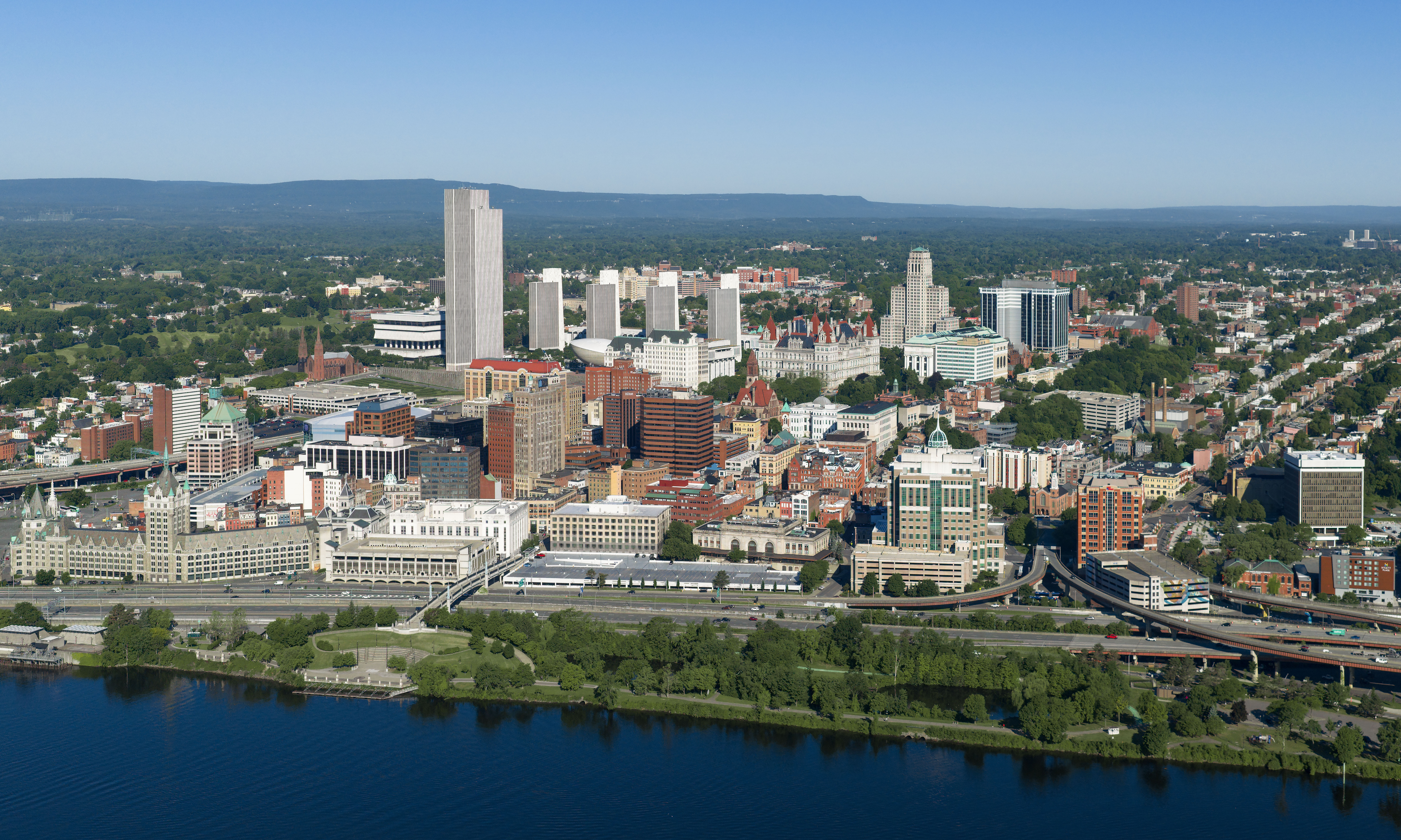
Albany

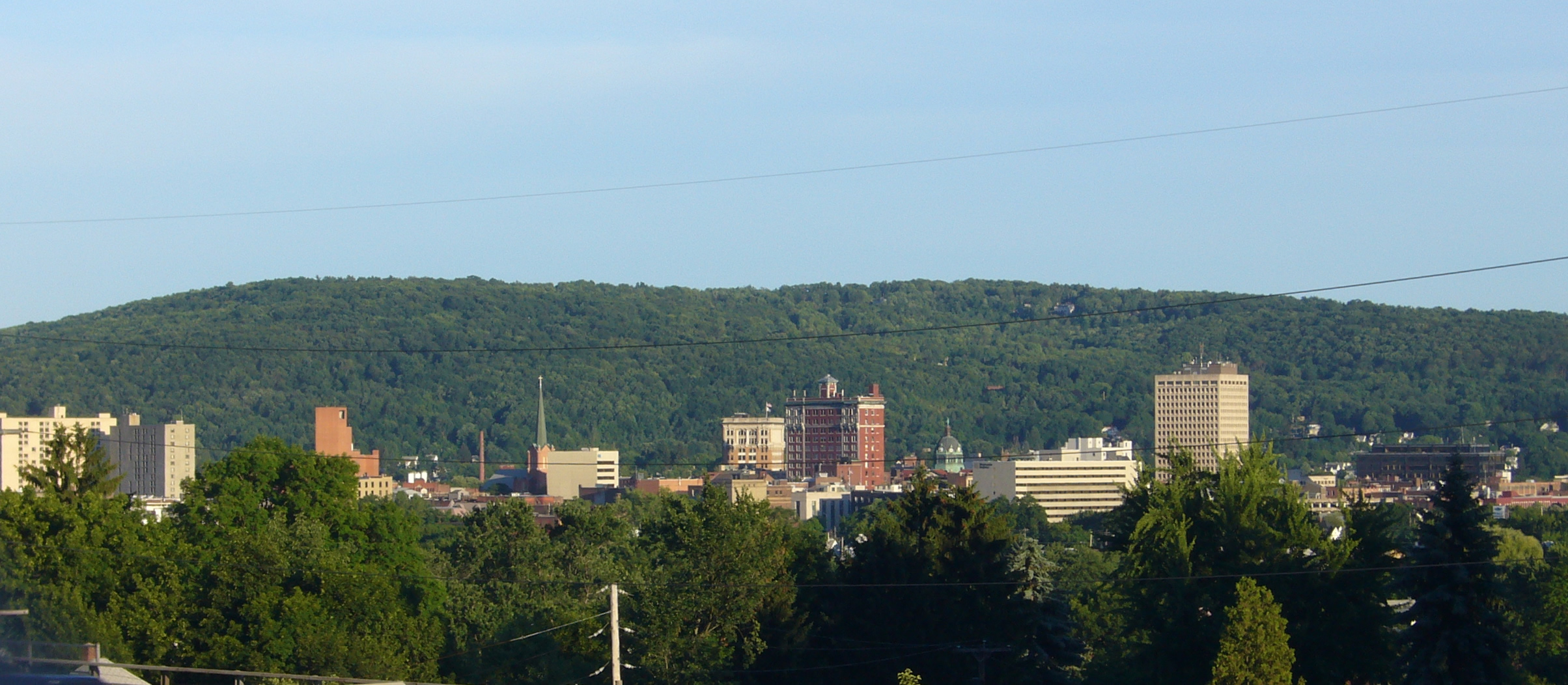
Binghamton

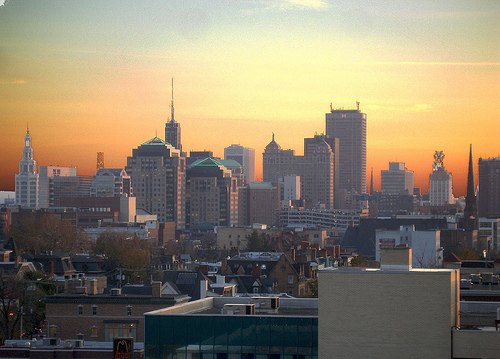
Buffalo

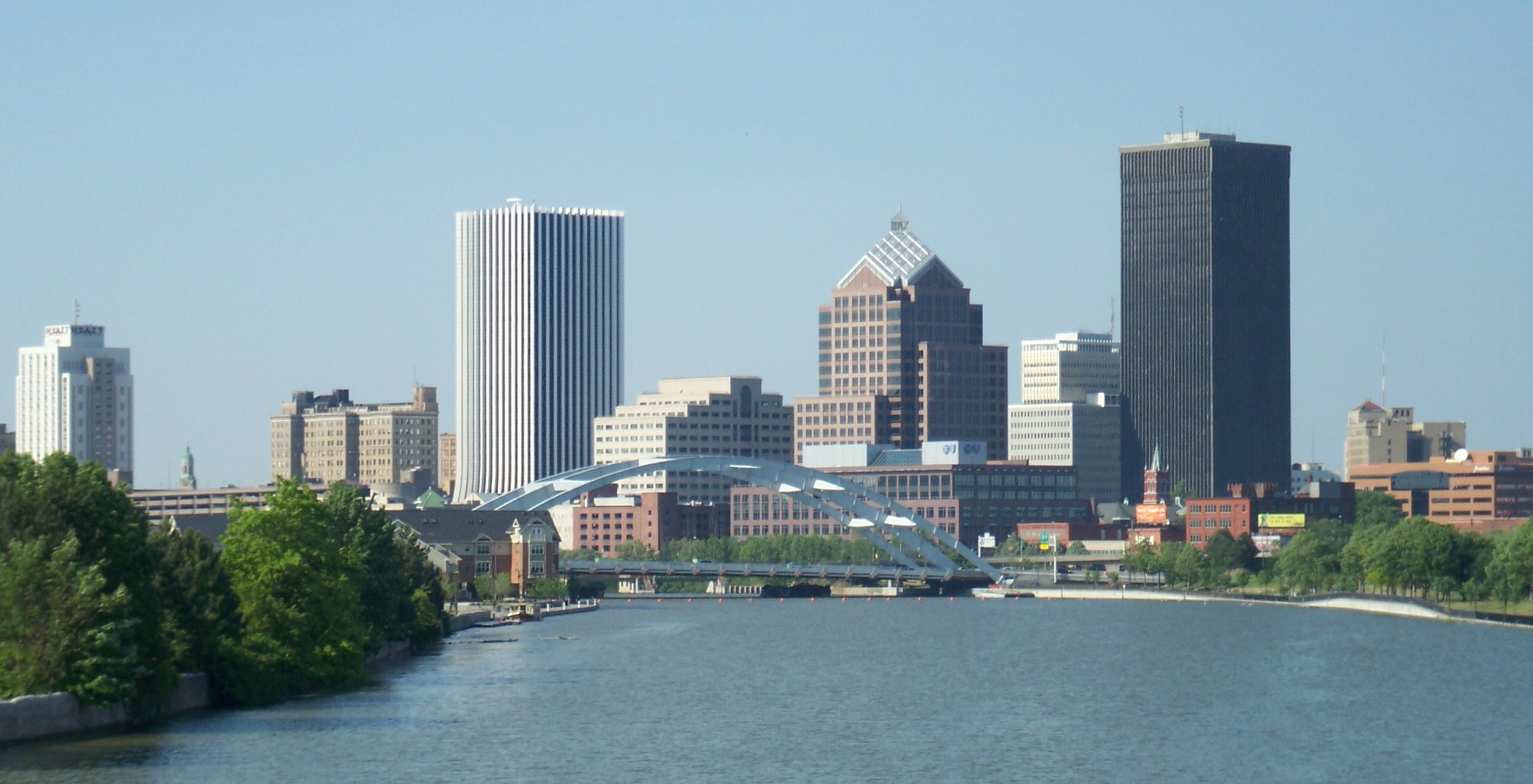
Rochester

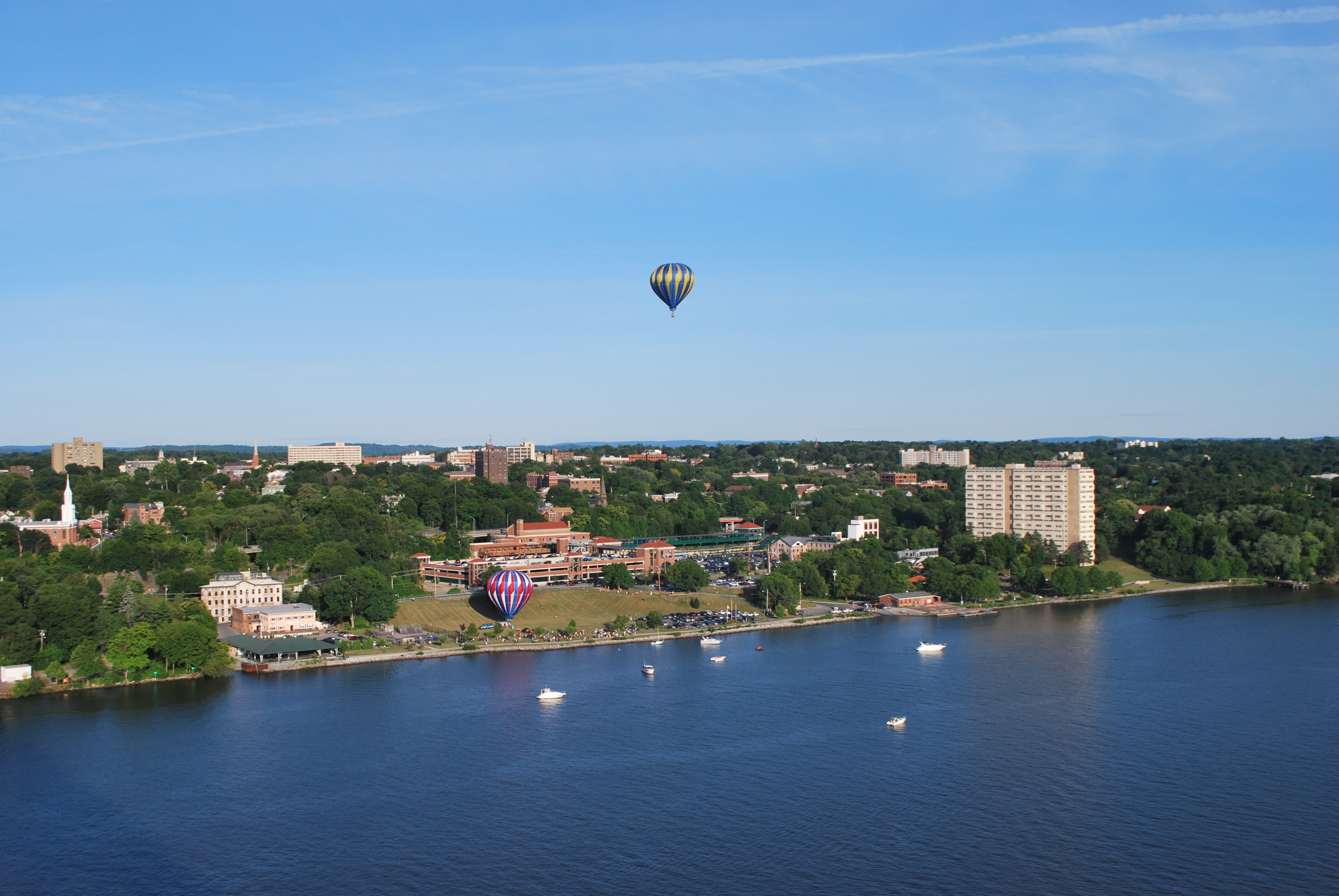
Poughkeepsie

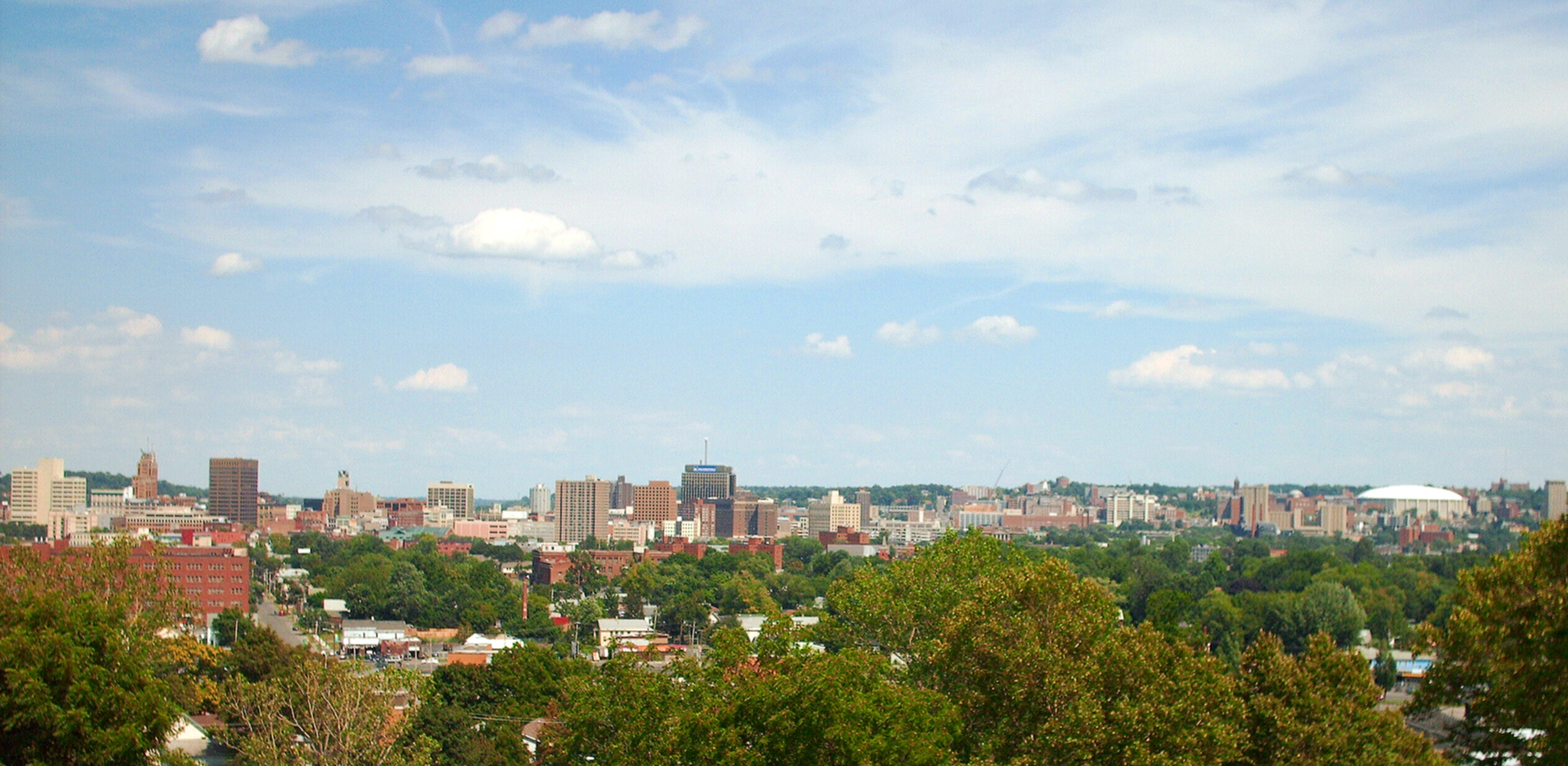
Syracuse

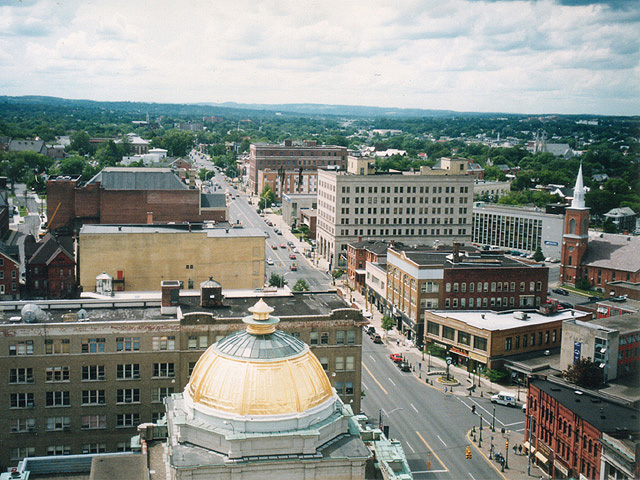
Utica

=== Subregions ===
The economic regions of New York state, including the approximate location of several Upstate New York subregions

- Adirondack Mountains
- Capital District (Albany and the surrounding area)
- Catskill Mountains
- Central-Leatherstocking Region (includes Cooperstown)
- Central New York (Syracuse and the surrounding area)
- Finger Lakes (between Rochester and Syracuse)
- Holland Purchase
- Hudson Valley (excluding Rockland and Westchester counties)
- Mohawk Valley (includes Utica and Schenectady)
- North Country (northern frontier of New York)
- Shawangunk Ridge
- Ski country (the northern boundary of the Southern Tier, includes Cortland, Clymer and Ellicottville)
- Southern Tier (just north of Pennsylvania, excluding the Catskills; includes Binghamton, Corning and Elmira)
- Tug Hill
- Western New York (the westernmost tip; includes Buffalo, Niagara Falls, Jamestown, and sometimes Rochester)

== Demographics ==
Ethnic ancestries in the United States

As of 2020, the population of New York State was 20,201,249, with 14,045,410 living in the New York metropolitan area, leaving 6,155,839 for the entire rest of the state. This would mean if upstate New York was a state it would the 20th most populated state in the U.S., while the New York metropolitan area would be the 4th most populated state in the U.S. Upstate New York with its larger area has a population density much lower than downstate. By area, upstate is typified by farmland and forest, many large lakes, and two (major) mountain ranges, with metro areas dotting the map. Residents of English colonial ancestry are common, as well as German, Irish, and Italian, with most metropolitan counties having a similar number of residents from each group.

The North Country is heavily French Canadian. Italian Americans are the largest ethnic group in Oneida County and Schenectady County, as well as in some counties in the Hudson Valley that are closest to New York City. Irish Americans represent the largest ethnic group from the Capital District, Syracuse, Binghamton, and the rest of the Hudson Valley, though the regions also have large Italian American populations. Irish population is consistently above 15% in most of upstate New York (reaching over 20% in the upper Hudson Valley), compared to less than 8% in most of New York City.

Buffalo and Utica also contain notably large contingent of residents with Polish and other Slavic ancestries. African Americans, and Americans of African descent, while not as numerous as in New York City, make up at least 25% of the residents in cities such as Buffalo, Rochester, Syracuse, and Albany.

There is also a significant presence of the indigenous Haudenosaunee or Six Nations in the region, who retain enclaves of tribal land: the Seneca Nation of Indians and Tonawanda Seneca Nation in Western New York, the Onondaga Nation south of Syracuse and the Oneida Indian Nation of Oneida County in Central New York, and in the North Country, the Mohawk Nation at Akwesasne caught between Franklin County, Ontario, and Québec. Members of the Six Nations also live across upstate New York outside of tribal lands.

== Economy ==
The median household income across New York State was $75,157 in 2021, however most upstate counties fall short of the statewide average. As of January 2023, the minimum wage in New York State, excluding New York City, Long Island, and Westchester County is $14.20 per hour, with a plan to increase the minimum wage to $15.00 per hour. There are two Fortune 500 companies located in upstate New York: Constellation Brands, in Victor, in Ontario County, and Corning Inc. Depending on the definition of upstate, there are nine or ten foreign trade zones in upstate New York (nine are located in counties almost always considered upstate, and one is located in Orange County). The upstate economy remains behind the economy of the New York Metropolitan Area, and downstate represented 88 percent of the job growth for the entire state. Between 2010 and 2018, job growth in Brooklyn alone exceeded that of upstate New York.

Upstate New York boasts a sizeable mining sector. New York State is among the top third of states in the United States by value of minerals produced, much of which is from upstate regions. Central New York is a major salt producing area, contributing to the state's position as the third largest producer of salt in the U.S. Additionally, New York State ranks first in the production of garnet, the state gemstone, and is the only state that produces wollastonite. Mining of these two minerals within New York takes place entirely within upstate counties. Logging is also an important sector in the region. In 2019, New York State produced 124 million cubic feet of timber, 50.4% of which was sugar maple wood. Sawmills producing wood in New York are almost all within the upstate region.

Upstate New York also has a substantive outdoor recreation industry. The Adirondack Park, by far the largest in the state, is annually visited by between 7 and 12 million people, a greater number than annually visit the Grand Canyon. In 2020, over 241,000 jobs in New York State were supported by the outdoor recreation industry, and the sector plays an especially important role in rural parts of the state. New York State has the largest number of ski resorts in the United States at 52. The majority of these are located in upstate New York, and by most definitions of the region, it contains more than ski resorts than Michigan, the state with the next highest total.

=== Agriculture ===
A number of agricultural products are grown in upstate New York, including dairy, corn, hay, fruits, cabbage, and potatoes. The region has a significant dairy industry, and New York State is the largest producer of yogurt, cottage cheese, and sour cream and third-largest producer of dairy overall in the United States. Chobani, the largest producer of yogurt in the United States, is located in upstate New York. The region is also a significant producer of wine. New York State produces the second most wine of any state, the majority of wine produced being from upstate regions (85% of which was produced in the area surrounding the Finger Lakes). New York State is also the second-largest producer of apples, snap peas, maple syrup, and cabbage in the United States, with agricultural output of these goods being highest in upstate counties.

=== Manufacturing ===
Upstate New York also has a significant manufacturing sector. A number of semiconductor manufacturers are located in the region, including the headquarters and a manufacturing facility of GlobalFoundries, the world's fourth largest semiconductor manufacturer, in Malta, in Saratoga County. Other facilities entering the region include a Micron location in Clay, in Onondaga County, and a Wolfspeed facility in Marcy, in Oneida County. In addition to semiconductor manufacturing, upstate New York has notable glass production. Corning Inc., one of the largest glassmakers in the world and the developer of Gorilla Glass, is located in Corning, New York. In the late nineteenth century, the region was considered one of the centers of glassmaking in the country, earning Corning the name "The Crystal City". Other manufacturing includes Tesla's Gigafactory 2 in Buffalo.

=== Energy ===
Upstate New York has a significant energy sector, and the region accounts for over half of the energy production in the state. The majority of upstate electricity produced comes from nuclear and renewable sources. In 2017, these sources accounted for 91% of energy produced in the upstate region, as defined by the New York State Independent Systems Operator. New York State as a whole is the third highest producer of hydroelectric power in the United States, the majority of which is produced in upstate. The third-largest conventional hydroelectric power plant in the United States, Robert Moses Niagara Hydroelectric Power Plant, is located in the region. Upstate New York also produces all of the state's nuclear energy, and all three of New York State's Nuclear Power Plants are located upstate after the closure of the Indian Point Energy Center in 2021. Nuclear Power, the second largest in-state mode of electricity generation, is produced at the James A. FitzPatrick Nuclear Power Plant and the Nine Mile Nuclear Power Plant, both in Scriba, and the R.E. Ginna Plant, in Ontario, NY. Other major modes of energy production in the region include wind, and natural gas.

== Culture ==
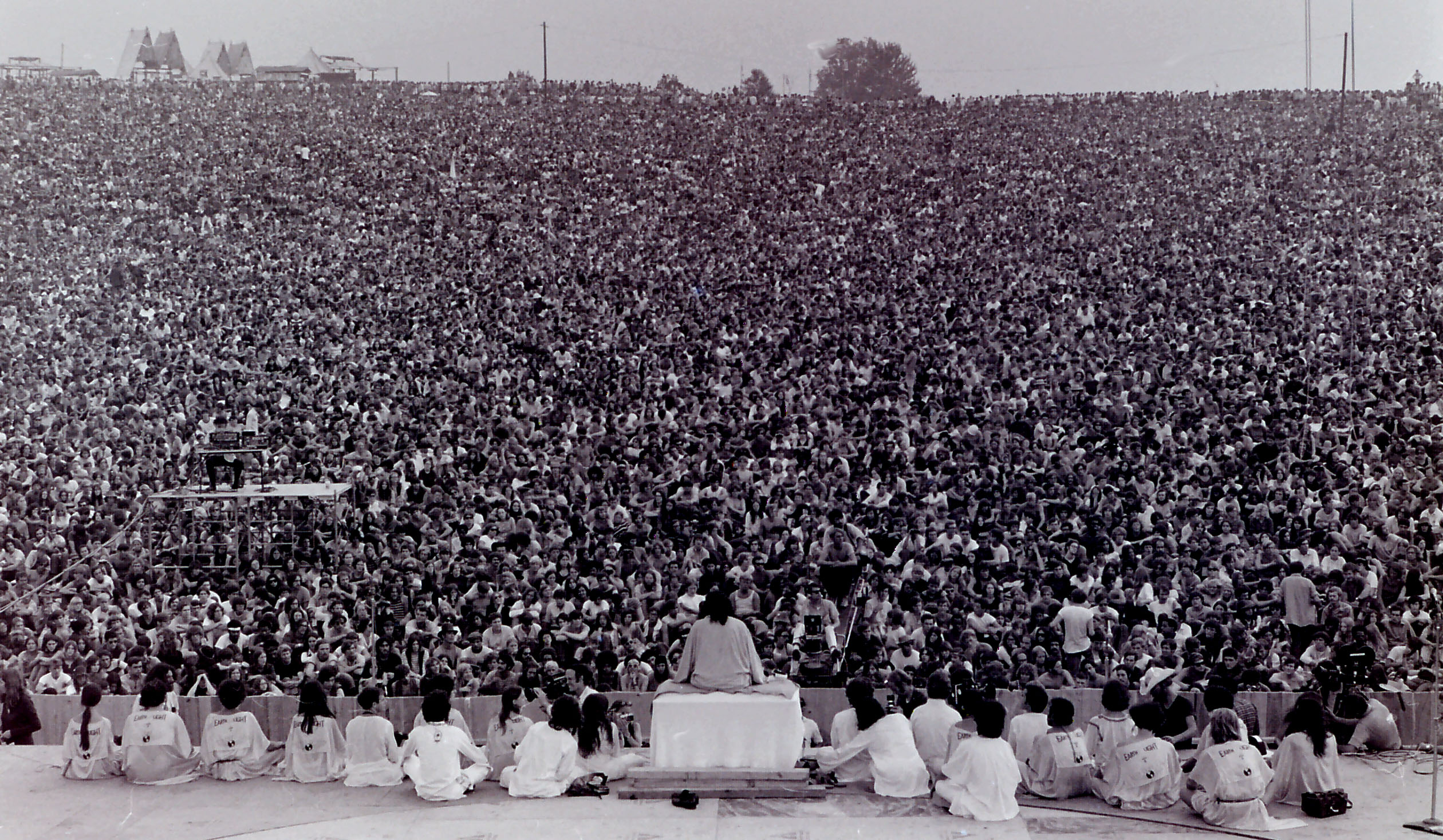
The opening ceremony at Woodstock on August 15, 1969; the outdoor concert drew over 400,000 attendees and 32 acts that performed in sporadic rain on a dairy farm owned by Max Yasgur.

The other regions of New York are culturally and economically distinct from the New York City area and in many ways from each other. By area, most of New York is characterized by agricultural and forested rural communities, and by small and medium-sized cities and their surrounding suburbs located along major transportation corridors. The state's major metropolitan areas outside of New York City are Buffalo, Rochester, Syracuse, and Albany-Schenectady-Troy, each of whose population exceeds 500,000.

The different regions of New York are influenced by and have affinities with other adjacent regions. Western New York has cultural and economic ties to the other Great Lakes states as well as Southern Ontario and is effectively, along with Northwestern Pennsylvania, an eastward extension of Midwestern United States culture. The Capital District, the Hudson Valley, the Mohawk Valley and the Plattsburgh area have ties to New England. The North Country, the extreme northern portion of the state, also has strong cultural, economic, linguistic and familial ties to Quebec and Eastern Ontario. Thus, Plattsburgh has close ties to its neighbors in the Montreal area as well as Vermont. Much of New York receives television and radio broadcasts from Canada, and there are often other cross-border ties, both historical and familial. A similar relationship can be seen in northern New England.

Upstate New York from Western New York east to Utica is linguistically part of the Inland North region of American English dialectology, a region which includes Midwestern cities as far west as Chicago and Milwaukee. The Hudson and lower Mohawk Valley regions have more in common dialectologically with western New England and New York City. The boundary between the use of the words pop and soda to refer to soft drinks falls farther west than the edge of the Inland North, running just to around the city of Rochester. Buffalo and areas west of Rochester use pop, like the rest of the Inland North to the west, whereas areas east of Rochester, like Syracuse and Binghamton, use soda, like New England and New York City. In Ithaca and Elmira, the border is less clear, with some people having grown up with pop and some with soda; however, current trends see Ithaca, at least, turning to mostly "soda".

Foodways indigenous to regions of upstate New York include:

- Buffalo wings and beef on weck sandwich (Buffalo)
- Cornell chicken barbecue (Ithaca)
- Garbage Plate (Rochester)
- white hot dogs, known as a white hot or Coney (Rochester, Central and Western New York)
- salt potatoes (Syracuse)
- spiedies (Binghamton)
- chicken riggies, tomato pies, Utica greens, and halfmoon cookies (Utica)
- Michigan hot dogs, a variety of the Coney Island hot dog (Plattsburgh)
- Texas hots, a Greek-inspired variety of the Coney Island hot dog (Jamestown and Wellsville)
- Pizza logs, an egg roll with pizza filling (Sanborn)

Although legends lay claim that the potato chip was invented in Saratoga Springs, it has achieved such universal popularity that it is no longer identified with the region. Winemaking is a growing industry in the Finger Lakes as well as in Chautauqua County, where Welch's operates one of the oldest extant grape juice factories in the United States. In the center of the Finger Lakes region, Ithaca is known for the Bo Burger, a cheeseburger with a fried egg on top.

Two of the most important rock festivals of the 20th century were held in upstate New York. In 1969 the Woodstock Festival was held in Bethel, New York, while in 1973 another multiday festival was held at the Watkins Glen International Raceway.

Some literary, documentary and cinematic depictions of upstate present a sense of small town, simple lifestyles, such as It's a Wonderful Life, set in a small upstate town (probably based on Seneca Falls) in the 1940s.

== Politics ==
Often attributed to the region's semi-rural to rural character, there is more conservatism in culture and politics than found in the more urban downstate area, and the region is the power base of the state's Republican Party. Upstate New York does, however, have several Democratic-dominated counties, including Erie County (Buffalo), Monroe County (Rochester), Onondaga County (Syracuse), Tompkins County (Ithaca), and Albany County (Albany).

As a whole, upstate New York is roughly equally divided in federal elections between Democrats and Republicans. In 2004, John Kerry defeated George W. Bush by fewer than 1,500 votes (1,553,246 votes to 1,551,971) in the upstate region.

=== Relationship with New York City ===
New York City is dependent on upstate New York for a variety of services: the latter is the source of the city's water supply via the Delaware Aqueduct and the Catskill Aqueduct; much of the city's electric power supply comes from state-owned hydroelectric plants at Niagara Falls and the St. Lawrence River; and most of the state's prisons are upstate; hence the popular term "being sent up the river" (however, the term originally referred to Sing Sing, which is "up the Hudson River" from New York City, but being in Ossining in Westchester County is still in the "downstate" region). Conversely, the operation of state facilities providing these services is an important part of the upstate economy.

== Historic events ==
- The Albany Congress, 1754
- Battle of Valcour Island, 1776
- Battle of Oriskany, 1777
- Battles of Saratoga, turning point of the American Revolutionary War, 1777
- Cherry Valley massacre, 1778
- Sullivan Campaign, 1779
- Second Great Awakening in the burned-over district, early 1800s
- Battle of Plattsburgh, 1814
- The Morgan Affair, 1826
- Publication of the Book of Mormon, 1830
- The Caroline Affair, 1837
- Seneca Falls Convention, the first women's rights convention held in the United States, 1848
- Jerry Rescue, 1851
- Angola Horror train wreck, 1867
- Founding of the American Red Cross, 1881
- First execution via the electric chair, in Auburn Prison in 1890
- Assassination of President William McKinley in Buffalo, 1901
- Split Rock Explosion, 1918
- Remington Rand strike of 1936–1937
- Allegheny Reservoir construction, 1961–1967
- Northeast blackout of 1965
- Woodstock music festival, 1969
- Attica Prison riot, 1971
- Hurricane Agnes, 1972
- Winter Olympics, 1980
- New York State Labor Day derechos, 1998
- Northeast blackout of 2003
- Lake Storm Aphid, 2006
- Hurricane Irene, 2011
- Tropical Storm Lee, 2011
- Winter Storm Knife, 2014

=== Journalists ===
- Gordon Ackerman
- Samuel Hopkins Adams, muckraker, born in Dunkirk
- Wolf Blitzer, raised in Buffalo
- Amy Dickinson, Chicago Tribune advice columnist; grew up on a dairy farm in Freeville
- Frederick Douglass (1818–1895), editor and publisher of abolitionist newspapers: The North Star, published in Rochester, Frederick Douglass Weekly, Frederick Douglass' Paper, Douglass' Monthly and New National Era
- Ira Joe Fisher, author and weatherman, born and raised in Little Valley
- Megyn Kelly, television news anchor and political commentator
- Verlyn Klinkenborg, member of the New York Times editorial board; writer and farmer
- Francis Mallison of Rome; journalist, editor and public servant. Editor of the Rome Sentinel, reporter for the Brooklyn Eagle. He and editor Joseph Howard Jr. organized the "Great Civil War Gold Hoax", for which he was held as a prisoner of war.
- Henry Jarvis Raymond, born in Lima, founder of the New York Times. He was the newspaper's editor until his death.
- Andy Rooney, radio and television writer and broadcaster
- Tim Russert, host of NBC's Meet the Press, born and raised in Buffalo
- William James Stillman, author, diplomat, and photographer; born in Schenectady
- Dorothy Thompson, journalist and radio broadcaster; born in Lancaster
- Tom Toles, political cartoonist; from Buffalo
- Scott Wallace of Utica, author of The Unconquered: In Search of the Amazon's Last Uncontacted Tribes
- James Watson Webb, born in Claverack and raised in Cooperstown; publisher of the New York newspapers the Morning Courier and the New York Enquirer, which he consolidated as the Courier and Enquirer. He also became a United States diplomat and a New York politician in the Whig and Republican parties.
- John Zogby of Utica, pollster and blogger

=== Social, political and religious movements ===
- Abolitionism in the United States
- Anti-Masonic Party
- The Anti-Rent War
- Ararat, City of Refuge
- Brothertown
- The Chautauqua Institution
- The Frankean Synod
- Ganienkeh Territory
- The Inspirationalists
- Kanatsiohareke
- Latter Day Saint movement
- Lily Dale
- The Millerites
- Modern Spiritualism
- The Oneida Community
- The Second Great Awakening
- The Shakers
- The Universal Friends
- Women's suffrage

==== Spiritual and religious figures ====
- Jehudi Ashmun, religious leader and social reformer born in Champlain, New York. He was an agent of the American Colonization Society which promoted the settlement of blacks at Monrovia, Liberia, and was effectively governor of the colony from 1824 to 1828.
- Antoinette Brown, minister, abolitionist and suffragist. Born in Henrietta, she was the first woman to be ordained a minister in the United States. She served a congregation in South Butler.
- Saint Marianne Cope, Catholic religious sister who ministered to the leper colony in Hawaii without contracting the disease
- Avery Dulles, S.J., born in Auburn; noted theologian and cardinal of the Roman Catholic Church
- Charles Grandison Finney
- Harry Emerson Fosdick, clergyman; born in Buffalo, and graduated from Colgate University
- George Washington Gale
- Beriah Green
- Handsome Lake
- Mother Ann Lee
- Oren Lyons
- David Marks
- William Miller
- Mordecai Manuel Noah
- John Humphrey Noyes
- The Public Universal Friend
- Walter Rauschenbusch, a Christian theologian, Baptist minister and a key figure in the Social Gospel movement in the United States; born in Rochester. His father was a preacher who taught at the Rochester Theological Seminary.
- Joseph Smith
- Saint Kateri Tekakwitha

== Major highways ==
- The New York State Thruway
- The Adirondack Northway
- The Taconic State Parkway
- Interstate 81
- Interstate 84
- Interstate 86, incorporating the Southern Tier Expressway and the Quickway
- Interstate 87
- Interstate 88
- Interstate 90

== Major universities and colleges ==
=== Public ===
- Alfred State College (SUNY)
- Binghamton University (SUNY)
- Empire State University (SUNY)
- SUNY Brockport
- SUNY Buffalo State University
- SUNY Canton
- SUNY Cobleskill
- SUNY College of Environmental Science and Forestry
- SUNY Cortland
- SUNY Delhi
- SUNY Fredonia
- SUNY Geneseo
- SUNY Morrisville
- SUNY New Paltz
- SUNY Oneonta
- SUNY Oswego
- SUNY Plattsburgh
- SUNY Polytechnic Institute
- SUNY Potsdam
- SUNY Upstate Medical University
- United States Military Academy at West Point
- University at Albany (SUNY)
- University at Buffalo (SUNY)

=== Private ===
- Alfred University
- Bard College
- Canisius College
- Cazenovia College
- Clarkson University
- Colgate University
- Cornell University
- D'Youville College
- Elmira College
- Hamilton College
- Hartwick College
- Hobart and William Smith Colleges
- Houghton College
- Iona University
- Ithaca College
- Keuka College
- Le Moyne College
- Manhattan University
- Marist College
- Mount Saint Mary College
- Nazareth College
- Niagara University
- Paul Smith's College
- Rensselaer Polytechnic Institute
- Roberts Wesleyan College
- University of Rochester
- Rochester Institute of Technology
- Russell Sage College
- St. Bonaventure University
- St. John Fisher University
- St. Lawrence University
- Skidmore College
- Siena College
- Syracuse University
- Union College
- Utica College
- Vassar College
- Wells College

== Major tourist attractions and destinations ==
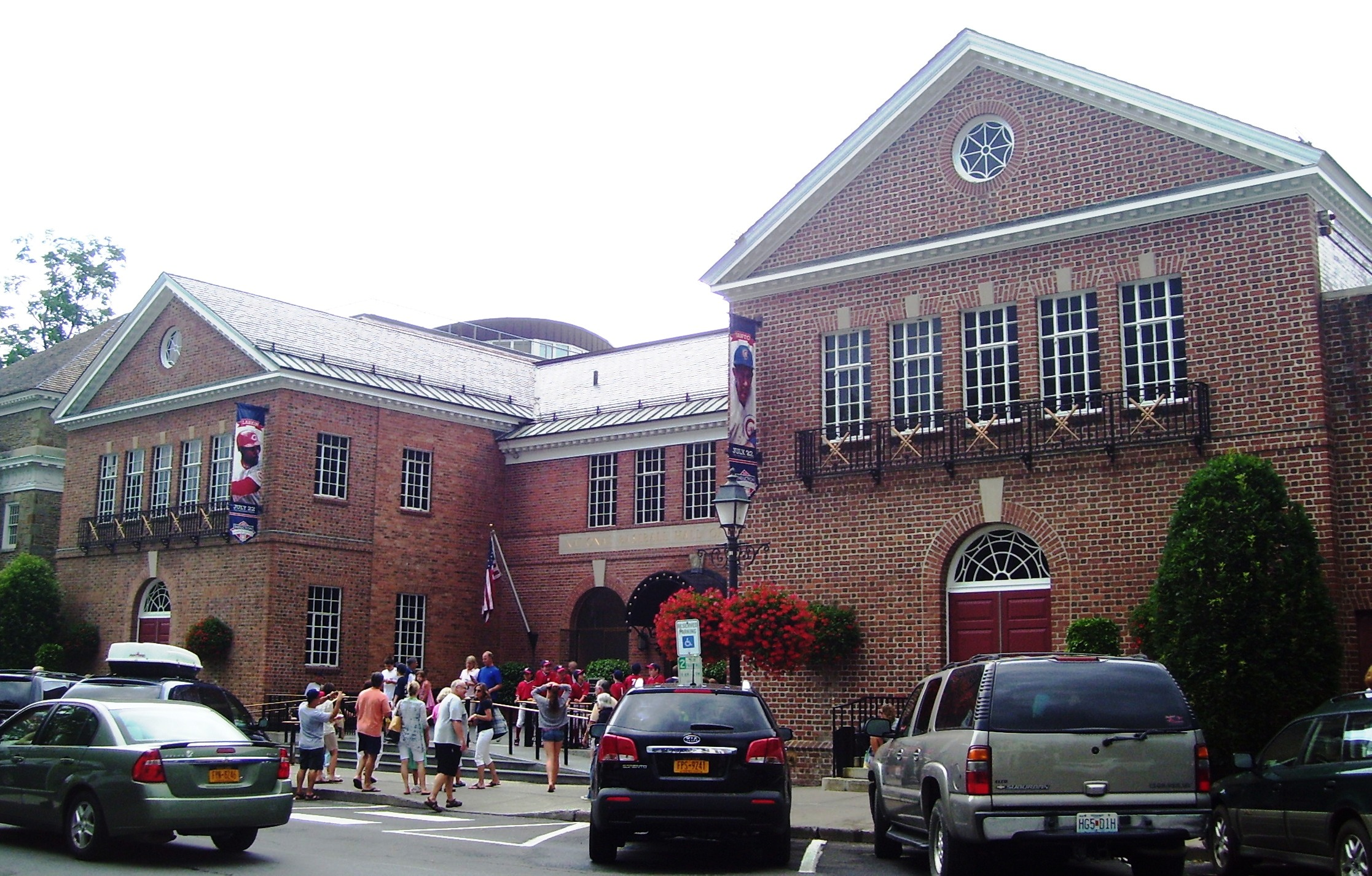
The National Baseball Hall of Fame and Museum in Cooperstown, New York

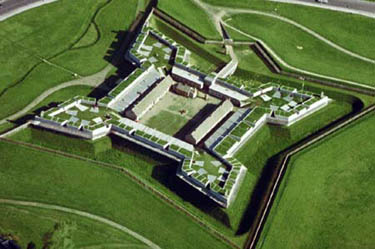
Fort Stanwix in Rome, New York

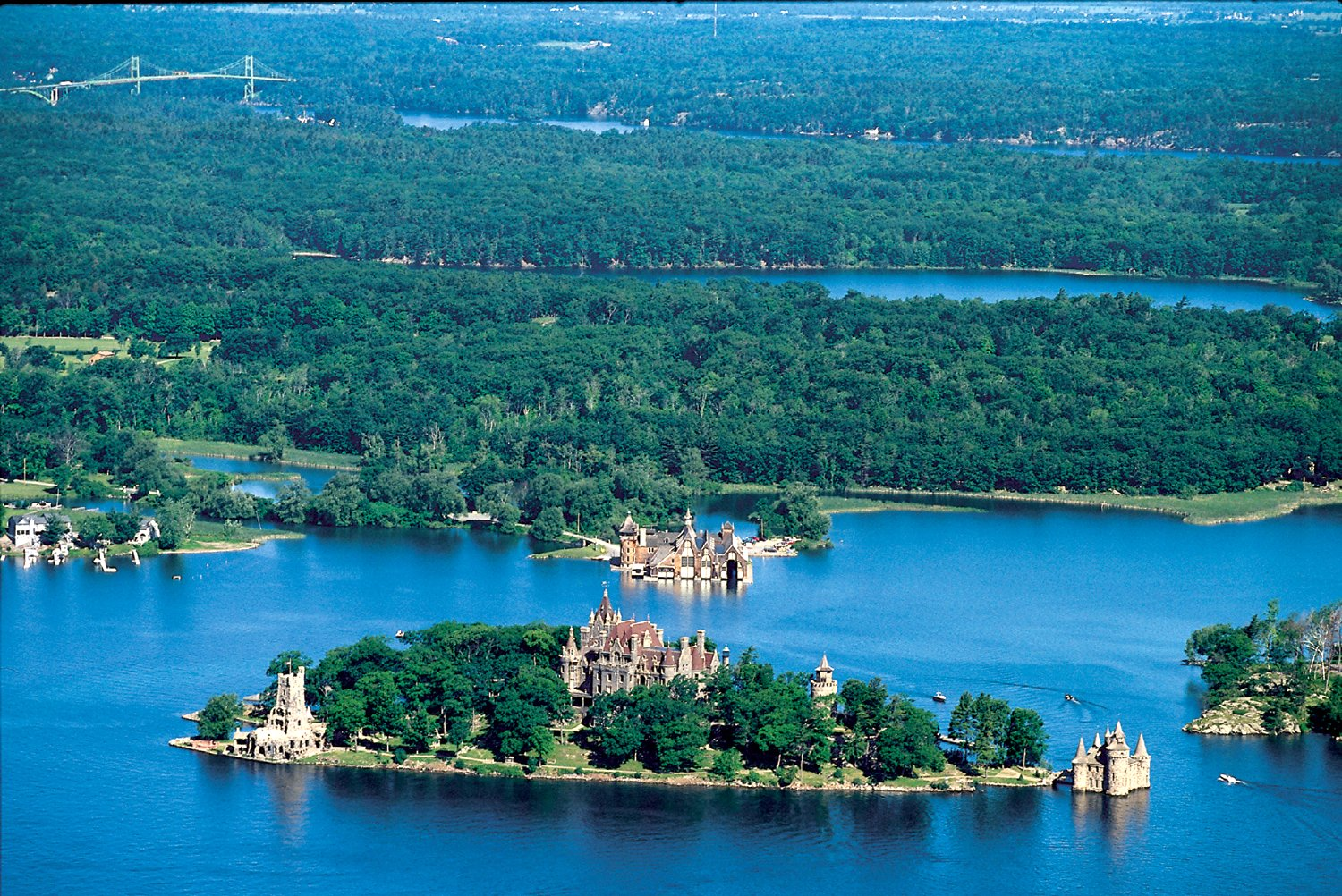
Boldt Castle on Heart Island in the Thousand Islands

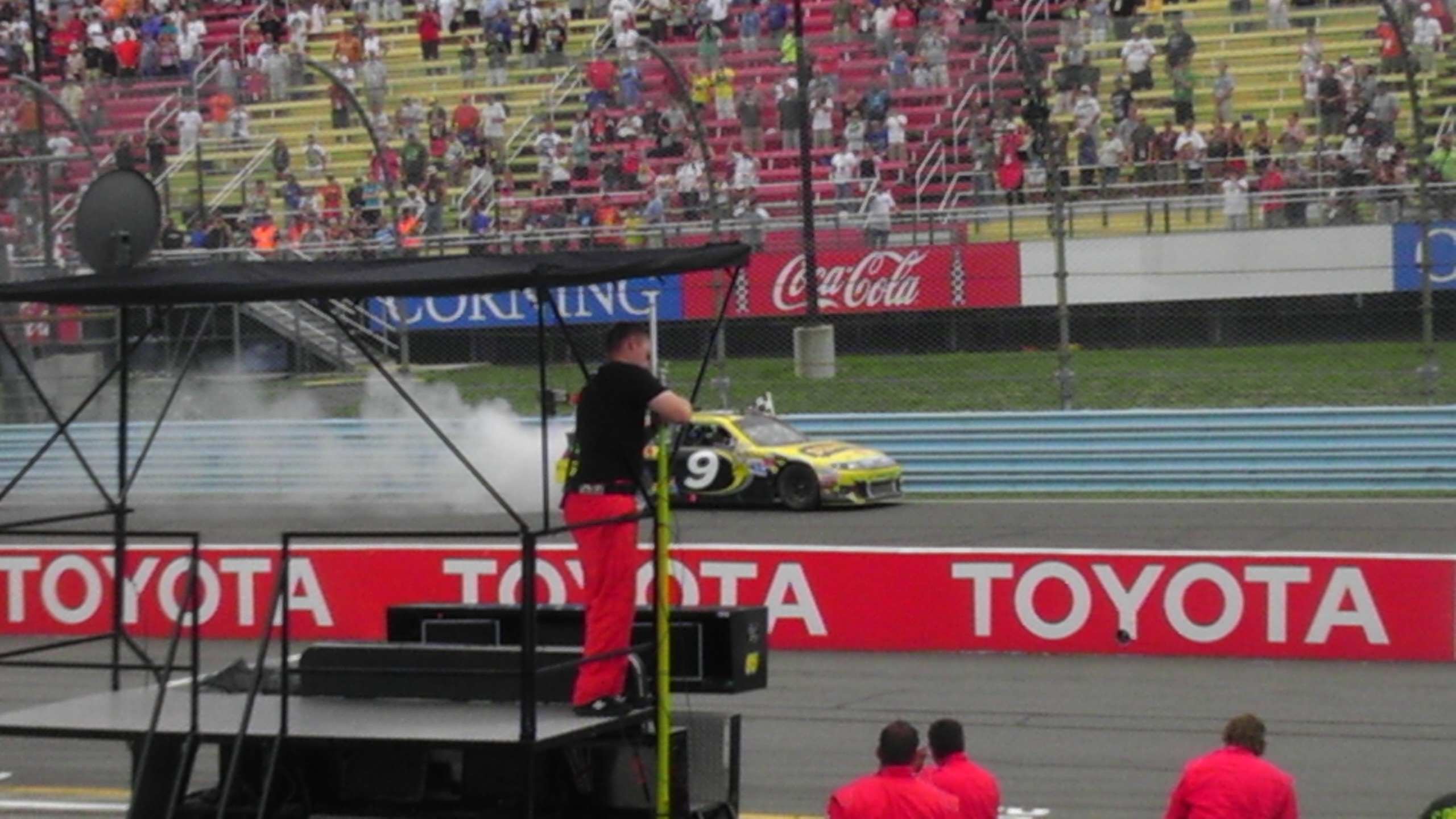
The NASCAR Cup Series at Watkins Glen International Raceway in Watkins Glen, New York

- Adirondack Mountains
- Ausable Chasm
- Baseball Hall of Fame (in Cooperstown)
- Catskill Mountains
- Corning Museum of Glass
- Destiny USA Mall (in Syracuse)
- Enchanted Forest Water Safari (in Old Forge)
- Erie Canal
- Fenimore Farm & Country Village (in Cooperstown)
- Finger Lakes
- Fort Niagara
- Fort Ontario
- Fort Stanwix
- Fort Ticonderoga
- Harness Racing Museum & Hall of Fame (in Goshen)
- Howe Caverns
- International Boxing Hall of Fame (in Canastota)
- Lake George
- Lake Placid
- Letchworth State Park
- National Distance Running Hall of Fame (in Utica)
- National Museum of Dance (in Saratoga Springs)
- National Women's Hall of Fame (in Seneca Falls)
- Niagara Falls
- Saratoga Race Course
- Seabreeze Amusement Park (in Irondequoit)
- Six Flags Darien Lake
- Six Flags Great Escape Resort (in Queensbury)
- Sylvan Beach
- Thousand Islands
- Turning Stone Resort Casino (in Verona)
- Watkins Glen International Raceway

== See also ==
- Downstate Illinois
- Hoaxes and legends of upstate New York
- List of people from New York (state)
- Northern Michigan
- Outline of New York
- Sports in upstate New York
  - Bills–Jets rivalry
