= Andrew Hoffman =

American environmental and sustainability scholar

Andrew J. Hoffman
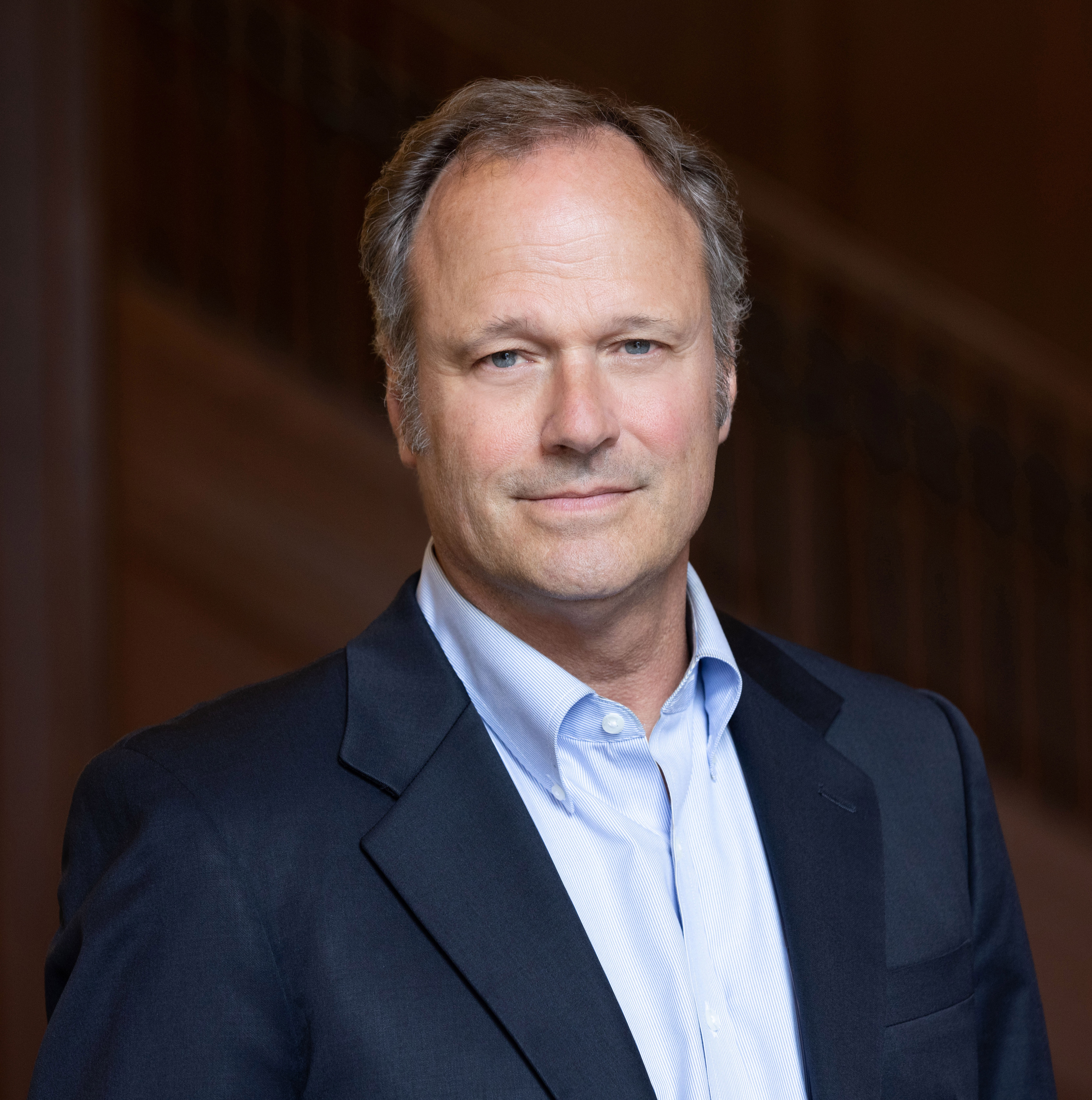
- Hoffman in 2023
- Born: 1961 (age 64–65); Easton, Pennsylvania, U.S.
- Occupation: Professor

Academic background
- Education: University of Massachusetts Amherst (B.S.); Massachusetts Institute of Technology (M.S., Ph.D.)
- Website: andrewhoffman.net

Andrew John Hoffman (born 1961) is a scholar of environmental issues and sustainable business. He is the Holcim Professor in Sustainable Enterprise at the University of Michigan.

== Career ==
After graduating, Hoffman worked as a carpenter on construction jobs in Nantucket, working his way up to project manager on new builds in Connecticut. His 2010 memoir Builder's Apprentice covers these years.

Since 2004, he has been Holcim Professor in Sustainable Enterprise at the University of Michigan, with joint appointments at the Ross School of Business and the School for Environment and Sustainability (SEAS). He has also served as Faculty Director and Associate Director of the Frederick A. and Barbara M. Erb Institute for Global Sustainable Enterprise, and as Education Director at the Graham Sustainability Institute.

Prior to the University of Michigan, he completed a post-doctoral fellowship at the Kellogg School of Management at Northwestern University and served on the faculty of the Boston University School of Management (now the Boston University Questrom School of Business).

He earned his BS in Chemical Engineering from the University of Massachusetts at Amherst, his MS in Civil & Environmental Engineering from MIT, and his PhD in both Management and Civil & Environmental Engineering from MIT. For his PhD, he studied under John Ehrenfeld, Fred Moavenzadeh, David H. Marks, Willie Ocasio, William F. Pounds and Robert Thomas.

== Awards ==
In October 2025, Hoffman was named the MBA Professor of the Year by Poets & Quants magazine. In 2024, he received the Faculty Teaching Award from the United Nations Principles for Responsible Management (UN PRME). In 2023, he received the Victor L. Bernard Teaching Leadership Award from the Ross School of Business. The Aspen Institute awarded him the Ideas Worth Teaching Award in 2017, the Faculty Pioneer Award in 2016, and the Rising Star Award in 2003. The Organizations and the Natural Environment Division of the Academy of Management awarded him the 2020 Teaching Award and the 2013 Distinguished Service Award. He was awarded the Dr. Alfred N. and Lynn Manos Page Prize for Sustainability Issues in Business in both 2020 and 2009.

== Selected works ==
=== Books ===
Hoffman has published nineteen books. Some notable ones include:

- Hoffman, Andrew J. (April 2025). Business School and the Noble Purpose of the Market: Correcting the Systemic Failures of Shareholder Capitalism. Stanford University Press. ISBN 978-1-5036-4246-1. Silver medal winner in the "Business Theory" category of the 2026 Axiom Book Awards.
- Hoffman, Andrew J. (March 2021). The Engaged Scholar: Expanding the Impact of Academic Research in Today's World. Stanford University Press. ISBN 978-1-5036-2925-7. Winner of the 2022 Responsible Research in Business Management Book Award.
- Hoffman, Andrew J. (March 2021). Management as a Calling: Leading Business, Serving Society. Stanford University Press. ISBN 978-1-5036-2877-9. Winner of the 2022 PROSE Award in Business, Finance & Management and the 2022 Academy of Management Social Issues in Management Best Book Award. Finalist for the 2022 Academy of Management George R. Terry Book Award. Translated into Chinese.
- Hoffman, Andrew J. (March 2015). How Culture Shapes the Climate Change Debate. Stanford University Press. ISBN 978-0-8047-9422-0. Winner of the 2019 Responsible Research in Business Management Book Award. Translated into Czech.
- Ehrenfeld, John R.; Hoffman, Andrew J. (May 2013). Flourishing: A Frank Conversation About Sustainability. Stanford University Press. ISBN 978-0-8047-8415-3.
- Hoffman, Andrew J. (April 2010). Builder's Apprentice: A Memoir. Huron River Press. ISBN 978-1-932399-24-0. Joint winner of the 2011 Connecticut Book Award, memoir category.
- Hoffman, Andrew J. (November 2001). From Heresy to Dogma: An Institutional History of Corporate Environmentalism. Stanford University Press. ISBN 978-0-8047-4503-1. Winner of the 2001 Rachel Carson Prize, Society for the Social Studies of Science (4S).

=== Papers ===
Hoffman has published over a hundred articles and book chapters. Some notable ones include:

- Hoffman, Andrew J.; Jennings, P.D. (2021). "Institutional-Political Scenarios for Anthropocene Society". Business & Society. 60 (1): 57–94. doi:10.1177/0007650318816468.
- Elangovan, A.R.; Hoffman, Andrew J. (2019). "The Pursuit of Success in Academia: Plato's Ghost Asks 'What Then?'". Journal of Management Inquiry. 30 (1): 68–73. doi:10.1177/1056492619836729.
- Hoffman, Andrew J. (2018). "The Next Phase of Business Sustainability". Stanford Social Innovation Review. 16 (2): 34–39. doi:10.48558/1c0c-0n15.
- Wooten, Melissa; Hoffman, Andrew J. (2017). "Organizational Fields: Past, Present and Future". In R. Greenwood; C. Oliver; T. Lawrence; R. Meyer (eds.). The SAGE Handbook of Organizational Institutionalism (2nd ed.). Sage Publications. pp. 55–75. doi:10.4135/9781526415066.
- Hoffman, Andrew J. (2012). "Climate Science as Culture War". Stanford Social Innovation Review. 10 (4): 30–37. doi:10.48558/yy4t-y622.
- Hoffman, Andrew J.; Ocasio, William (2001). "Not All Events are Attended Equally: Toward a Middle-Range Theory of Industry Attention to External Events". Organization Science. 12 (4): 414–434. doi:10.1287/orsc.12.4.414.10639.
- Hoffman, Andrew J. (1999). "Institutional Evolution and Change: Environmentalism and the U.S. Chemical Industry". The Academy of Management Journal. 42 (4): 351–371. doi:10.5465/257008. hdl:2027.42/136182. ISSN 0001-4273. JSTOR 257008.
