= David Mark (disambiguation) =

David Mark may refer to:

- David Mark (born 1948), former President of the Senate of Nigeria and Senator for the Benue South constituency of Benue State
- David Mark (journalist) (born 1973), American journalist and author of two books on American politics
- David Mark (novelist), (born 1977), British novelist, police procedurals based in Scotland
- David Mark (scientist), (born 1947), University at Buffalo Professor of Geography
- David E. Mark (1923–2005), American diplomat
- pseudonym of Rudolf Zehetgruber (1926–2023), Austrian film director, producer, screenwriter, actor

== See also ==
- David Marks (disambiguation)
