= Hoaxes and legends of upstate New York =

Hoaxes and legends have played a significant role in the history of upstate New York. For example:

- The Cardiff Giant, buried and "discovered" in the Onondaga County hamlet of Cardiff, attracted such attention from the public, and from writers such as Mark Twain and L. Frank Baum that P. T. Barnum made a copy which toured the country with his circus.
- Champ is the name given to a reputed lake monster living in Lake Champlain. The village of Port Henry has erected a giant model of Champ and holds "Champ Day" on the first Saturday of every August.
- Eoörnis Pterovelox Gobiensis, a fictional bird.
- The three Fox sisters of Hydesville, in the Wayne County town of Arcadia, conducted the first table-rapping séances in the area. The fame of these seances helped to establish the 19th-century reputation of Central and Western New York as the "Burned-over district" as well as the American movement of Spiritualism (centered in Lily Dale) that taught communication with the dead.
- The Lake George Monster
- "Rip Van Winkle" (1819), a short story by Washington Irving, is set in the years before and after the American Revolutionary War in the Catskill Mountains.

== See also ==
- "The Legend of Sleepy Hollow" (1820), a short story by Washington Irving, is set circa 1790 in the Dutch settlement of Tarry Town, in a secluded glen called Sleepy Hollow, in the Lower Hudson Valley, in downstate New York. The protagonist, Ichabod Crane, is based on the schoolteacher, Jesse Merwin, who was befriended by Washington Irving during his months-long residence in Kinderhook.
