= David J. Marks =

David J. Marks is a woodworker based in Santa Rosa, California.

Marks studied art at Cabrillo College in Santa Cruz, California. In 1981, he opened a studio in Santa Rosa. During the 1980s, his focus was on creating one-of-a-kind furniture. Beginning in the 1990s, he shifted toward woodturning and sculpture.

He hosted the DIY Network's show Wood Works, which showcased a combination of techniques using both hand and power tools to design and build pieces that highlight the color and grain of exotic woods. He also incorporated metal and metal patination into his projects. Marks utilized a process called bent wood lamination, where multiple thin wooden slats are glued together and bent into a form to cure. Although he is a master woodturner, he primarily focused on furniture making in the show. Marks describes his style as expressing "a sense of time and mystery," drawing inspiration from a fusion of styles including ancient Egyptian, African, Art Nouveau, Art Deco, and Asian. He emphasizes the importance of attention to fine details in all his designs.

He often emphasized that attention to detail distinguishes fine furniture from mediocre pieces, such as matching wood grain at joints to create the appearance of a single, solid block.

The show ran for seven seasons and is no longer in production. As of 2007, Marks has been teaching private classes on various woodworking topics at his studio and during tours.

== Awards ==
- NICHE Awards Winner - Mixed and Miscellaneous Media ~ Philadelphia, PA 2001
- NICHE Awards Winner - Garden Art/Sculpture ~ Philadelphia, PA 2001
- Modern Masters, Home & Garden Television Network 2000
- Collaborators, with Ron Kent, an exhibit of one-of-a-kind pieces, del Mano Gallery ~ Los Angeles, CA 2000
- California Discovery Awards, Gold Award ~ Napa, CA 1994
- "Best in Show," Artistry in Wood ~ Sonoma County Woodworkers Association 1987, 1988, 1991
- "Best Craftsmanship," Artistry in Wood ~ Sonoma County Woodworkers Association 1987
- "Jurors Award of Excellence," Artistry in Wood ~ Sonoma County Woodworkers Association 1985
- "Guild Member Award" (Best Small Piece) ~ Sonoma County Woodworkers Association, Santa Rosa, CA 1983
- "Jurors Award of Excellence" ~ Mendocino Woodworkers Association, Mendocino, CA, 1983
