= David Mark (journalist) =

American journalist, author and political analyst (born 1973)

- Born: March 18, 1973 (age 53)
- Occupations: Journalist, author, political analyst
- Writing career
- Period: 1997–present
- Website: davidmark.org

David Mark (born March 18, 1973) is an American journalist, editor, author and political analyst. He serves as managing editor of the magazine division of the Washington Examiner. Over a career spanning more than three decades, Mark has worked as a reporter and editor for national and regional news organizations including the Associated Press, Congressional Quarterly, Campaigns & Elections, Politico, CNN Digital Politics, , and the Washington Examiner. He is also the author of books on American political campaigns and political language including "Going Dirty: The Art of Negative Campaigning (2006) and Dog Whistles, Walk-Backs and Washington Handshakes: Decoding the Jargon Slang and Bluster of American Political Speech. (2014).

== Early life and education ==
Mark earned his B.A from Brandeis University in 1995, majoring in politics, and his M.S. from the Columbia University Graduate School of Journalism, in 1997. He began his journalism career covering local government before joining the Associated Press and later relocating to Washington, D.C., where he specialized in national politics and Congress.

== Career ==
After working as a reporter for the Associated Press in Tallahassee, Florida, Mark joined Congressional Quarterly, where he covered the U.S. House of Representatives, congressional leadership, and national political campaigns. He subsequently became editor-in-chief of Campaigns & Elections magazine, overseeing reporting on political consulting, campaign strategy, and electoral trends.

In 2006, Mark joined Politico, where he spent approximately six years as a senior editor. During his tenure he edited political news coverage, opinion content, and election reporting while also serving as an on-air political analyst for television and radio outlets. Following his time at Politico, he became editor-in-chief of Politix, a Silicon Valley-based political news and discussion platform, before later serving as an editor at CNN Digital Politics during and after the 2016 United States presidential election.

In 2018, Mark joined the Washington Examiner as deputy news editor during the publication's editorial expansion. He later became a senior editor before being appointed managing editor of the Washington Examiner magazine. In that role he oversees editorial planning, assigns and edits political reporting and long-form features, and continues to write on congressional politics, elections, and public policy.

Throughout his career, Mark has reported extensively on American elections, congressional politics, presidential campaigns, political communication, and public policy. His work has combined reporting, editing, and political analysis across print, digital, broadcast, and magazine journalism.

=== Books ===
Mark is the author of Going Dirty: The Art of Negative Campaigning (2006), a study of negative campaigning in American elections that examines the historical development and strategic use of attack advertising and campaign messaging. The book has been updated through multiple editions reflecting changes in modern campaign practices.

He later co-authored Dog Whistles, Walk-Backs and Washington Handshakes: Decoding the Jargon, Slang and Bluster of American Political Speech (2014) with Chuck McCutcheon. The book examines the vocabulary, terminology, and rhetorical conventions commonly used in American political discourse and government. It received reviews in national publications including The Wall Street Journal.

=== Political analysis ===
Beyond his editorial responsibilities, Mark has frequently appeared as a political analyst on American television and radio discussing elections, Congress, presidential politics, and public affairs. He has been interviewed by national and international media during election cycles and has participated in discussions on campaign strategy, political communication, and government.

Mark has participated in international journalism and public diplomacy programmes in cooperation with the United States Department of State and European institutions. He has lectured and taken part in professional exchanges in about twenty countries across Europe, Africa, the Middle East, Asia, and Oceania, addressing journalism, media ethics, elections, democratic governance, and press freedom. In 2022, he participated in programmes with the Nigerian Guild of Editors on journalism and democratic institutions, and in 2024 he visited Botswana for U.S. Embassy-supported events on American political journalism and election coverage.

== Bibliography ==
- Mark, David (2006). Going Dirty: The Art of Negative Campaigning. Lanham, Md.: Rowman & Littlefield Publishers. ISBN 978-0-7425-9981-9.
- McCutcheon, Chuck; Mark, David (2014). Dog Whistles, Walk-Backs and Washington Handshakes: Decoding the Jargon Slang and Bluster of American Political Speech. ISBN 978-1611686036.
