= David Marks (preacher) =

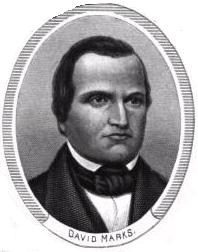
David Marks

David Marks (November 4, 1805 – December 1, 1845) was an American Baptist preacher.

He was born in Shandaken, Ulster County, New York. At age 13, he set out on foot for Providence, Rhode Island. He walked 368 miles (592 km) before arriving at Brown University. However, upon his arrival he was informed that tuition would be free, but no other funds were available for boarding or clothing. He then walked 368 miles (592 km) back home.

On June 11, 1819, he was baptized and became a member of the Freewill Baptist Church in Phelps. The following year he joined the Freewill Baptist Church in Junius.

At age 15, he felt the call of God leading him to enter the ministry. He left home and began preaching in what was known as the Holland Purchase. Large congregations would gather to hear his preaching. However, during his first 3 months absence from home, his mother died and his father's house was burned.

== See also ==
- Free Will Baptist
- Arminianism
