= David H. Marks =

American engineer

David H. Marks is an American engineer, focusing in sustainable development, currently the Goulder Professor of Civil and Environmental Engineering and Engineering Systems, Emeritus at Massachusetts Institute of Technology.
