= Ackerman (surname) =

Acker comes from German or Old English, meaning "ploughed field"; it is related to or an alternate spelling of the word acre. Therefore, Ackerman means "ploughman". Ackerman is also a common Ashkenazi Jewish surname of Yiddish origin with the same meaning. The Ashkenazi surname Ackerman sometimes refers to the town of Akkerman in Bessarabia, south-west of Odessa.

== Academics ==
- A. Bernard Ackerman (1936–2008), American physician and dermatologist
- Bernice Ackerman (1925–1995), American meteorologist
- Edward Augustus Ackerman (1911–1973), American geographer
- Frank Ackerman (1946–2019), American economist
- Lauren Ackerman (1905–1993), American physician & pathologist
- Maya Ackerman, Russian-American computer scientist
- Nathan Ackerman (1908–1971), American psychiatrist and family therapist
- Nate Ackerman (born 1978), British-American logician and wrestler

== Broadcasters ==
- Brady Ackerman, American sports commentator
- Craig Ackerman (born c. 1975), radio play-by-play announcer
- Dan Ackerman (born 1974), radio deejay and journalist
- Ken Ackerman, American television news anchor
- Ken Ackerman (radio announcer) (1922–2017), American radio announcer, disc jockey, and news anchor.

== Businesspeople ==
- F. Duane Ackerman (born 1942), American businessman
- Martin S. Ackerman (1932–1993), American lawyer and businessman
- Peter Ackerman (1946–2022), British businessman
- Raymond Ackerman (1931–2023), South African businessman
- Roy Ackerman (1942–2017), English restaurateur

== Clergy ==
- Keith Ackerman (born 1946), American bishop
- Paula Ackerman (1893–1989), first American female rabbi
- Richard Henry Ackerman (1903–1992), American bishop

== Film and television production ==
- Andy Ackerman (born c. 1956), American director and producer
- Harry Ackerman (1912–1991), American television producer
- Ralph Ackerman (1941–2008), photographer and independent filmmaker
- Raymond Ackerman, American filmmaker
- Thomas E. Ackerman (born 1948), American cinematographer

== Performers ==
- Bettye Ackerman (1924–2006), American actress
- Chad Ackerman (born 1983), American rock singer-songwriter, musician, writer and artist
- Leslie Ackerman (born 1956), American actress
- Loni Ackerman (born 1949), American musical theatre actress
- Malin Åkerman (born 1978), Swedish-American actress, model and singer
- Shelley Ackerman (1953–2020), American astrologer and actress
- Tracy Ackerman, British singer and songwriter
- William Ackerman (born 1949), American guitarist, composer, and founder of Windham Hill Records
- Willie Ackerman (1939–2012), American drummer

== Photographers ==
- Simon Ackerman, British fashion photographer
- George W. Ackerman (1884–1962), American photographer
- Gordon Ackerman, American journalist and photographer
- Richard Ackerman, American natural and landscape photographer

== Politicians ==
- Annie Ackerman (1914–1989), American political activist
- Dick Ackerman (born 1942), American politician
- Ernest Robinson Ackerman (1863–1931), American politician
- Frans Ackerman (c. 1330–1387), Flemish statesman
- Gary Ackerman (born 1942), American politician
- Jay Ackerman (1933–2007), American farmer and politician
- José Chlimper Ackerman (born 1955), Peruvian banker and politician
- Mia Ackerman (born 1965), American politician

== Sportspeople ==
- Alf Ackerman (1929–1988), South African footballer
- Don Ackerman (1930–2011), American basketball player
- Graham Ackerman (born 1983), American gymnast
- H. D. Ackerman (born 1973), South African cricketer
- Hylton Ackerman (1947–2009), South African cricketer
- Marques Ackerman (born 1996), South African first-class cricketer
- Rick Ackerman (born 1959), American football player
- T. J. Ackerman (born 1975), former Canadian football offensive tackle
- Tom Ackerman (born 1972), American football player
- Tom Ackerman (basketball), American basketball player and coach
- Tony Ackerman (born 1984), English former professional footballer
- Travis Ackerman (born 1999), South African cricketer
- Tusten Ackerman (1901–1997), American basketball player
- Val Ackerman (born 1959), American attorney, sports executive, and basketball player

== Writers ==
- Andrea Ackerman, American artist, theorist and writer
- Blaster Al Ackerman (1939–2013), American mail artist and writer
- Carl W. Ackerman (1890–1970), American journalist and author
- Caroline Iverson Ackerman (1918–2012), American aviator, journalist, reporter and educator
- Diane Ackerman (born 1948), American author, poet, and naturalist
- Elliot Ackerman (born 1980), American author
- Felicia Nimue Ackerman (born 1947), American author, poet, and philosopher
- Forrest J Ackerman (1916–2008), American science fiction writer and editor
- Jennifer Ackerman (born 1959), American nature writer
- Joanne Leedom-Ackerman (born 1947), American novelist, short story writer and journalist
- Karen Ackerman (born 1951), American children's author
- Marianne Ackerman (born 1952), Canadian playwright, novelist, and journalist
- Peter Ackerman (playwright), American playwright, actor, and screenwriter

== Others ==
- Arlene Ackerman (1947–2013), American educator
- Bruce Ackerman (born 1943), American law professor
- Harold A. Ackerman (1928–2009), United States federal judge
- James Ackerman (disambiguation)
- Jerome and Evelyn Ackerman, American designers
- John Ackerman (disambiguation)
- John William Ackerman (1825–1905), South African knight
- Paul Ackerman (1908–1977), American music journalist
- Robert Ackerman (disambiguation)
- Sherry L. Ackerman, American academic and dressage clinician
- Spencer Ackerman, American reporter and blogger
- Susan Ackerman (disambiguation)

== Characters ==
- Howard T. Ackerman, from Command & Conquer: Red Alert 3
- Kenny Ackerman, from Attack on Titan
- Levi Ackerman, from Attack on Titan
- Mikasa Ackerman, from Attack on Titan
- Suzie J. Ackerman, from The Amazing Digital Circus
