= Timeline of Pietermaritzburg =

The following is a timeline of the history of Pietermaritzburg. It is part of the Msunduzi Local Municipality in the Umgungundlovu District Municipality, KwaZulu-Natal province, South Africa.

== 19th century ==
- 1839
  - Pietermaritzburg founded by Voortrekkers; named after Gerrit Maritz and Piet Retief.
  - October: Settlement becomes capital of the newly formed Natalia Republic.
- 1840 - Voortrekker Church of the Vow consecrated.
- 1843
  - British Fort Napier established.
  - Natalier newspaper begins publication.
  - Settlement becomes capital of the newly formed British Colony of Natal.
- 1846
  - Natal Witness newspaper begins publication.
  - Book Society founded.
- 1847 - Natal Independent newspaper begins publication.
- 1851
  - Natal and East African Society and Agricultural Society founded.
  - In vicinity of Pietermaritzburg, development of Edendale begins.
- 1856
  - Pietermaritzburg incorporated as a borough.
  - D. D. Buchanan becomes mayor.
  - Pietermaritzburg officials issue "ordinance permitting the establishment of African locations" (i.e. racial segregation).
- 1862 - Prison built on Burger Street.
- 1863 - Mr. William Calder opens High School Maritzburg, later to become Maritzburg College, or, simply "College."
- 1868
  - William Macrorie becomes bishop of Anglican diocese of Maritzburg.
  - St Saviour's Cathedral, Pietermaritzburg opened.
- 1874 - Botanical Garden established.
- 1878 - February: Natal Society Museum opens.
- 1879 - Pietermaritzburg County Football Club formed.
- 1880 - Durban-Pietermaritzburg railway begins operating.
- 1885 - Pietermaritzburg Chamber of Commerce active (approximate date).
- 1888 - Alexandra Park established.
- 1893 - 7 June: Civil rights activist Gandhi removed from train in Pietermaritzburg for defying racial segregation law.
- 1897 - St. John's Diocesan School for Girls founded.

== 20th century ==
- 1901 - Town Hall rebuilt.
- 1904
  - Electric tram begins operating.
  - Natal Government Museum active.
  - Population: 31,119.
- 1910
  - Natal University College founded.
  - Pietermaritzburg becomes part of the newly formed Union of South Africa (British dominion).
- 1911 - Population: 30,555.
- 1912 - Voortrekker museum founded.
- 1919 - Fort Napier becomes a hospital.
- 1920 - Pietermaritzburg Girls' High School founded.
- 1921 - Comrades Marathon (Durban-Pietermaritzburg) begins.
- 1924 - Beer hall in business on Pietermaritz Street.
- 1925 - Shuter & Shooter Publishers in business.
- 1927 - Afrikaansmediumskool (school) established.
- 1929 - "Native Village at Sobantu" built.
- 1931 - Natal Bantu Football Association formed.
- 1934 - Nux student newspaper begins publication.
- 1944 - Pietermaritzburg Italian P.O.W. Church built on Epworth Road.
- 1948 - Alexandra Park Street Circuit (motor race track) opens.
- 1951 - Dusi Canoe Marathon to Durban begins.
- 1953 - Roy Hesketh Circuit (motor race track) opens.
- 1954 - Edendale Hospital founded.
- 1960 - Alexandra High School for white boys opens.
- 1961 - Pietermaritzburg becomes part of the newly independent Republic of South Africa.
- 1962 - Statue of Piet Retief unveiled.
- 1972 - 6 April: "In the Natal Supreme Court in Pietermaritzburg, at the end of the longest trial of its kind in South Africa, thirteen defendants...are sentenced...for contravening the Terrorism Act."
- 1979 - Maritzburg United F.C. (football club) formed.
- 1976 - St Saviour's Cathedral, Pietermaritzburg deconsecrated and demolished in 1981.
- 1981 - Anglican Cathedral of the Holy Nativity consecrated.
- 1985 - 5 August: Treason trial begins.
- 1987 - September: Flood.
- 1989 - Napierville prison begins operating.
- 1990 - March: "Seven Day War" occurs.
- 1991 - Population: 156,473 city; 228,549 metro.
- 1993
  - April: Unrest.
  - 6 June: Gandhi memorial unveiled.
- 1996 - Children in Distress Network (CINDI) organized.
- 2000
  - Pietermaritzburg becomes part of the newly formed Msunduzi Local Municipality (which includes Edendale, Imbali, etc.).
  - Hloni Glenford Zondi becomes mayor.

== 21st century ==
- 2001 - Population: 223,519.
- 2002 - Pietermaritzburg Chamber of Business formed.
- 2004 - University of Natal becomes University of KwaZulu-Natal.
- 2005 - Website Msunduzi.gov.za launched (approximate date).
- 2006 - Zanele Hlatshwayo becomes mayor of Msunduzi.
- 2010 - May: Mike Tarr becomes mayor of Msunduzi.
- 2011 - Chris Ndlela becomes mayor of Msunduzi.
- 2013 - Spring Grove Dam at Mooi River begins operating in vicinity of city.
- 2016 - Themba Njilo becomes mayor of Msunduzi.
- 2021 - 2021 Pietermaritzburg power outage
- 2022 - 2022 Pietermaritzburg shooting

== See also ==
- Pietermaritzburg history
- List of mayors of Pietermaritzburg
- List of heritage sites in Pietermaritzburg
- List of governors of Natal (British colony), headquartered in Pietermaritzburg 1843–1910
- Timelines of other cities in South Africa: Cape Town, Durban, Gqeberha, Johannesburg, Pretoria

== Bibliography ==
- "Commercial Directory, Pietermaritzburg", Natal Almanac and Yearly Register: 1868, Pietermaritzburg: P. Davis & Sons, 1867
- "Principal Towns in Natal: Pietermaritzburg", Natal Almanac Directory and Yearly Register, Pietermaritzburg: P. Davis & Sons, 1897 + Street Directory
- J. Forsyth Ingram (1898). Story of an African City. Pietermaritzburg: C. Coester. (About Pietermaritzburg, with illustrations)
- C.W. Francis Harrison, ed. (1903). "City of Pietermaritzburg". Natal: An Illustrated Official Railway Guide and Handbook of General Information. London: Payne Jennings. pp. 51–63. OCLC 8287214.
- "Pietermaritzburg". Twentieth Century Impressions of Natal: Its People, Commerce, Industries, and Resources. Twentieth Century Impressions. Natal: Lloyd's Greater Britain Publishing Company. 1906.
- "Pietermaritzburg" . Encyclopædia Britannica. Vol. 21 (11th ed.). 1910. p. 592.
- Alan F. Hattersley (1938). Pietermaritzburg Panorama: A Survey of One Hundred Years of an African City. Pietermaritzburg: Shuter & Shooter. OCLC 652246540.
- Alan F. Hattersley (1940). Portrait of a Colony: The Story of Natal. Cambridge University Press. OCLC 776806583.
- Alan F. Hattersley (1951). Portrait of a City. Shuter & Shooter. OCLC 776806581. (About Pietermaritzburg)
- John Laband and Robert Haswell, ed. (1988). Pietermaritzburg 1838-1988: a new portrait of an African city. Pietermaritzburg.
- Matthew Kentridge. An Unofficial War: Inside the Conflict in Pietermaritzburg (Cape Town: David Philip 1990)
- T M Wills (1991). "Pietermaritzburg". In Anthony Lemon (ed.). Homes Apart: South Africa's Segregated Cities. Indiana University Press. ISBN 0-253-33321-0.
- Dominy, Graham (1 October 1992). "An emblem of peace and security': The construction of Fort Napier and its impact on Pietermaritzburg, 1843-1848". Southern African Humanities. 4 (10): 89–106. hdl:10520/AJA16815564_343.
- Bolsmann, Chris (2014). "Sport and Post-Apartheid South Africa: Revisiting The Race Game". Journal of Sport History. 41 (2): 331–338. doi:10.5406/jsporthistory.41.2.331. JSTOR 10.5406/jsporthistory.41.2.331. S2CID 160428518.
- Thompson, P. S. (1 November 2014). "Pietermaritzburg in the Great War : corporate patriotism and civic sacrifice". Historia. 59 (2): 171–193. hdl:10520/EJC163424.
- Whelan, Debbie (2015). "eMatsheni: The central beer hall as social and municipal infrastructure in twentieth century Pietermaritzburg". Historia. 60 (1): 75–91. doi:10.17159/2309-8392/2015/v60n1a5. hdl:10321/2338.
