= City of Westminster Cemetery, Hanwell =

Cemetery in Hanwell, West London, England

City of Westminster (Hanwell) Cemetery
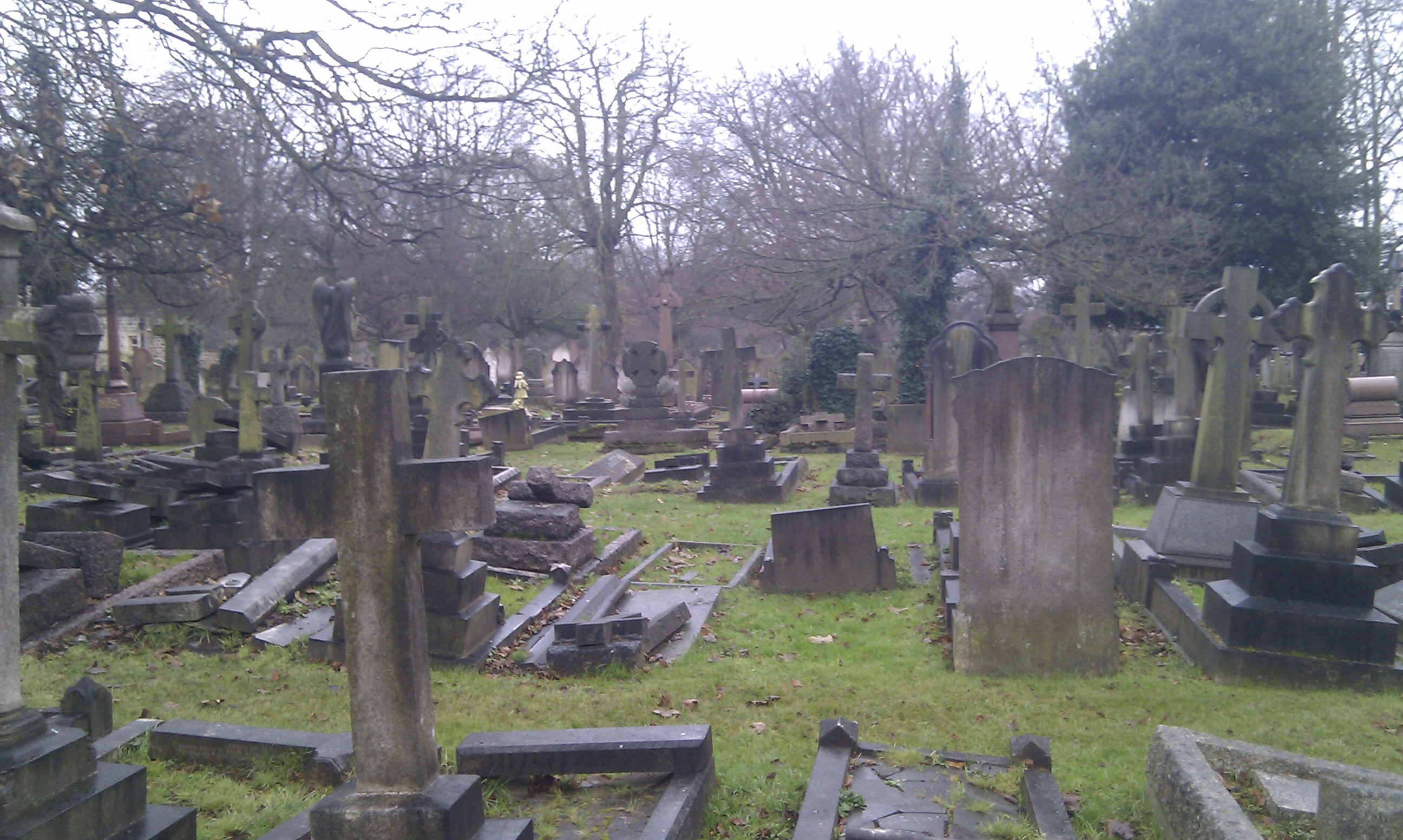
- City of Westminster (Hanwell) Cemetery in December 2010
- Interactive map of City of Westminster (Hanwell) Cemetery

Details
- Established: 1853
- Location: 31 Uxbridge Road, Hanwell, Ealing, west London
- Country: England
- Coordinates: 51°30′28″N 0°19′54″W
- Type: Public
- Owned by: City of Westminster
- Size: 23 acres (9.3 ha)
- No. of graves: 16,000 graves 100,000 interments
- Website: Hanwell Cemetery

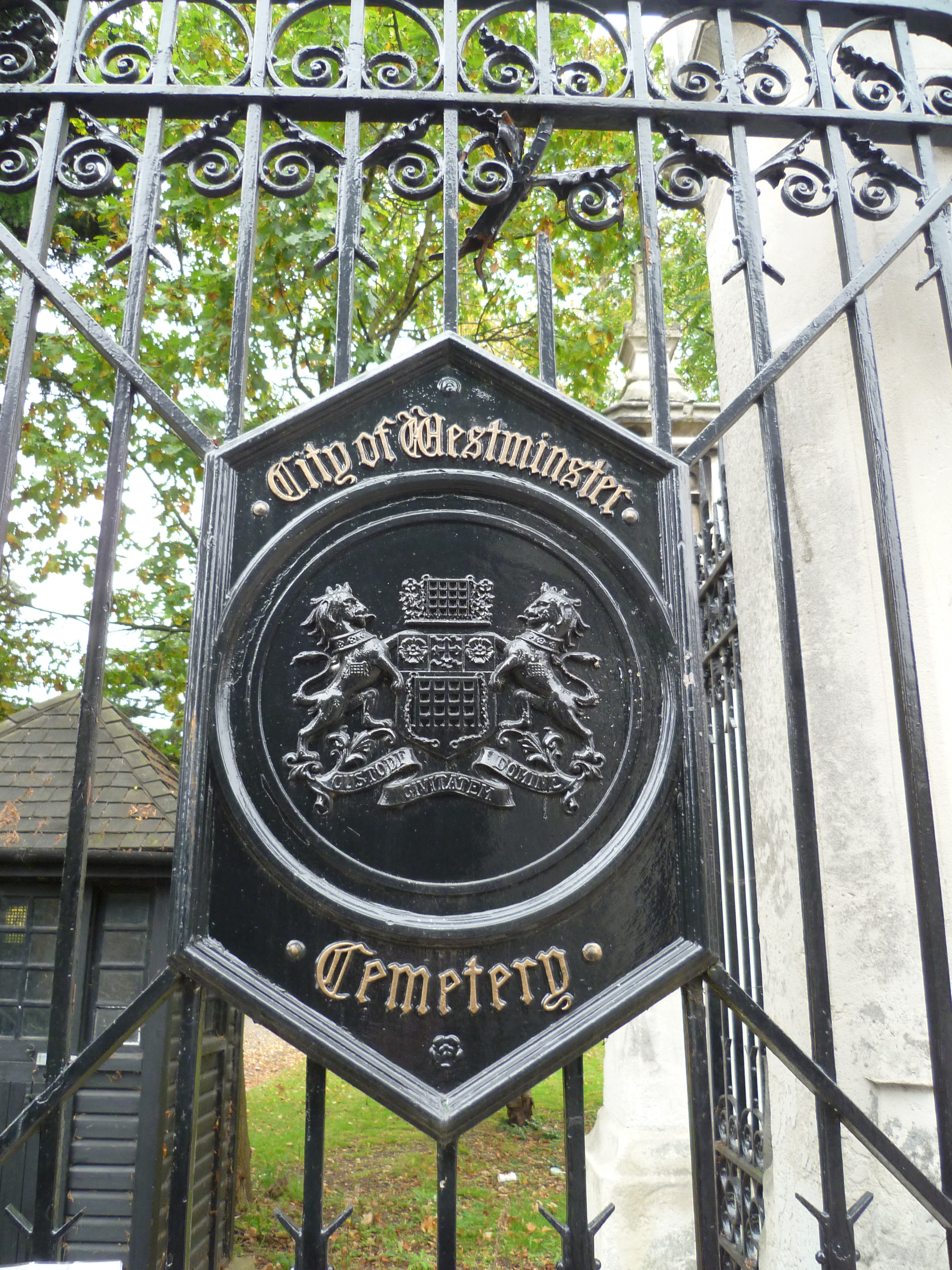
Emblem of the cemetery.

City of Westminster (Hanwell) Cemetery is a cemetery located in Hanwell, Ealing, West London. It is owned and managed by the City of Westminster's Parks Service.

== History ==
By the 1840s, the existing churchyards and cemeteries of London were full and almost overflowing. The Bayswater Road Cemetery and St Mark's, North Audley Street were under the control of the St. George's Hanover Square Burial Board, who were unable to find a solution until the Metropolitan Interments Act 1850 became law.

In 1853, the board purchased 12 acres (4.9 ha) in Hanwell for their exclusive use. Robert Jerrard was appointed as architect, who designed the church and administration buildings in a Victorian Gothic revival architecture style. Consecrated on 6 July 1854, by the Bishop of London Charles Blomfield, the total cost of cemetery and buildings was £14,741 17s 11d. The first interment took place on 2 August 1854.

In 1883, and additional 11 acres (4.5 ha) were purchased, making a total size of today of 23 acres (9.3 ha). In 1889, the cemetery was transferred to the Metropolitan Borough of the City of Westminster. The cemetery suffered extensive damage during World War Two, and at the end of the war in Europe a gift was given to the cemetery in the form of the renewal of the chapel's south side stained glass window, depicting a miscellany of some 30 biblical emblems.

In 1965, the cemetery came under new management in light of local government reorganisation. In 1987, the cemetery was one of three that Shirley Porter's Westminster City Council controversially sold to land developers for 15p. However, like East Finchley and Mill Hill, it was reacquired by the new City of Westminster in 1990, and renamed at that point as their Hanwell Cemetery. The council undertook extensive restoration of the central buildings in 1994, and in 2001 replaced the entire roof and cleaned the exterior walls, as well as making all provisions required under the Disability Discrimination Act.

== War graves ==
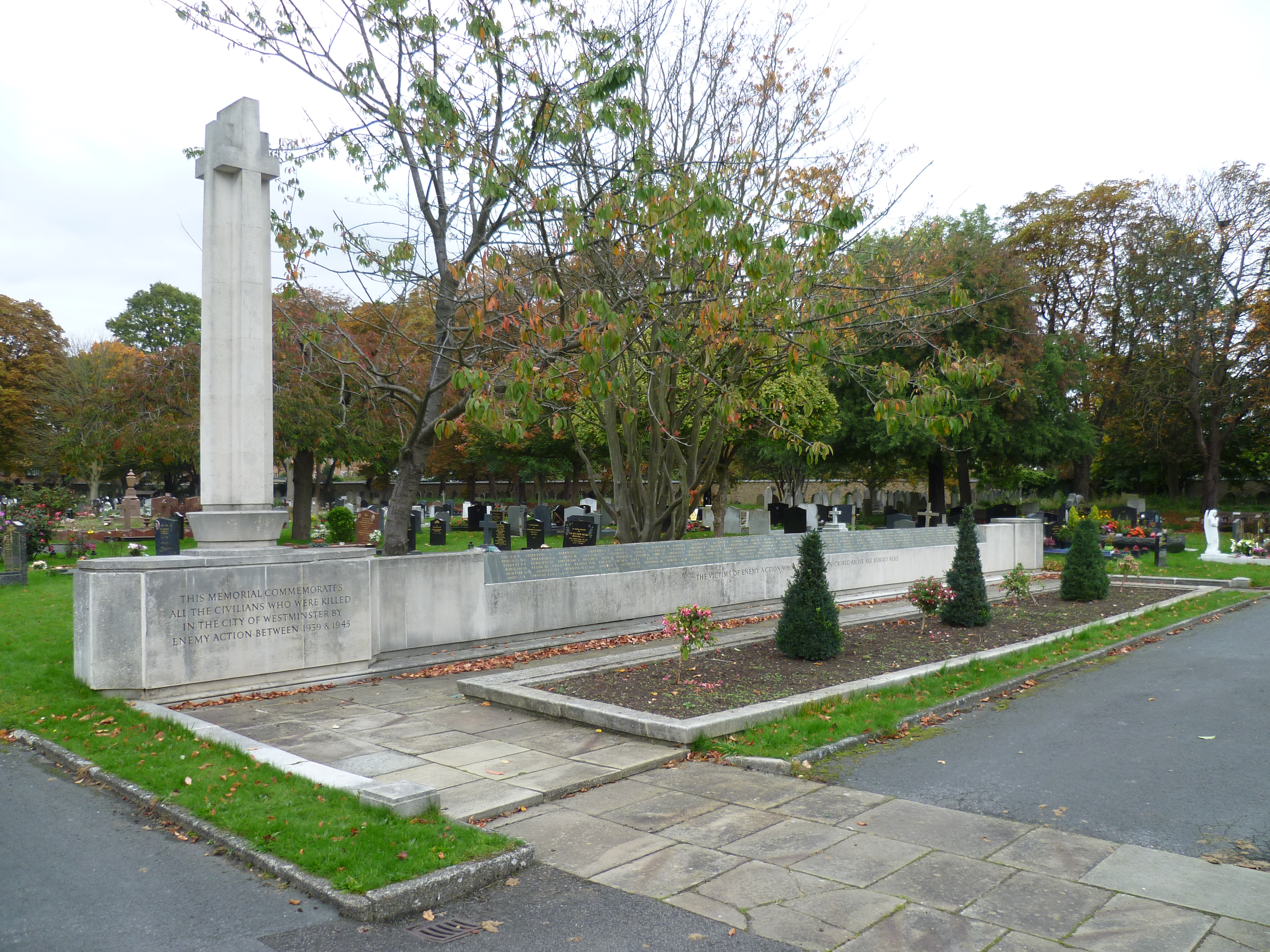
The memorial to the City of Westminster civilians killed during the Second World War.

There are 84 graves administered by the Commonwealth War Graves Commission – 55 from World War I and 29 from World War II – located throughout the cemetery. There is also a Royal British Legion memorial cross in the centre of the cemetery.

A number of people killed during World War II in air raids were buried temporarily during the conflict, and then reburied afterwards. 200 residents of the City of Westminster are remembered on the civilian memorial, located near the centre of the grounds. Unveiled in 1950, it houses the grave of popular singer Al Bowlly, who was killed at his flat in Jermyn Street during an air raid on 17 April 1941.

== Transport links ==
The cemetery is well connected to London's transport network, with buses E3, E8, 83 and 207 stopping outside. The nearest London Underground stations are Ealing Broadway, Acton Town and Boston Manor. Elizabeth line services stop at Hanwell station, offering services to Heathrow Airport and Reading, and to Abbey Wood and Shenfield via London Paddington.

== Notable interments ==
- Violet Bland (1863–1940), English Suffragette
- Kate Reily (1846-1908), English Court Dressmaker
- Al Bowlly, singer. Killed in The Blitz, buried in the mass grave in the centre of the grounds
- Marta Cunningham CBE, American soprano singer and philanthropist, founder of the Not Forgotten Association.
- Freddie Frinton, comedian
- Sir John Ackerman K.C.M.G, Mayor of Pietermaritzsburg
- Dr Robert Mortimer Glover, chloroform pioneer (unmarked grave)
- Ian Nairn, architectural critic and broadcaster
- Richard Bullen Newton, Paleontologist at the British Museum
- Col. Sir David Semple, First Director of Research India. Founder of the Pasteur Institute at Kasauli India.
- Sir John Hunt O.B.E, First Town Clerk of the City of Westminster
- The Rev Andrew Charles Albert McLaglen, son Fred Charles McLaglen and wife Lillian Marian McLaglen all relatives of 1935 Oscar winner Victor McLaglen.

== See also ==
- Westminster cemeteries scandal
