= RMS Nova Scotia (1926) =

Sunken ship from the UK

Coordinates: 28.30°S 33.00°E

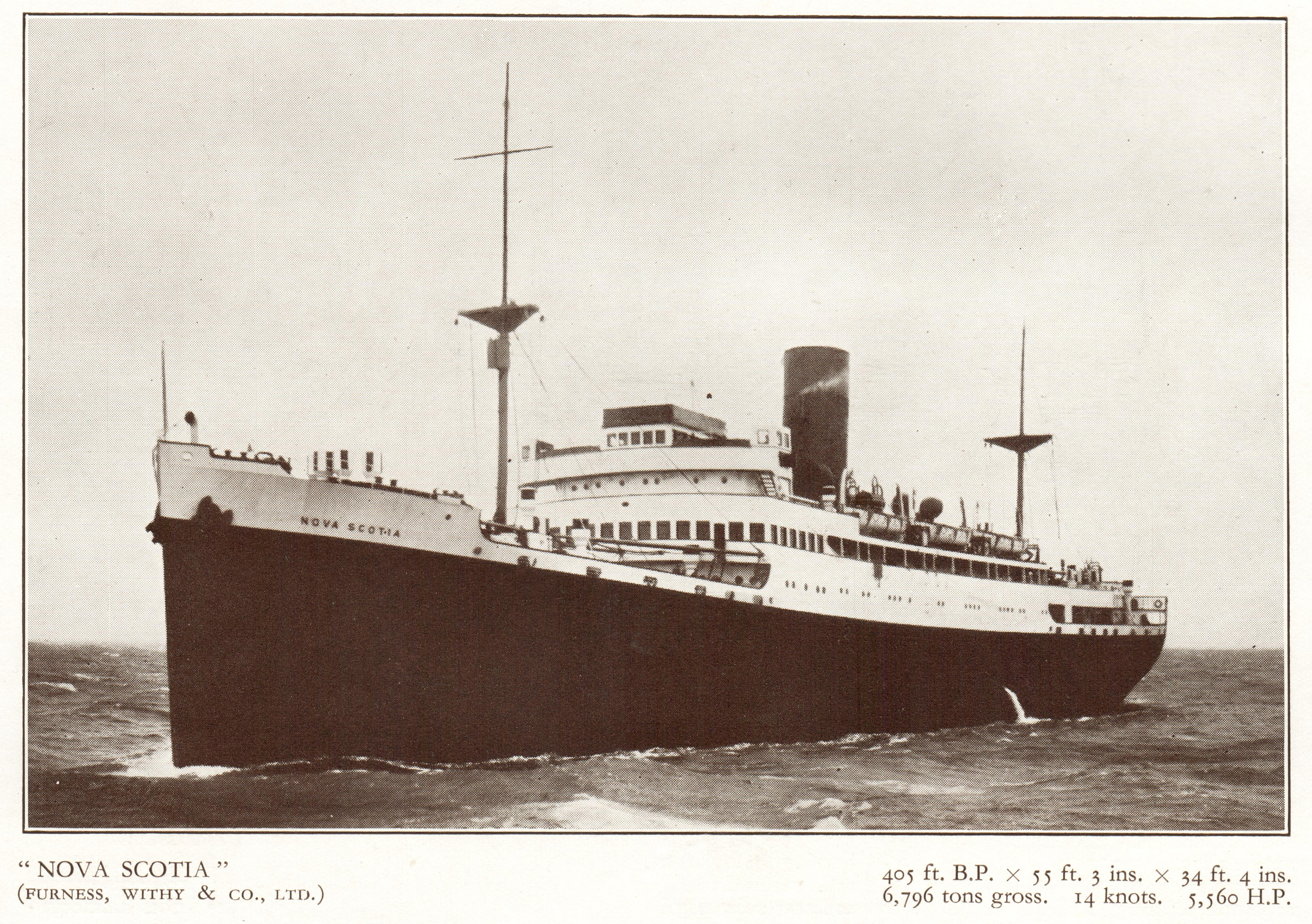
- RMS Nova Scotia

History

United Kingdom
- Namesake: Nova Scotia, Canada
- Owner: Johnston Warren Lines (1926–41) Ministry of War Transport (1941–42)
- Operator: Furness, Withy & Co
- Port of registry: (United Kingdom) Liverpool
- Route: Liverpool – St John's, Newfoundland – Halifax, Nova Scotia – Boston, MA (1926–41)
- Builder: Vickers, Sons & Maxim, Ltd
- Yard number: 623
- Launched: May 1926
- Out of service: 28 November 1942
- Identification: UK official number 147363; code letters KTWQ (until 1933); Call sign GJFY (from 1934)
- Fate: Sunk, 28 November 1942

General characteristics
- Type: Passenger ship; Troop ship
- Tonnage: 6,796 GRT; 3,841 NRT
- Length: 406.1 ft (123.8 m) p/p
- Beam: 55.4 ft (16.9 m)
- Draught: 34 ft 4 in (10.46 m)
- Depth: 31.8 ft (9.7 m)
- Installed power: 1,047 NHP
- Propulsion: quadruple expansion steam engine
- Speed: 15 knots (28 km/h)
- Crew: 113 (1942)
- Notes: sister ship: RMS Newfoundland

RMS Nova Scotia was a 6,796 GRT UK transatlantic ocean liner and Royal Mail Ship. In World War II she was requisitioned as a troopship. In 1942 a German submarine sank her in the Indian Ocean with the loss of 858 of the 1,052 people aboard because of the attack of many whitetip sharks.

== Building ==
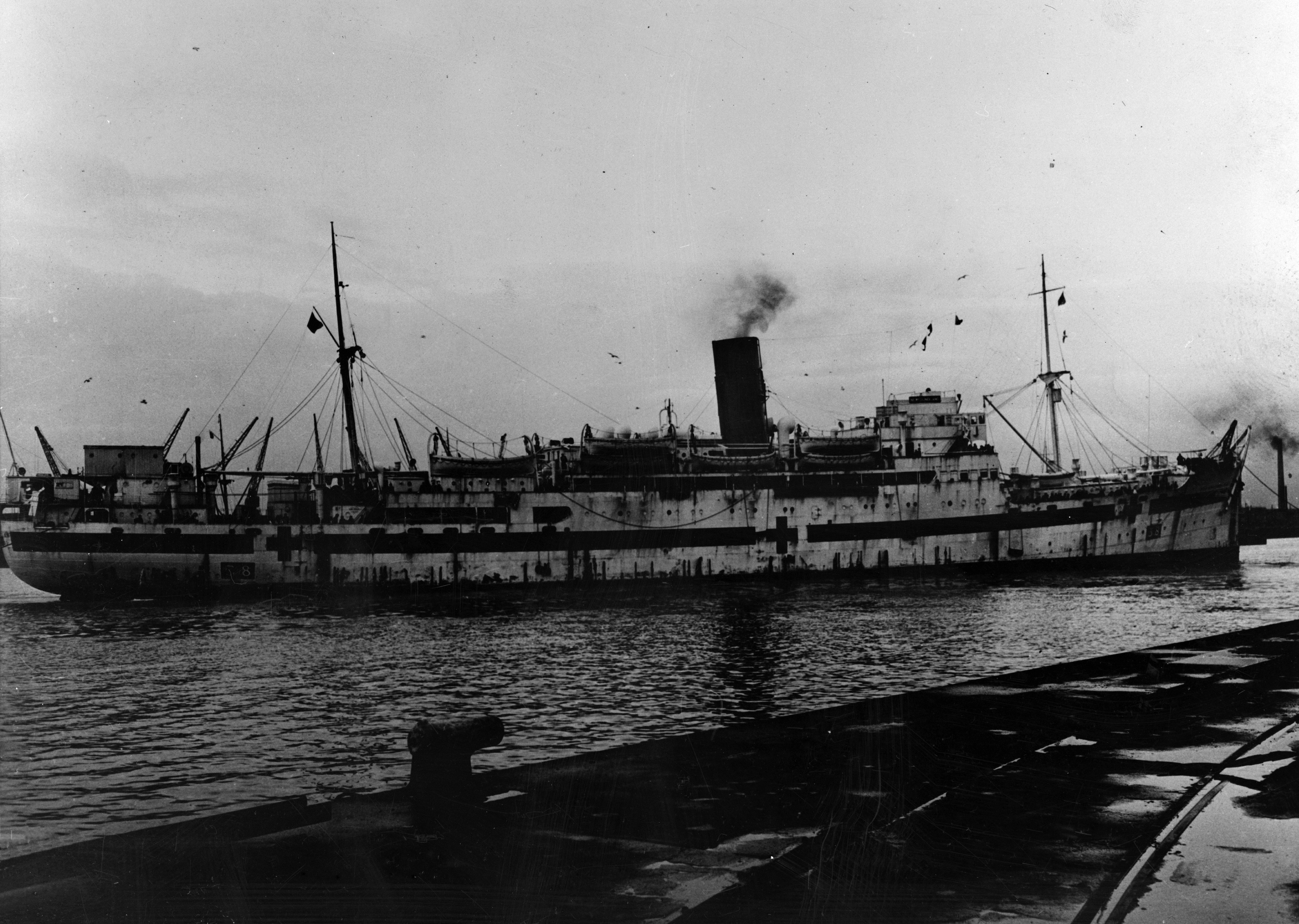
Sister ship Newfoundland as a hospital ship in the Second World War

Vickers, Sons & Maxim, Ltd of Barrow-in-Furness built Nova Scotia for Furness, Withy & Co of Liverpool. She was the sister ship of RMS Newfoundland, which Vickers had launched for the same owner 11 months previously.

Nova Scotia's 1,047 NHP quadruple expansion steam engine was fed by five 215 lb_{f}/in^{2} single-ended boilers with a total heating surface of 16,095 square feet (1,495 m^{2}). Her boilers were heated by 20 oil-fuelled corrugated furnaces with a grate surface of 377 square feet (35 m^{2}). Her boat deck had six lifeboats, mounted on Welin-Maclachlan davits.

== Civilian service ==
Nova Scotia joined Newfoundland on Furness, Withy's regular transatlantic mail route between Liverpool and Boston via St John's, Newfoundland and Halifax, Nova Scotia. Passengers included Roald Dahl, then aged 17, who in August 1934 was one of 50 public school boys who sailed from Liverpool on an expedition to Newfoundland of the recently founded Public Schools Exploring Society. Their passage to St John's took a week.

After the UK entered World War II in September 1939, the ship at first remained in civilian service. On 21 September 1940 she sailed from Liverpool bound for Canada, carrying passengers including the final 29 children to leave Britain under the Children's Overseas Reception Board (CORB) evacuation scheme. The CORB scheme was then discontinued because of the great loss of life when German submarine U-48 sank Ellerman Lines' City of Benares on 17 September.

== Troop ship ==
Position of Nova Scotia's wreck off the coast of Natal

Early in 1941 the Ministry of War Transport requisitioned Nova Scotia as a troop ship, and on 3 February she embarked 1,200 troops. She joined a convoy from Britain to Freetown, Sierra Leone, where she arrived on 2 March. Nova Scotia continued south, crossing the Equator on 12 March and reaching Cape Town, South Africa, on 22 March.

In the autumn of 1942 Nova Scotia left Port Tewfik in Egypt and sailed down the Red Sea to Massawa in British-occupied Eritrea, where she put US troops ashore and embarked Italian prisoners of war. She also called at the British Colony of Aden and then proceeded southwards unescorted, carrying over 750 Italian prisoners of war and civilian internees and 3,000 bags of mail bound for Durban, South Africa.

Nova Scotia had passed through the Mozambique Channel and was off the coast of Natal Province, South Africa, when at 7:15 on the morning of 28 November the German submarine U-177 hit her with three torpedoes. Nova Scotia rolled to port, caught fire and sank by the bow within 10 minutes. The crew managed to launch only one lifeboat; other survivors depended on life rafts or pieces of wreckage. Those who were left in the water either drowned or were killed by sharks.

In order to identify which ship it had just sunk, U-177 recovered two survivors. They were interned Italian merchant sailors who explained that most of those aboard had been Italian internees. Because of the Laconia Order that Admiral Dönitz had issued two months previously, the submarine's commander, Robert Gysae, withdrew U-177 from the area and radioed the Befehlshaber der U-Boote (BdU) for orders. The BdU ordered him to leave survivors in the water and continue on patrol. The BdU requested help from Portugal, which sent the frigate NRP Afonso de Albuquerque from Lourenço Marques in neighbouring Mozambique.

Afonso de Albuquerque reached the area on 29 November. Five survivors fired a distress flare and were rescued by the frigate. The next day Afonso de Albuquerque found herself surrounded by hundreds of floating corpses. The frigate rescued 130 Italian internees, 42 guards, 17 crew members, three military and naval personnel, one DEMS gunner and one passenger. 858 people died: 650 Italian internees, 96 crew members, 88 South African guards, 10 DEMS gunners, eight military and naval personnel, five passengers, and Nova Scotia's master. Two further survivors reached safety. One was rescued on the third day after the attack; the other was an Italian who drifted on a liferaft for a fortnight until he came ashore at Mtunzini in Natal.

== Monuments ==
Many corpses were washed ashore in Natal. The bodies of 120 Italian prisoners of war and internees were buried in a mass grave in the Hillary suburb of Durban, forming the nucleus of what there became the Italian Military Cemetery. In 1982 a substantial monument was erected on the grave.

In 2008, the bodies were transferred to the Pietermaritzburg Italian P.O.W. Church cemetery.

Nova Scotia's Italian dead are commemorated also in a monument at the Italian church at Adi Quala, Eritrea.

== See also ==
- Arandora Star — torpedoed in July 1940 while carrying interned Italian civilians
- Shuntien — torpedoed in December 1941 while carrying Italian prisoners of war

== Sources and further reading ==
- Bezuidenhout, Leon (March 2008). Pieter Snyman, Springbok–soldier 1940–43 (PDF). translated from Afrikaans by JC Hough & MJ Conradie. pp. 11–15.
- Burrell, David (1992). Furness Withy, 1891–1991. Kendal: World Ship Society. ISBN 0905617703.
- Haws, Duncan (2000). Furness Withy. Merchant Fleets. Vol. 37. Crowborough: Travel Creatours Ltd. ISBN 094637838X.
- Isacchini, Valeria (2008). L'Onda Gridava Forte (in Italian). Rome: Ugo Mursia Editore. ISBN 978-88-425-3949-0.
- Mann, Jessica (2005). Out of Harm's Way; The Wartime Evacuation of Children from Britain. London: Headline Publishing Group. pp. 130–131. ISBN 0-7553-1138-8.
- Mascellari, Tullio. 28 Novembre 1942 una Tragedia in Mare (in Italian). Archived from the original on 4 March 2016.
- Sturrock, Donald (2010). Storyteller: The Authorised Biography of Roald Dahl. London: HarperPress. pp. 93–94. ISBN 978-0007254767.
