= John Ackerman =

John Ackerman may refer to:

- John B. Ackerman (1909–1981), Vice Director of the National Security Agency and United States Air Force officer
- John M. Ackerman (born 1973), Mexican professor and writer
- John William Ackerman (1825–1905), mayor of Pietermaritzsburg
- John Yonge Akerman (1806–1873), English antiquarian and numismatist

== See also ==
- Ackerman (surname)
