= Caroline Birley =

British geologist and writer (1851–1907)

- Born: Caroline Birley; 16 November 1851; York Place, Oxford Road, Chorlton-on-Medlock, England
- Died: 15 February 1907 (aged 55); Pendleton, Greater Manchester, England
- Resting place: Lingfield Church, Surrey, England
- Occupations: Geologist and children's writer
- Notable work: We are Seven; Jessamine and her Lesson Books
- Relatives: Francis Birley (brother)

Caroline Birley (16 November 1851 – 15 February 1907) was an English geologist, fossil collector and children's author. As a geologist, she was noteworthy, not so much for the scientific value of her collection, but for the regard with which she was held in a predominately male profession. Her interest in geology started with stones she collected as a child and her enthusiasm continued until her death.

== Family and early life ==
She was born at York Place, Oxford Road in the Chorlton-on-Medlock area of Manchester, the fourth and last child of Thomas Hornby Birley J.P. (1815–1885) and Anne Leatham (1820–1866).

Her brother, Francis, was an amateur footballer who won the FA Cup three times in the 1870s and made two appearances for England. Her uncle was Hugh Birley, who was a Conservative Member of Parliament for Manchester from 1868 to 1883.

In 1857, she moved with her family from York Place to Highfield in Heaton Mersey and then, in 1864, to Hart Hill Mansion, Pendleton, and again to 4 Seedley Terrace in 1884.

== Career as a geologist ==
As a child, Birley developed an interest in geology and on her family holidays on the Isle of Man she would collect stones showing unusual peculiarities. At the age of 12, she became a subscriber to the Geological Magazine in its first year of publication in 1864. At first, she paid for her subscription from her own pocket before her grandmother made her an allowance to cover the cost.

In 1884, she moved from Hart Hill Mansion to nearby Seedley Terrace. Before long, her collection had outgrown her home so she erected an iron building in her garden, which she named the "Seedley Museum"; the museum was opened to the public in 1888.

In 1887, Birley joined the British Association for the Advancement of Science following the Association's conference in Manchester. The following year she became a life member, attending the Association's annual meetings every year until her death. In 1890, she joined the Geologists' Association and, in 1894, she joined the Malacological Society of London, founded the year before.

=== Field trips ===
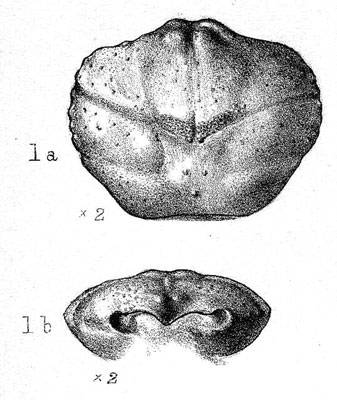
Dromiopsis birleyae – a fossil crustacean discovered by Caroline Birley

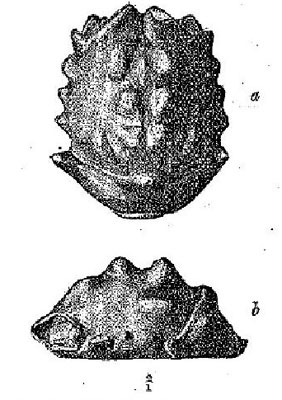
Mesodromilities birleyi – fossil crab discovered by Caroline Birley

Between 1887 and 1905, Birley regularly travelled abroad to collect geological specimens, usually accompanied by her friend Louisa Copland. These field trips included:

- January 1887 – Egypt
- June 1887 – Cortina d'Ampezzo, Italy
- July 1888 – Faxe, Denmark
- May 1889 – Faeroe Islands
- May 1890 – Faeroe Islands
- July 1891 – Faxe, Denmark
- November 1891 – Malta
- November 1892 – Algiers, Algeria
- November 1893 – Corsica and Italy
- August 1897 – Canada and Colorado
- April 1899 – The Azores
- April 1902 – Boulogne, France
- July 1905 – Cape Town, South Africa

On her trips to Faxe in Denmark in 1888 and 1891, she collected a large amount of Late Cretaceous fossils. In the November 1901 edition of The Geological Magazine, Dr. Henry Woodward (of the Natural History Museum, London) described Birley's finds and named two new species of the genus Dromiopsis (D. birleyae and D. coplandae) after Birley and her friend, Louisa Copland. In naming Dromiopsis birleyae, Woodward wrote:

I dedicate this species to my friend Miss Caroline Birley, who has given so much time and attention to the study of geology and palaeontology both at home and abroad, and whose private collection bears testimony to her devotion to science.

During her 1889 visit to the Faeroes, she collected six hundredweight of rocks containing zeolites from the islands of Streymoy, Nólsoy and Eysturoy. In 1891, she and Louisa Copland contributed an article on the flora of the Faeroe Islands to The Journal of Botany. In September 1899, she discovered a new genus and species of crab in the gault clays at Folkestone, Kent; Woodward described this in The Geological Magazine and named it Mesodromilites birleyae.

She also visited Ormara in Baluchistan (now Balochistan in western Pakistan); her collection of fossiliferous nodules was given to Richard Bullen Newton who described them in detail in the July 1905 edition of The Geological Magazine, with Woodward adding a further note.

== Children's author ==
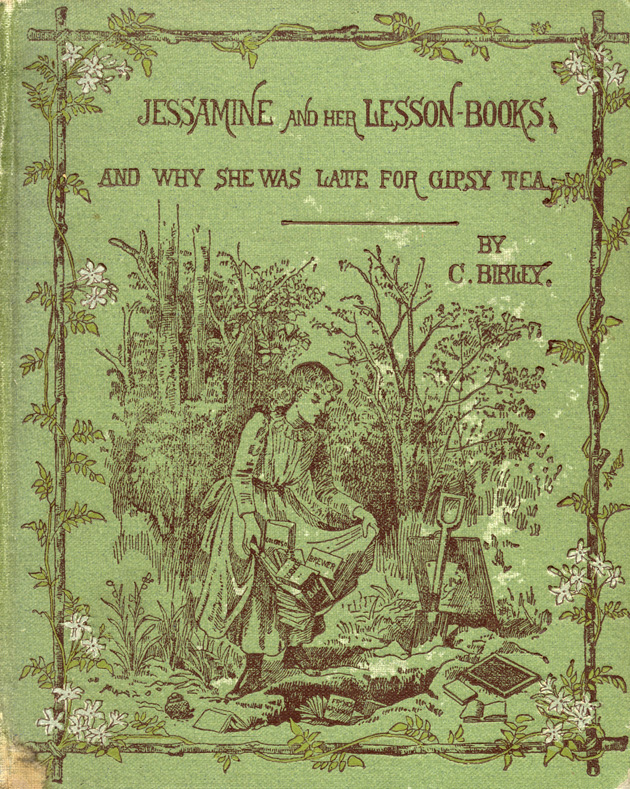
Jessamine and her Lesson Books (1887)

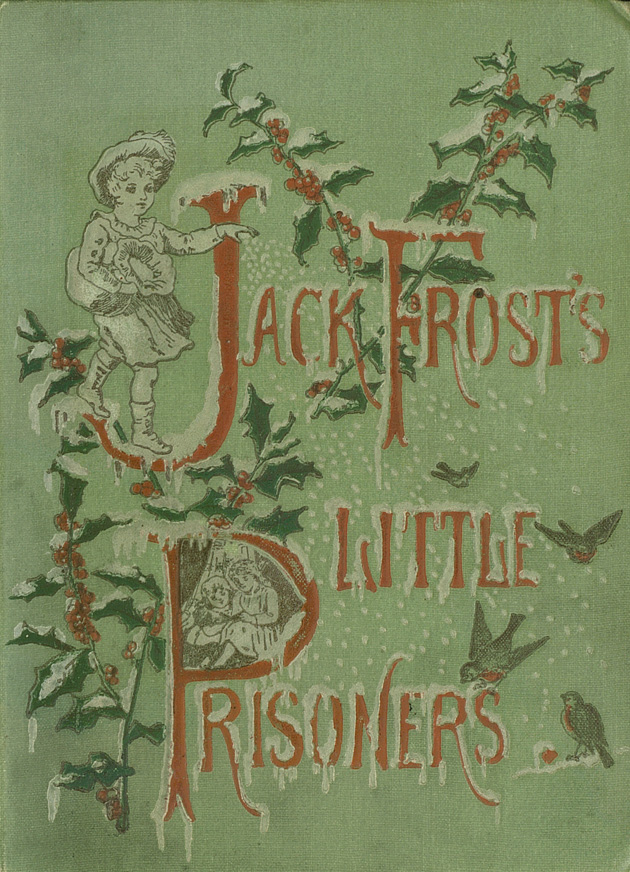
Jack Frost's Little Prisoners (1887)

She wrote several books for children, many of which were published by the Society for the Promotion of Christian Knowledge. Her books include:

- We are Seven (1879)
- A Heap of Stones (1881)
- Undine; a Romance of Modern Days; and Other Stories (1883)
- Oh Dear! What Can the Matter Be? A Tale of Churchill Wakes (1883)
- Eyes to the Blind: A tale (1886)
- Gerald's Rescue (1886)
- Jessamine and her Lesson Books, and How She Missed the Gipsey Tea (1887)
- The Linen Room Window, or "What snow conceals, the sun reveals" (1898)

She also contributed to two volumes of short stories:

- My Birthday Present: A Series of Original Birthday Stories for Boys and Girls from Six to Twelve Years of Age (1886) Contributors:Sabine Baring-Gould, Caroline Birley, Helen Wilmot-Buxton, Ethel M. Wilmot-Buxton, Frances Charlton and Frances Clare.
- Jack Frost's Little Prisoners: A collection of stories for children from four to twelve years of age (1887) Contributors: Stella Austin, Sabine Baring-Gould, Caroline Birley, Lord Brabourne (E.H. Knatchbull-Hugessen), Lucy Fletcher-Massey, Mrs. Molesworth, Anne Thackeray Ritchie, Ethel M. Wilmot-Buxton and Charlotte Mary Yonge. Caroline Birley's contribution was A Christmas Wheatsheaf.

=== Other books ===
- My Lady Bountiful: A true tale of Harriet, Duchess of St. Albans (1888)

== Later life and death ==
In 1896, she moved to Brunswick Gardens in Kensington, to where she also relocated her collection. Towards the end of her life, she returned to Pendleton.

She spent most of her days in the British Museum, naming and arranging her specimens. Despite suffering from ill-health, she attended the meeting of the British Association for the Advancement of Science in York in August 1906. Her health continued to deteriorate in the autumn, but she still continued to label her latest finds, which included a large slab of New Red Sandstone from the Stourton Quarries near Birkenhead with Labyrinthodont footprints on its surface.

In February 1907, she suffered a bout of influenza and died of a heart attack on 15 February. She was buried at Lingfield Church, Surrey, near the home of her brother, Francis. She was unmarried and had no children.

== Legacy ==
In 1894, she donated eight specimens of zeolite group minerals from the Faroe Islands and Iceland to the Manchester Museum.

Her will directed that most of her collection of geological specimens should be donated to the London Natural History Museum, with any material not wanted there to be passed to the Manchester Museum, with the request that her material should be labelled as belonging to the "Caroline Birley Collection". Her executors, Lazarus Fletcher of the Natural History Museum and her brother, Francis, distributed her collection more widely, with gifts to the Manchester Grammar School, the University of Oxford and to museums at Bolton, Bury, Rochdale, Radcliffe and Warrington.

Her obituary, published in The Geological Magazine, said of her:

By the death of Miss Caroline Birley, a most ardent and enthusiastic student has been lost to the science of Geology, one who from her childhood to the end of her life never wavered in devotion to this her cherished pursuit, nor thought any fatigue or personal sacrifice too great in order to visit places of geological interest and obtain specimens for her beloved Museum.
