= Bernice Ackerman =

American meteorologist

Bernice Ackerman (1925– July 5, 1995, Lake View, Chicago) was an American meteorologist, known for being the first woman weathercaster in the U.S. and the first woman meteorologist at Argonne National Laboratory.

== Early life and education ==
Born in Chicago, Ackerman was the valedictorian of her graduating class at Lake View High School. Prior to attending college, she was a weather observer and flight briefer for the Women Accepted for Volunteer Emergency Service (WAVES) in World War II. Ackerman attended the University of Chicago throughout her education, where she received her a bachelor's degree in meteorology and Phi Beta Kappa in 1948, her master's degree in meteorology in 1955, and her PhD in geophysical science in 1965.

== Career and research ==
After earning her bachelor's degree, Ackerman took up a position as a meteorologist and hydrologist at the U.S. Weather Bureau, where she stayed until 1953. She then moved to Argonne National Laboratory, where she was the only woman to research in its Cloud Physics Laboratory, a joint project with the University of Chicago. After earning her PhD, Ackerman became an assistant professor at Texas A&M University; she was promoted to associate professor in 1967. While there, she taught cloud physics and boundary layer meteorology. She left Texas A&M in 1970 and returned to Argonne for two years, then moved to the Illinois State Water Survey at the University of Illinois, where she stayed until 1989, eventually becoming the head of the meteorology section.

== Professional memberships ==
- Fellow, American Association for the Advancement of Science
- Fellow, American Meteorological Society
- Member, American Geophysical Union
