= Robert Ackerman =

Robert or Rob Ackerman may refer to:

- Robert Allan Ackerman (1944–2022), American film director
- Robert Ackerman (politician) (1937–2022), American politician from Oregon
- Rob Ackerman (rugby) (born 1961), Welsh rugby player
- Rob Ackerman (playwright) (born 1958), American playwright

== See also ==
- Ackerman (surname)
