= James Ackerman =

James Ackerman may refer to:

- James S. Ackerman (1919–2016), American architectural historian
- James Waldo Ackerman (1926–1984), United States federal judge
- James David Ackerman (born 1950), American botanist

== See also ==
- Ackerman (surname)
