= List of mayors of Pietermaritzburg =

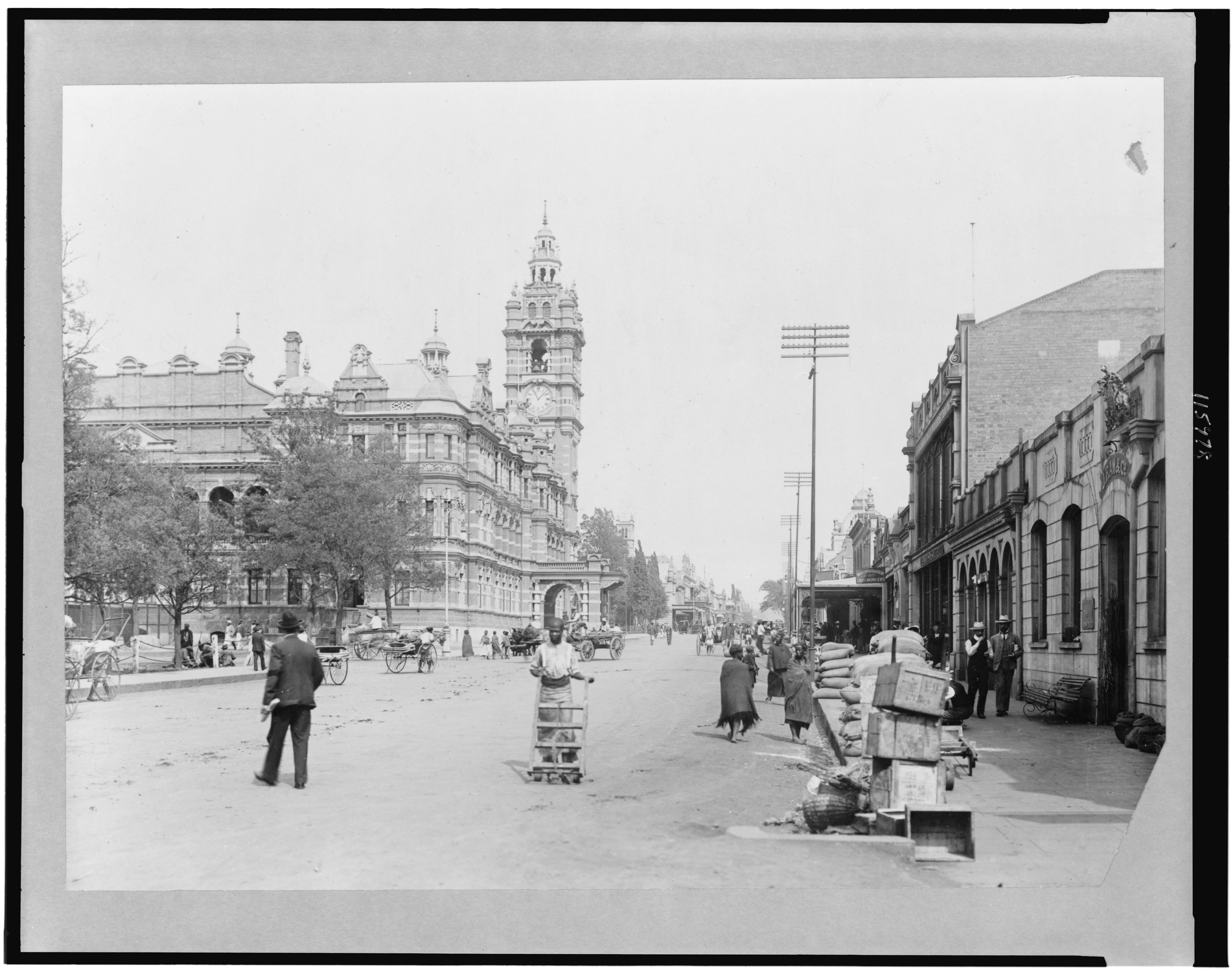
Town Hall (at left) on Church Street in Pietermaritzburg, circa 1900s-1930s

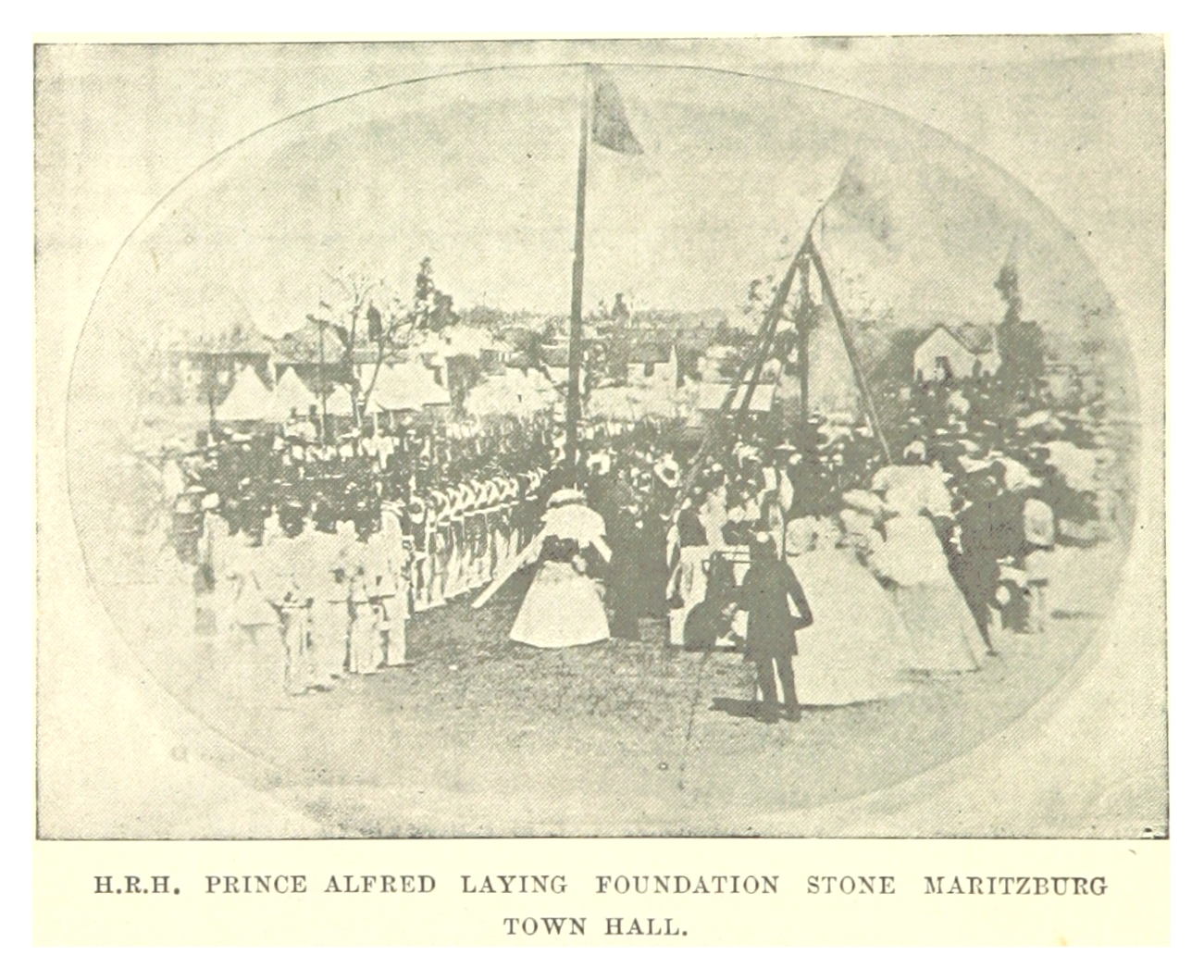
Laying of foundation stone of Pietermaritzburg Town Hall, 1898

The following is a list of mayors of Pietermaritzburg, South Africa. The British dominated Pietermaritzburg government until the second half of the 20th century. National white minority rule in South Africa ended in 1994. When the Msunduzi Local Municipality formed circa 2001, its mayoralty included Pietermaritzburg.

- D. D. Buchanan, 1854
- D. B. Scott, 1855
- P. Ferreira, 1856
- W. Leathern and G. Thompson, 1857
- J. Archbell, 1858, 1860-1863
- John William Ackerman, 1859
- E. Tomlinson, 1864-1866, 1870
- S. Williams, 1867-1869, 1882
- J. Russom, 1869
- W. George, 1870-1871
- P. Davis, Sr., 1872-1873, 1879
- Henry Pepworth, 1874
- John Fleming, 1875-1876
- W. Francis, 1877-1878
- A. W. Kershaw, 1880
- John Roseveare, 1881
- H. Griffin, 1883
- E. Owen, 1884-1885
- J. J. Chapman, 1886-1888
- E. S. T. Stantial, 1889
- W.E. Bale, 1890, 1893
- Richard Mason, 1891-1892
- P. Carbis, 1894
- C. G. Levy, 1895
- P. F. Payn, 1896
- T. W. Woodhouse, 1897
- George James Macfarlane, circa 1898-1901
- W.J. O'Brien, circa 1905
- ?
- H. Collins, circa 1934
- ?

== Msunduzi Local Municipality ==
- Hloni Glenford Zondi, circa 2000-2006
- Zanele Hlatshwayo, 2006-2010
- Mike Tarr, May 2010-?
- Chris Ndlela, 2011-2016
- Themba Njilo, 2016-2019
- Mzimkhulu Thebolla, 2019–present

== See also ==
- Pietermaritzburg history and timeline
- Msunduzi Local Municipality, est. circa 2001
- British Colony of Natal, 1843–1910
- Union of South Africa (British dominion), 1910–1961
