= David Semple =

British immunologist and physician

Sir David Semple
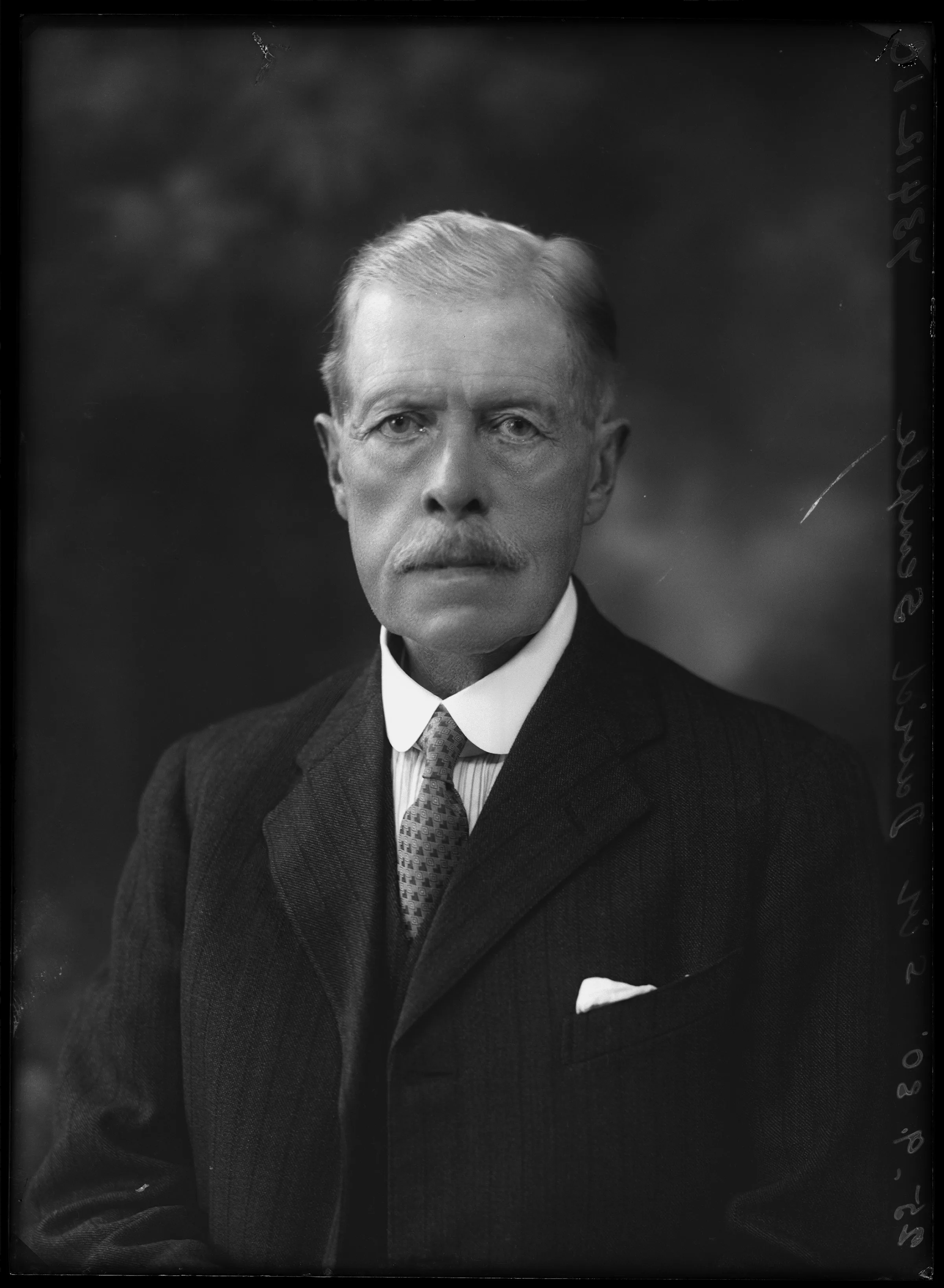
- Semple in 1930
- Born: 6 April 1856; Derry, Ireland
- Died: 7 January 1937 (aged 80); Paddington, London, England
- Military career
- Allegiance: United Kingdom
- Branch: Royal Army Medical Corps
- Service years: 1883-
- Rank: Lieutenant-Colonel
- Other work: Bacteriologist

Lieutenant-Colonel Sir David Semple (6 April 1856 – 7 January 1937) was a British Army officer who founded the Pasteur Institute at Kasauli in the Indian state of Himachal Pradesh. The institute later came to be known as the Central Research Institute (CRI).

Semple was born in Derry, the son of William Semple of Castlederg, County Tyrone. He was educated at Foyle College and earned his MD and MCh degrees at Queen's University Belfast, followed by his Public Health degree from Cambridge in 1892.

Semple joined the Royal Army Medical Corps as a surgeon on 3 February 1883, and was promoted to surgeon-major on 3 February 1895. He was stationed in Punjab when he was promoted to lieutenant-colonel on 3 February 1903.

In 1911, he developed a nerve-tissue based rabies vaccine from the brains of sheep first made rabid and then killed. The 'Semple' vaccine however is known to have side-effects such as paralysis with high risk of other diseases, being just a crude form of churned brain-tissue. It needs administration around the stomach in a series of very painful injections administered over a period of seven to 14 days, a course that many do not complete. Moreover, it is not reliable and the World Health Organization (WHO) has been advocating its total disuse since 1993. (WHO literature )

He was given a knighthood in 1911, and is buried in City of Westminster Cemetery, Hanwell.
