= HMHS Newfoundland =

Sunk British Royal Mail and hospital ship

Coordinates: 40°13′N 14°21′E

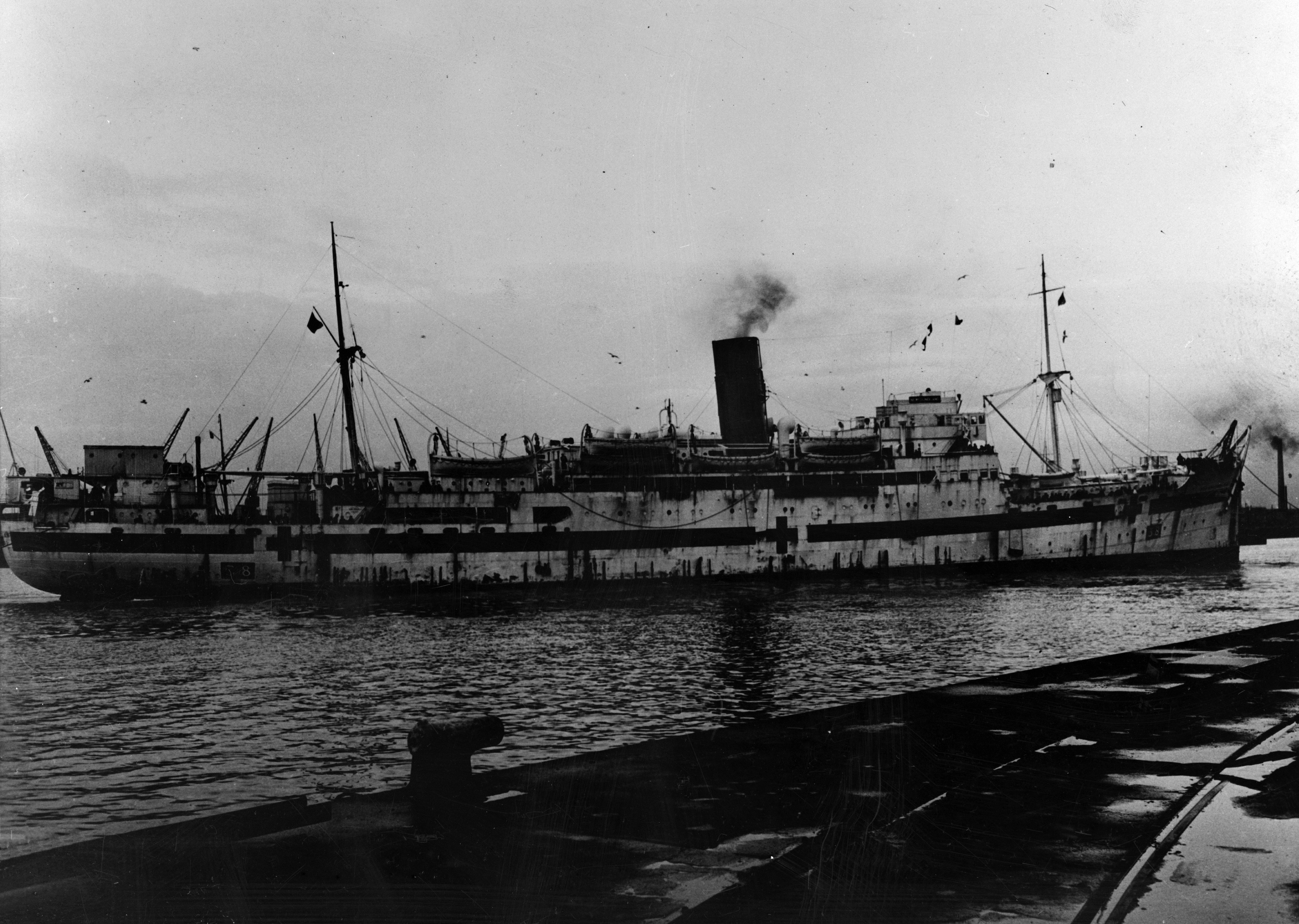

History

United Kingdom
- Name: RMS Newfoundland (1925–40); HMHS Newfoundland (1940–1943)
- Owner: Johnston Warren Lines (1925–40)
- Operator: Furness, Withy & Co (1925–40)
- Port of registry: (United Kingdom) Liverpool
- Route: Liverpool – St John's, Newfoundland – Halifax, Nova Scotia – Boston, MA (1925–?)
- Builder: Vickers, Sons & Maxim, Barrow-in-Furness
- Yard number: 617
- Launched: 24 January 1925
- Completed: June 1925
- Out of service: 13 September 1943
- Identification: UK official number 147312; code letters: KSPG (until 1933); Call sign: GKJF (from 1934)
- Fate: Damaged by a Luftwaffe bomb 40 miles off Salerno, 13 September 1943 Scuttled, 14 September 1943

General characteristics
- Type: Passenger ship; Hospital ship
- Tonnage: 6,791 GRT; 3,828 NRT
- Length: 406.1 ft (123.8 m)
- Beam: 55.4 ft (16.9 m)
- Draught: 31.8 ft (9.7 m)
- Installed power: 1,047 NHP
- Propulsion: Vickers quadruple expansion steam engine
- Speed: 15 knots (28 km/h; 17 mph)
- Notes: sister ship: RMS Nova Scotia

HMHS Newfoundland was a British Royal Mail Ship that was requisitioned as a hospital ship in the World War II. She was sunk in 1943 in a Luftwaffe attack off southern Italy. At that point she was one of three ships brightly illuminated, bearing standard Red Cross markings as hospital ships, which was her function, so due protection under the Geneva Convention.

== Building ==
Vickers, Sons & Maxim, Ltd of Barrow-in-Furness built Newfoundland for Furness, Withy & Co of Liverpool. Her 1,047 NHP quadruple expansion steam engine was fed by five 215 lb_{f}/in^{2} single-ended boilers with a total heating surface of 16,095 square feet (1,495 m^{2}). Her boilers were heated by 20 oil-fuelled corrugated furnaces with a grate surface of 377 square feet (35 m^{2}).

== Civilian service ==
Newfoundland worked Furness, Withy's regular transatlantic mail route between Liverpool and Boston via St John's, Newfoundland and Halifax, Nova Scotia. In May 1926 she was joined by a sister ship, RMS Nova Scotia.

== Early war service ==
In April 1943 Newfoundland repatriated some Allied servicemen from Lisbon to Avonmouth, England. Among them was Flight Lieutenant John F. Leeming RAF, who had been captured with Air Marshal Owen Tudor Boyd (as his Aide-de-Camp) in 1940. His escape plan from Vincigliata PG 12 prisoner of war camp in Italy was by cleverly faking a very bad nervous breakdown case. He succeeded so well that the international medical board, with Swiss and Italian doctors, unhesitatingly accepted his case. As he describes in his book:

In the late afternoon (18 April 1943) we went aboard the British hospital ship Newfoundland, which was lying at the quay ready to sail for England. I walked quickly up the gangway, and as I felt my two feet touch the ship's deck I looked up - I suppose I am too sentimental - at the flag flying from the masthead. "Done it!" I said aloud.

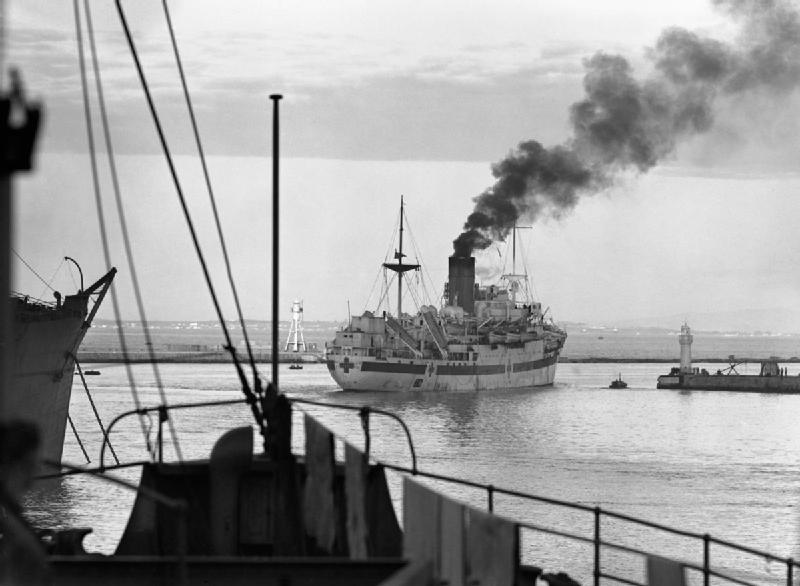
HMHS Newfoundland leaving Algiers harbour, 1943.

== Hospital ship ==
After the Allied invasion of Italy in September 1943, HMHS Newfoundland was assigned as the hospital ship of the Eighth Army, and was one of two hospital ships sent to deliver 103 American nurses to the Salerno beaches on 12 September. The hospital ships were attacked twice that day by dive bombers, and by evening they were joined by a third hospital ship. Concerned by a number of near misses, it was decided to move the ships out to sea and anchor there for the night. All three ships were brightly illuminated and carried standard Red Cross markings to identify them as hospital ships, and their protection under the Geneva Convention.

At 5:00 a.m. on 13 September while under the command of Captain John Eric Wilson O.B.E, Newfoundland was hit by a Henschel Hs 293 air-launched glide bomb 40 nautical miles (74 km) offshore of Salerno. The bomb was launched by a Dornier Do 217 bomber belonging to KG 100. It struck on the boat deck, abaft of the bridge. The ship was only carrying two patients and 34 crew members. Communications were lost but, more importantly, the fire fighting equipment was completely shattered. Mayo came alongside to rescue the patients, and also put a party on board to help with damage control. By now the ship had caught fire. There was another explosion and it became clear that the oil tanks had also caught fire. The injured crew left the boat and 12 crew members battled the fire for a further 36 hours. The ship was beyond repair and was towed further out to sea and intentionally scuttled the day after the attack by the destroyer Plunkett. Of the people on board, six of the British staff nurses and six medical officers had been killed. One of the medical officers was Lt Col Hartas Foxton, MC 1889 - 1943 who had been a GP in Uttoxeter until the War. Four of the other RAMC doctors who were killed were Major Charles Ryan, RAMC 65313 aged 38, Major George Alexander Hay Adam, RAMC 108781, Major George North Watson, RAMC 75408 and Captain Harry Mathews, RAMC 157582 aged 29. The six Nurses who were killed were Matron Agnes McInnes Cheyne, QAIMNS, 206099, Sister Una Cameron, TANS, 209965 aged 31, Sister Dorothy Mary Cole, QAIMNS, 218052 aged 29, Sister Phyllis Gibson, QAIMNS, 223596 aged 31, Sister Mary Lea, TANS, 213741, aged 31, and Sister Annie Margaret O’Loughlin, QAIMNS, 234988, aged 27.

== See also ==
- HMS Newfoundland (59) - Fiji-class cruiser 1943-1959, sold to Peru as BAP Almirante Grau 1959-1973, Capitan Quinones 1973-1979
- HMCS Newfoundland - proposed and cancelled Canada-class nuclear submarine for Canadian Forces Maritime Command
