= Susan Ackerman =

Susan Ackerman may refer to:

- Susan Ackerman (biblical scholar) (born 1958), American biblical scholar
- Susan Ackerman (neuroscientist), American neuroscientist and geneticist
- Susan Rose-Ackerman (born 1942), American economist and legal scholar
