= 2021 Pietermaritzburg power outage =

Power outage in South Africa in 2021

2021 Pietermaritzburg Power Outage
- Date: 16 December 2021
- Location: Pietermaritzburg
- Cause: Substation explosion

The 2021 Pietermaritzburg Power Outage is a power outage that began in December 2021.

== Background ==
On 16 December 2021 the Northdale primary substation exploded in the early hours leaving individuals in the Msunduzi municipality in the dark for over a week.

Residents began protesting and blocking National roads after Eskom’s progress in the repair seemed to be nonexistent A local petition was also able to gain over 1,200 signatures.

== See also ==
- South African Energy Crisis
