= Not Forgotten Association =

The Not Forgotten
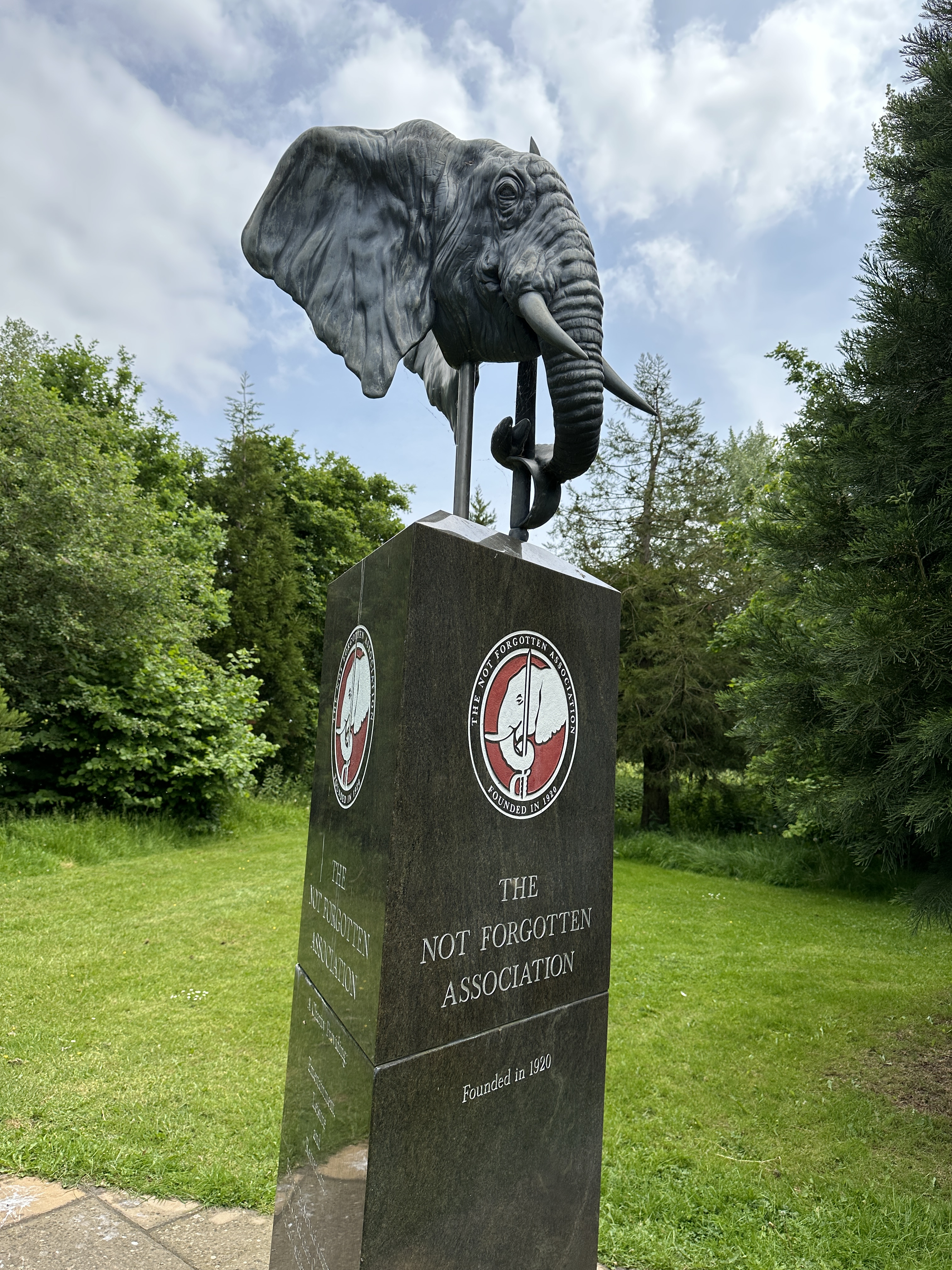
- A memorial to the Not Forgotten Association at the National Memorial Arboretum
- Formation: 1920
- Legal status: Charity
- Headquarters: London
- Region served: United Kingdom of Great Britain and Northern Ireland
- Patron: Anne, Princess Royal
- Website: www.thenotforgotten.org

The Not Forgotten Association (known as 'The Not Forgotten') is a British Armed Forces registered charity for serving and ex-servicemen and women that operates throughout the United Kingdom. The Not Forgotten combats isolation and loneliness in the Armed Forces community by providing entertainment, social activities, challenge holidays and respite breaks for those who are wounded, injured, and sick.

== History ==
=== Formation ===
At the outbreak of the First World War, American soprano Marta Cunningham was residing in London. She undertook charity and canteen work in the East End, which she continued after the cessation of hostilities. In 1919 while visiting her local hospital, Cunningham asked the matron if she still had any wounded servicemen under treatment. Martha was horrified to find out that there were in fact 600 injured patients in the hospital, with thousands of wounded men lying in hospitals, bored, lonely and in pain.

Cunningham established The Not Forgotten Association on 12 August 1920, with the object of providing entertainment and recreation for the war wounded, to alleviate some of the struggles that they were facing and give them something to look forward to.

=== Early events ===
Thanks to the generosity of other charities and the public, as well as the firm backing of the Royal Family, hospital visits and tea concerts were followed by outings, drives and gifts such as fruit, chocolate and cigarettes. Within the first year, the charity supported approximately 10,000 veterans.

Cunningham devoted the rest of her life to the charity, for which in 1929 she was appointed a CBE. Cunningham herself died on 25 June 1937.

The Not Forgotten sadly, lost many of its early records following an air raid in 1941.

=== WWII onwards ===
Whilst the aims of The Not Forgotten have remained much the same throughout its history, it has adapted to meet the changing needs of the serving wounded and veterans with disabilities. The Second World War brought a huge increase in the number of disabled service men and women and a renewed need for the charity’s work. This new generation of the injured and sick were there to be helped alongside the ‘Boys of the Old Brigade’ who required care as never before.

In the 1960s the number of veterans eligible for their assistance dwindled. However, with the deployment of Armed Forces in Northern Ireland, the Falklands, the Balkans, Iraq, Afghanistan and elsewhere, the need for their work grows no less.

== Purpose ==
In 1926, the Association officially defined its task as being ‘to provide comfort, cheer and entertainment for the wounded ex-servicemen still in hospital as a result of the Great War'.

Since then, they have broadened their scope, and now support any veteran or serving member of The Armed Forces, who is wounded, injured, or sick. They have also focused their intentions on preventing loneliness and isolation; a problem which is particularly common among veterans.

== Patronage ==
Cunningham persuaded Princess Mary to become the charity's first patron; a position she held until her death in 1965.

The Duchess of Kent took over as patron in 1965, until she stepped down from her role 35 years later, in 2000.

She was succeeded by Princess Anne, who is The Not Forgotten's patron today.

The Not Forgotten continues to be supported by the Royal Family, who allow them to hold a gathering in Buckingham Palace, and St James's Palace each year for thousands of veterans.

== Today ==
The Not Forgotten uses the motto 'From Comradeship to Challenge' to describe its services, which vary considerably in nature.

They support veterans of all ages and have expanded their programme of activities over the years to include people with different abilities and interests. The Not Forgotten continues to host many of the events associated with its development, such as the Garden Party at Buckingham Palace, concerts at care homes, lunches and social gatherings. The organisation has also added respite breaks and challenge holidays to its services, allowing younger veterans to take part in activities such as skiing and hiking.

For some veterans, who are bed-bound or isolated at home, their services can also include the delivery of televisions, TV licenses, online concerts, gifts, and phone calls.

They continue to support an average of 10,000 beneficiaries each year, and estimate that they have supported one million beneficiaries since their inception.
