= Whitetip shark =

Whitetip shark may refer to:

- Oceanic whitetip shark, Carcharhinus longimanus.
- Whitetip reef shark, Triaenodon obesus.
- Whitetip weasel shark, Paragaleus leucolomatus
