= Andrea Ackerman =

American artist, theorist and writer

- Education: Yale College; Harvard Medical School
- Notable work: ‘’Rose Breathing’’
- Movement: New media
- Website: https://www.andreaackerman.com

Andrea Ackerman is an American artist, theorist and writer best known for her New Media artworks. She lives and works in New York.

== Education ==
At Yale, Ackerman studied physics and biophysics; afterward, she graduated from Harvard Medical School and practiced as a psychiatrist and psychoanalyst. She has used digital technology since the mid-1990s in order to fabricate her work, which dabbles in the realms concerning technology, nature, aesthetics, and ethics.

== Career ==
She imbues objects with qualities not ordinarily occurring in nature, and in doing so fabricates a “synthetic” nature. Specific aspects of 2D and 3D still and animation software are applied in subtle ways like using effects meant for fluids on rose petals or skin. Ackerman believes finding meaningful ways to use these effects is essential to the evocation of a seamless transformation - digital to human.

Ackerman has taught 3D computer modeling (Maya) at Pratt Institute in Brooklyn, was a co-director of ISEA2011, and is an editor of Leonardo Electronic Almanac, most recently, the associate editor of Uncontainable, the exhibition catalog of electronic art exhibited at ISEA2011, Istanbul. Ackerman lives in New York, New York with her husband and two children.

== Exhibitions ==
Title	Venue	Location	Date
Art Learning Lab: Koret Gallery	San Jose Museum of Art	San Jose, CA	August 12, 2024 - June 1, 2025
Extended Senses & Embodying Technology 2022	Stephen Lawrence Gallery, University of Greenwich	London, UK	September 8, 2022 - September 10, 2022
Almost Human: Digital Art from the Permanent Collection	San Jose Museum of Art	San Jose, CA	September 22, 2019 - September 27, 2020
Your Mind this Moment: Art and the Practice of Attention	San Jose Museum of Art	San Jose, CA	February 17, 2017 - August 27, 2017
Momentum: An Experiment in the Unexpected	San Jose Museum of Art	San Jose, CA	October 2, 2014 - February 22, 2015
Vital Signs: New Media Art from the San Jose Museum of Art	Wichita Art Museum	Wichita, KS	September 14, 2013 - January 19, 2014
Vital Signs	San Jose Museum of Art	San Jose, CA	June 12, 2010 -February 6, 2011
Polymer	Hunter Museum of American Art	Chattanooga, TN	March 26, 2009
NABLAB Volume 1	NAB Gallery	Chicago, IL	November 17, 2006- December 8, 2006
Instant Gratification	Like the Spice Gallery	Brooklyn, NY	January 12, 2007- February 17, 2007
Rose Breathing	Live Box Gallery	Chicago, IL	April 23–27, 2006
Poesia in Forma di Rosa	La Galleria Comunale d'Arte Contemporanea di Monfalcone	Italy	November 4, 2005
Brides of Frankenstein	San Jose Museum of Art	San Jose, CA	July 30, 2005 – October 30, 2005
Second Nature	Fish Tank Gallery	Brooklyn, NY	June 18, 2004- July 19, 2004
Allure Electronica	Wood Street Galleries	Pittsburgh, PA	January 23, 2004- March 6, 2004
Cartoombria 2003	Center for Contemporary Art Trebisonda	Perugia, Italy	Dec. 3-Dec 7, 2003
New Lawn: Contemporary Nature in a Subdivision World	Jack the Pelican Presents	Brooklyn, NY	July 2, 2003- Aug 3, 2003
Calculus of Transfiguration	Williamsburg Art and Historical Center	Brooklyn, NY	October 10, 1998 - November 15, 1998
Group Show	Name Brand Damages	Brooklyn, NY	1993

== Selected collections ==
- San Jose Museum of Art

== Writing Links ==
- New Media Art Takes as its Subject the Processes of the Brain/Mind by Andrea Ackerman
- Media N Online Journal
- Some Thoughts Connecting Deterministic Chaos, Neuronal Dynamics and Aesthetic Experience LEA Journal Article by Andrea Ackerman
- Leonardo Electronic Almanac Vol 17 No 1 (2010): Mish Mash
- Immersivity and Narrativity in the 3D computer animation Incantation of an Avatar (Down, down, baby, I want some AI please): a brain network model based approach
- https://www.frontiersin.org/journals/human-dynamics/articles/10.3389/fhumd.2026.1803351/full
