= George W. Ackerman =

American photographer

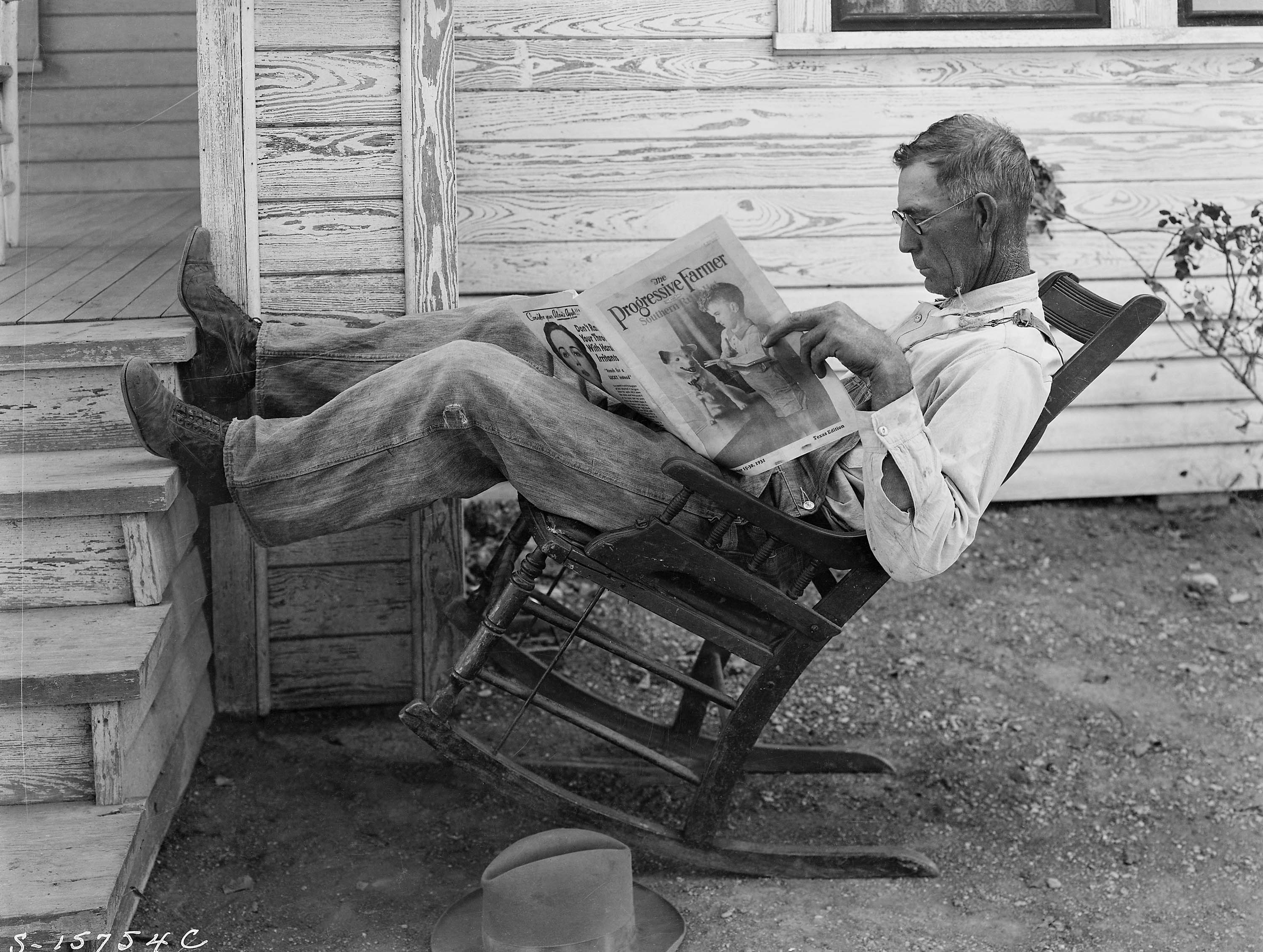
A Farmer Reading His Paper. Photographed by George W. Ackerman, Coryell County, Texas, September 1931.

George W. Ackerman (1884–1962) was an American government photographer. During a nearly 40-year career with the United States Department of Agriculture, it is estimated that he took over 50,000 photographs.

== Biography ==
Ackerman began working as a photographer for the Bureau of Plant Industry in 1910 at a salary of $900 a year. In 1917 he moved to the Federal Extension Service, and in that position, he traveled around the country photographing rural life.
