= Richard Bullen Newton =

British paleontologist

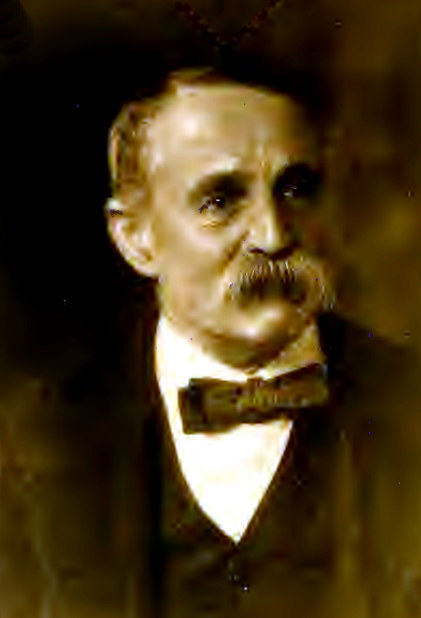
Portrait of Richard Bullen Newton (1920)

Richard Bullen Newton, ISO, (23 February 1854 – 23 January 1926) was a British paleontologist who was between 1910 and 1912 president of the Malacological Society of London and the Conchological Society of Great Britain & Ireland.

Newton is buried at City of Westminster Cemetery, Hanwell.

The World Register of Marine Species (WoRMS) lists 24 marine genera and species named by him.

== Selected publications ==
- "On the necessity for the abandonment of the generic name Cyclostoma, with suggestions regarding others involved in this genus". Annals and Magazine of Natural History. 7 (6). 1891.
- Systematic list of the F. E. Edwards collection of British Oligocene and Eocene mollusca in the British Museum (Natural History). London, British Museum. 1891.
- "On some Tertiary Foraminifera from Borneo collected by Professor Molengraaff and the late Mr. A. H. Everett, and their comparison with similar forms from Sumatra". Annals and Magazine of Natural History. 3 (7). 1899.
- "Eocene Shells from Nigeria". Annals and Magazine of Natural History. 15 (7). 1905.
- "On some Jurassic Mollusca from Arabia". Annals and Magazine of Natural History. 2 (8). 1908.
- "On some freshwater fossils from Central South Africa". Annals and Magazine of Natural History. 5 (9). 1920.
- "On a marine Jurassic fauna from Central Arabia". Annals and Magazine of Natural History. 7 (9). 1921.
- On a marine Jurassic fauna from Central Arabia; Annals And Magazine of Natural History 7 (9), 1921

== Bibliography ==
- B. B. Woodward, 1926. Richard Bullen Newton, I.S.O., F.G.S., etc., 1854-1925 [sic.]. Proceedings of the Malacological Society of London 17(2-3): 69-70
- B. B. Woodward, 1926. Richard Bullen Newton, I.S.O. Quarterly Journal of the Geological Society of London 82(3): xlix-l.
- J. R. le B. Tomlin, 1926. Obituary notice: R. B. Newton. Journal of Conchology 18(1): 11-12
