= Craig Ackerman =

American broadcaster and announcer

Craig Ackerman is the current play-by-play announcer for the Houston Rockets of the National Basketball Association (NBA).

== Early life and education ==
Craig was born to Gerald and Bonnie Ackerman on August 27, 1974, in Cuyahoga Falls, Ohio.

He played college baseball at Houston Baptist University (NAIA), then later graduated from Sam Houston State University in 1997, where he met his wife Shannon. They were married in August 1998. They have two children.
