= St Saviour's Cathedral, Pietermaritzburg =

Church in Pietermaritzburg, South Africa

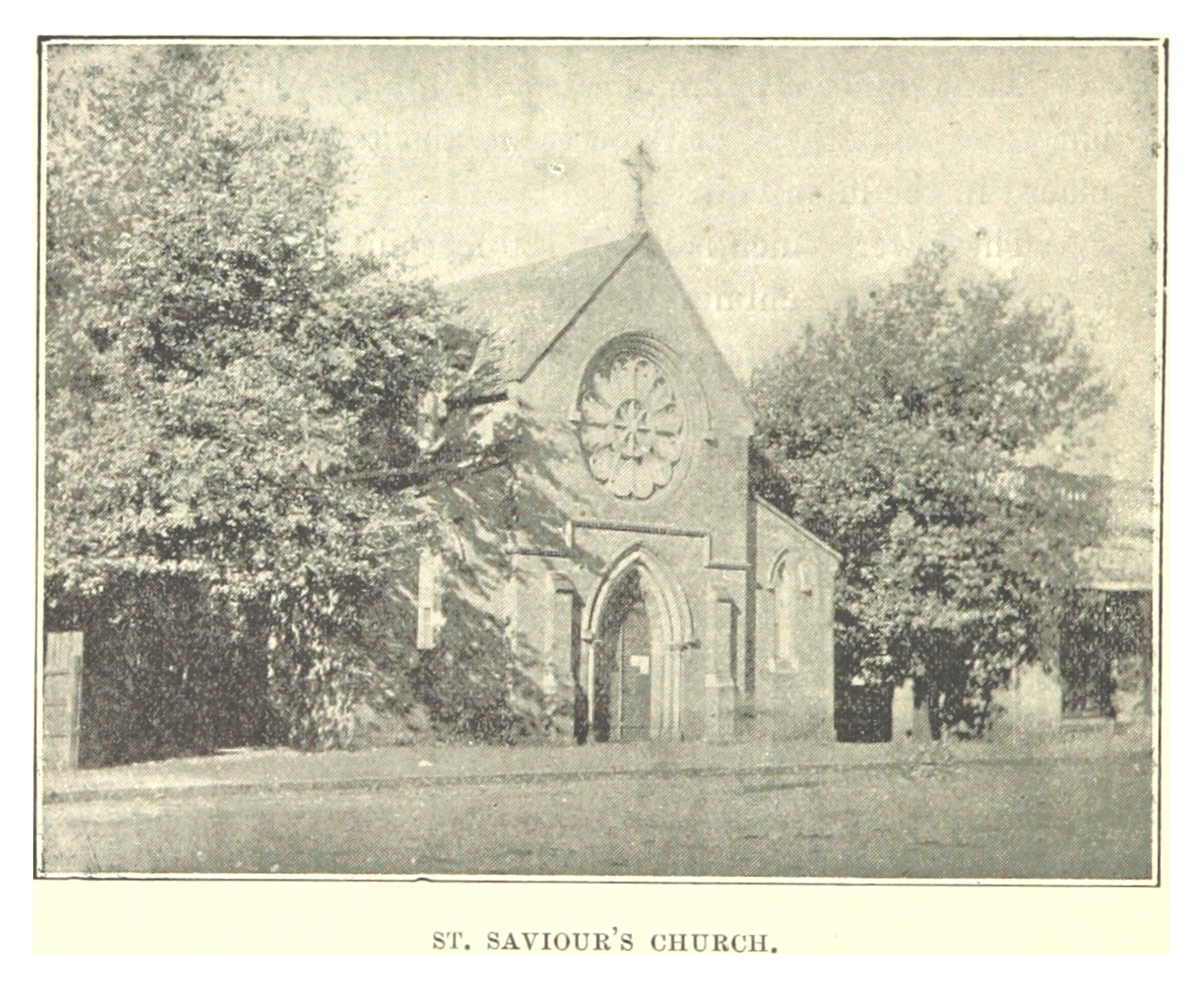
St Saviour's Church, Pietermaritzburg

St Saviour's Cathedral was the home of the Anglican Diocese of Natal in Pietermaritzburg, South Africa from 1868 until its deconsecration in 1976: it was demolished in 1981.
