= Shuter & Shooter Publishers =

Publishing house based in South Africa

Shuter & Shooter is a publishing house based in South Africa.

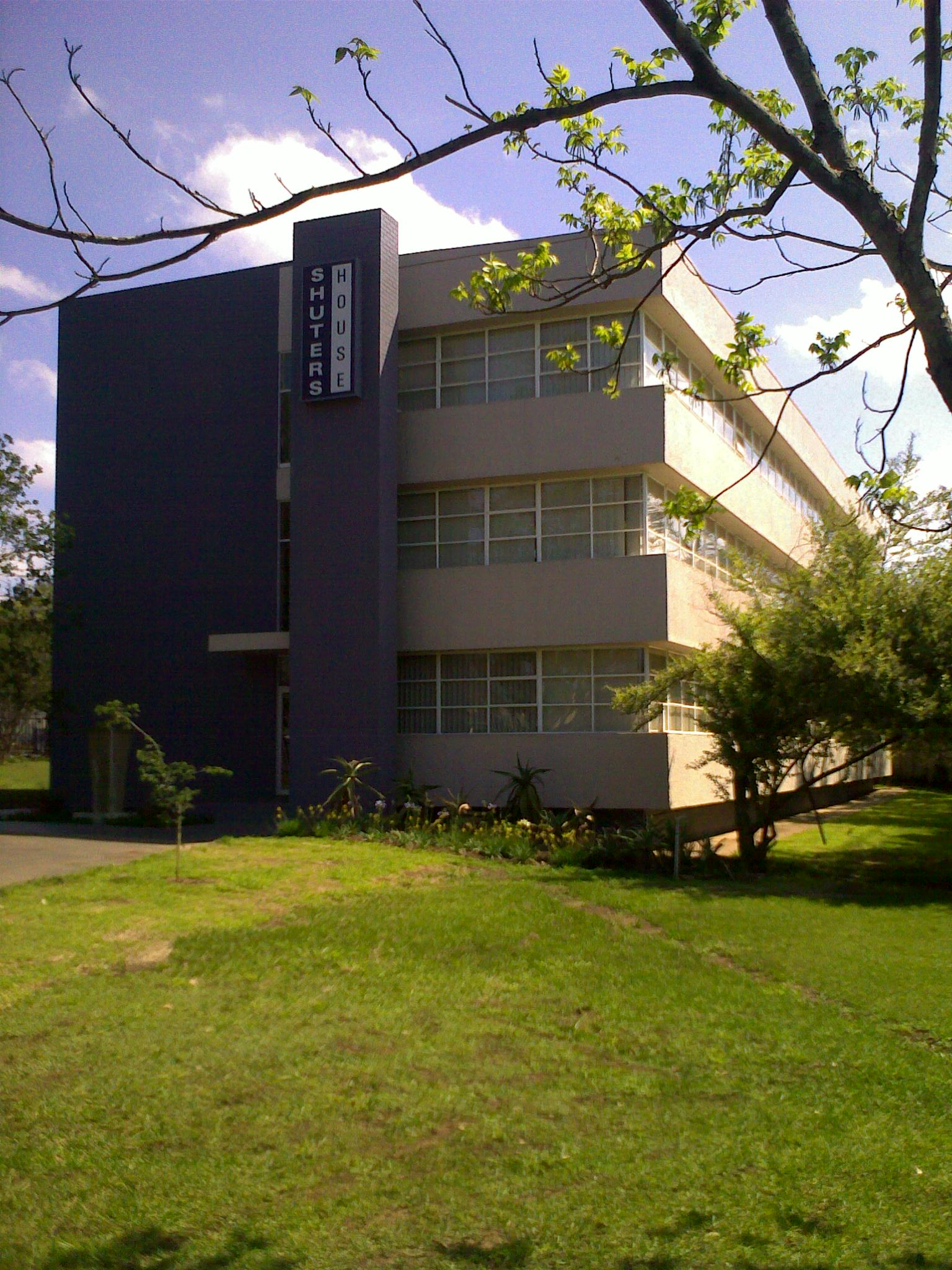

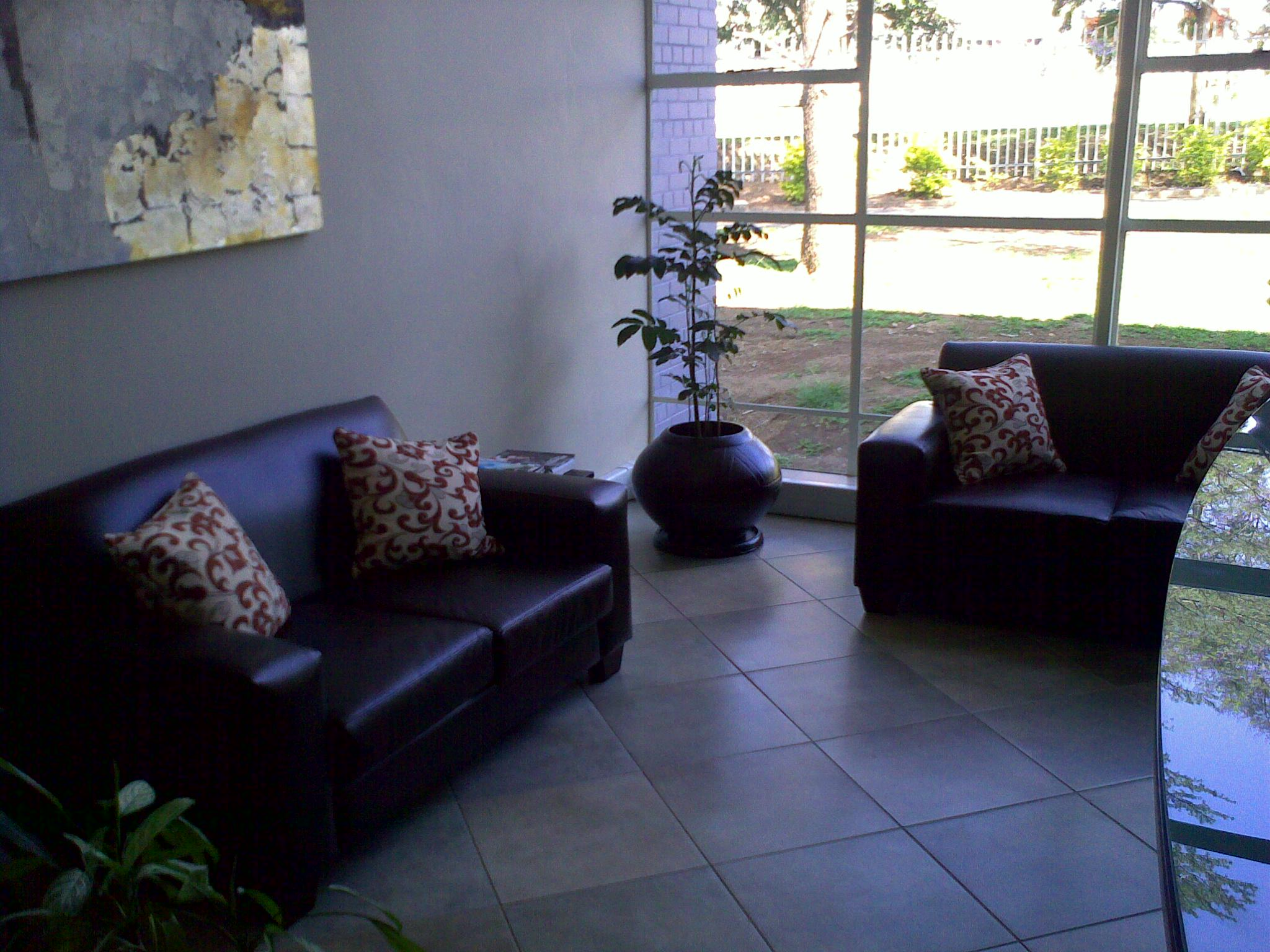

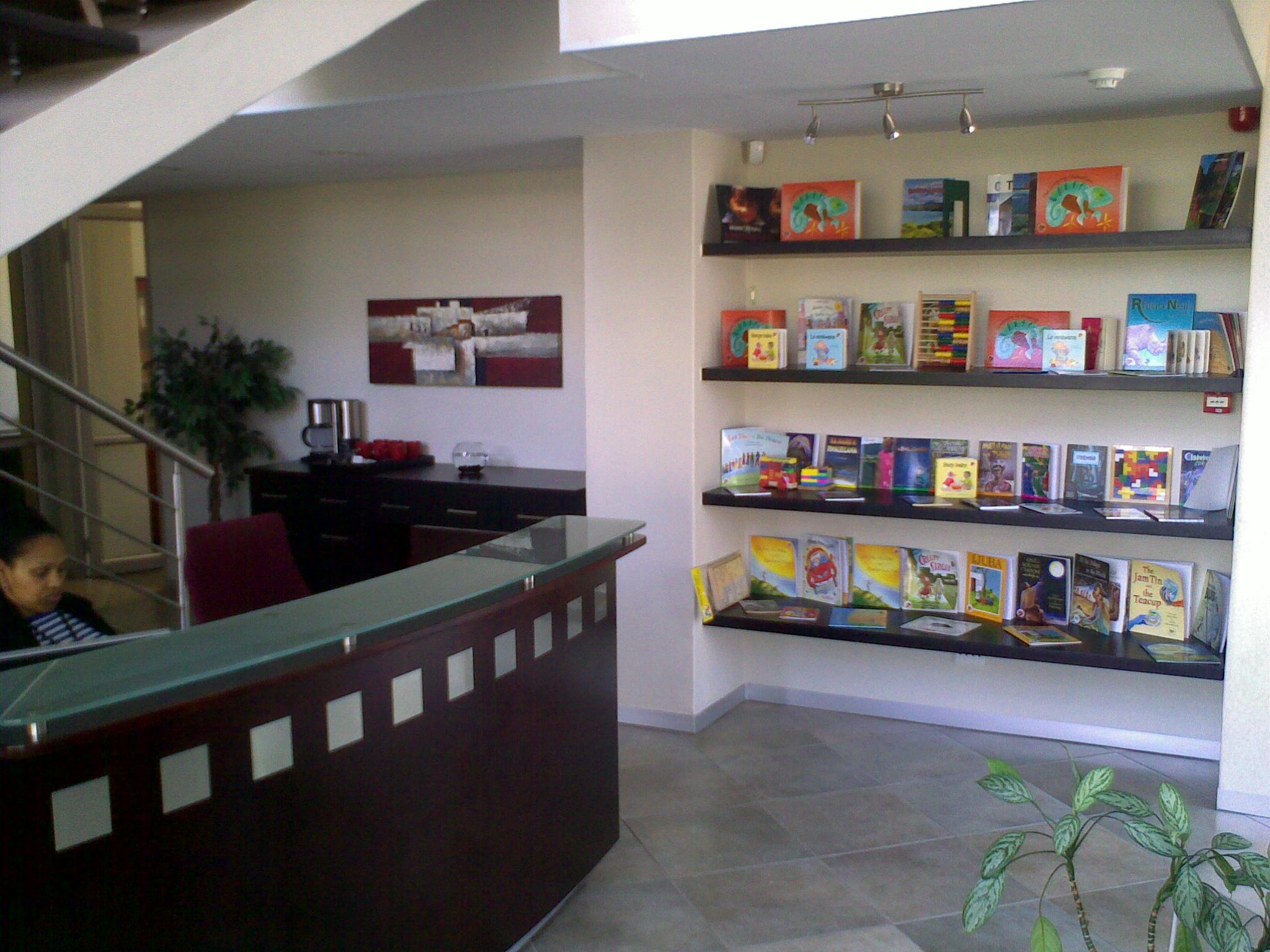

== History ==
One of the earliest business houses in Pietermaritzburg was Vause, Slatter and Co. This company was taken over in 1921 by Mr. L.G. Shuter. In 1925 Mr. R.A. Shooter joined the company and the name was changed to Shuter & Shooter. Mr. L.G. Shuter was the stationer and Mr. R.A. Shooter the bookseller and publisher.

Vause, Slatter and Co. was originally a printing, stationery and music business. According to a letter which we received from the Standard Bank in 1981, when they presented the company with a plaque commemorating 102 years of association, the company Vause, Slatter and Co. was established in 1850. The original trading site was 185 Church Street, the site now occupied by Volkskas Bank. As the business grew, they moved to 192 Church Street (part of the site now occupied by the Sanlam Building) and then to 166 Church Street, next to the cathedral. (Part of the OK Building.) These premises were specially built to their requirements. A further move was made to Grays Inn, 230 Church Street in 1950. The adjoining buildings at 232 Church Street were acquired in 1976 and 1979 and both shop frontages were restored to their Victorian splendour in 1989.

In June 1948 Mr. L.G. Shuter retired and sold his interest to Mr. Cyril Alexander Roy, manager of Wm. Collins in South Africa. In 1951 Mr. R.A. Shooter retired from active directorship and allowed Mr. Roy to acquire financial control of Shuter & Shooter in 1955. The company was registered as a proprietary limited company in 1947. The first board of directors consisted of Messrs L.G. Shuter and R.A. Shooter, C.A. Roy and W.H. Jenkins. At the end of June 1966 Mr. Roy, while remaining on the board, stepped down as chairman of the firm. The Natal Witness (The Witness (South African newspaper)) bought into the company and acquired financial control of Shuter & Shooter (Pty) Ltd. On the retirement of Mr. Roy, Mr. D.M. Craib was appointed chairman of the board and Mr. E.B. Oscroft as managing director. On his retirement in 1977, Mr. M.N. Prozesky was appointed managing director and chairman of the board in December 1979.

Mr. Prozesky retired from the company on 30 April 1993. He was succeeded as chairman of the board by Mr. W.N. Vorster, with Mr. D.F. Ryder, a man whose vast knowledge of alcoholic beverages was well known, taking over as managing director of the Publishing Division and Mr. E.O. Oellermann the Retail Division.

Mr. A. Maher took over the management of the Retail Division on the retirement of Mr. E.O. Oellermann in March 1997.

The firm's publishing activities commenced in the early 1930s, producing mainly Zulu novels, poetry, and textbooks. More recently, the publishing operations have been expanded to cover the requirements of all educational authorities in South Africa.

During World War II, when it was difficult to import books, Shuter's published jointly with overseas publishers, to enable leading titles to be available in sufficient quantity to meet demand.

Shuter & Shooter also introduced one of the first lending libraries in Pietermaritzburg for the sum of a tickey (2 ½ cents) for each book lent.

In 1999 the Publishing Division moved back to the first floor at the shop premises at 230 Church Street after its 10-year lease at 199 Pietermaritz Street expired.

The Publishing Division also has a presence in Cape Town, East London and Randburg. There is a main warehouse at Plessislaer, Pietermaritzburg from which the company distributes its books countrywide. Due to the extremely difficult trading circumstances experienced in 1996, 1997 and 1998, the company was forced to reduce drastically the activities of Ikhwezi Publishers and Read Well Publishers in 1999.

At 1 June 2000 the retail bookshop became a separate company and started trading as Shuter & Shooter Retail (Pty) Ltd. In late 2000 Alan Maher was appointed Managing Director of this company.

Shuter & Shooter (Pty) Ltd. Was then able to focus on its publishing activities.

During 2001 it was decided that Shuter & Shooter (Pty) Ltd. and Reach Out Publishers (Pty) Ltd. would merge their publishing interests and form a new company to be called Shuter & Shooter Publishers (Pty) Ltd.

In May 2002, the shareholders of Shuter & Shooter (Pty) Ltd. and Reach Out Publishers (Pty) Ltd. voted unanimously for this merger to take place.

The new company started trading on 1 June 2002 with Dave Ryder as its Managing Director.

In July 2003, Shuter & Shooter Publishers (Pty) Ltd. moved to 21C Cascades Crescent, Pietermaritzburg.

In January 2008, Primi Chetty took over as Managing Director.

In May 2009, Shuter & Shooter Publishers (Pty) Ltd moved to a new building, Shuters House, 110 CB Downes Road, Mkondeni Pietermaritzburg.
