= Gordon Ackerman =

American journalist

Gordon Ackerman is an American journalist, writer, author and photographer. He was born in Albany, N.Y., the son of E Ackerman, a feed and grain executive, and H Ackerman, a classical pianist.

== Life ==
He was educated at the Albany Academy, the Fessenden School, Boston University and the University of Paris.

Career

Ackerman began his career with the Albany, N.Y. Times-Union, but has lived and worked for most of his life in Europe, where he has reported and written for major American print and broadcast media, notably Time, Life, Sports Illustrated, and Newsweek magazines, CBS News, ABC News and UPI. He was Chief Paris Correspondent for the Westinghouse Broadcasting Corporation before joining the Paris Bureau of Time-Life as a correspondent and writer, in 1959. He reported throughout Europe and Africa for all of the Time Inc. publications, as well as for Paris-Match, a leading weekly French magazine. He was, briefly, an editor at People magazine in New York.

Ackerman reported major news events in Europe and North Africa in the 1950s and ‘60s. He was the first American newsman to arrive in Agadir, Morocco, on February 29, 1960, following the earthquake in which 30,000 people were killed and injured, and he witnessed the street battles between French infantrymen and civilians in Algiers in 1961 that heralded the end of the Franco-Algerian War.

In the late 1980s, Ackerman carried out reporting assignments in Eastern Europe for Pierre Salinger, European News Director of ABC News and former press secretary to President John F. Kennedy. In 1989, on assignment for Salinger, Ackerman entered the former German Democratic Republic (East Germany) posing as a university professor. Arrested by the East German secret police, the Stasi, Ackerman was released after convincing the police that he was a close friend of East German chief of state Erich Honecker. He continued reporting, and clandestinely filmed massive public demonstrations in Leipzig and Berlin that preceded the collapse of the Communist government and the fall of the Berlin Wall. The films, as well as the motorcyclist Ackerman hired to smuggle them out of the country, were intercepted and seized, probably by the Stasi, before reaching West Berlin.

On the night of November 9, 1989, with East Germany falling rapidly into anarchy, Ackerman and another correspondent became the first newsmen to reach the Brandenburg Gate as jubilant crowds of West and East Germans ripped down the first sections of the Wall and tearfully embraced.

Ackerman’s war reporting is included in a book collection edited by Life magazine photographer Carl Mydans, entitled The Violent Peace, published by Atheneum. A collection of his short fiction, Eleven Stories, was published in 1964.

Ackerman’s writing and reporting are in permanent collection at the University of Wyoming and the American Heritage Foundation. His art photography has been exhibited in galleries and museums in Europe and the United States, and acquired by, among others, the Albany Institute of History and Art. His last novel, Raging Light, was published as an e-book on Amazon in September, 2013.

== Personal life ==
Ackerman has two children, and resides in upstate New York and divides his time between the U. S. and Europe.
