= Tom Ackerman (basketball) =

American basketball player

Personal information
- Born: Elm Grove, West Virginia, U.S.
- Listed height: 5 ft 6 in (1.68 m)
- Listed weight: 170 lb (77 kg)

Career information
- High school: Triadelphia (Wheeling, West Virginia)
- College: West Liberty (1950–1952, 1954–1956)
- NBA draft: 1952: 4th round
- Drafted by: Minneapolis Lakers
- Position: Guard
- Coaching career: 1969–1992

Career history

Coaching
- 1969–1975; 1987–1992: West Liberty

Career highlights
- 3× First-team All-WVIAC (1952, 1955, 1956)
- Stats at Basketball Reference

Career coaching record
- College: 101–200 (.336)

Thomas L. Ackerman is an American former basketball player and coach. He played college basketball as a guard for the West Liberty State Hilltoppers and was a three-time All-West Virginia Intercollegiate Athletic Conference (WVIAC) selection. He also played baseball and golf for the Hilltoppers and was the only athlete to be named to the All-WVIAC team in three sports.

Ackerman attended Triadelphia High School in Wheeling, West Virginia. He made his first All-WVIAC basketball team for the Hilltoppers in 1952. He was selected by the Minneapolis Lakers in the 1952 NBA draft but he enlisted into the United States Army for the Korean War. Ackerman returned to West Liberty in 1954 to continue his athletic career and was named to the All-WVIAC basketball teams in 1955 and 1956. Ackerman served as head coach of the Hilltoppers men's basketball team from 1969 to 1975 and 1987 to 1992 and amassed a 101–200 record over eleven seasons.

Ackerman was inducted into the West Liberty Athletics Hall of Fame in 1982.
