= John William Ackerman =

South African politician

Sir John William Ackerman, KCMG, (1825–1905) was mayor of Pietermaritzburg and, for twelve years, speaker of the Natal Legislative Council.

Ackerman is buried at City of Westminster Cemetery, Hanwell.

== See also ==
- List of mayors of Pietermaritzburg
- Timeline of Pietermaritzburg
