= Ralph Ackerman =

American artist

Ralph Ackerman (May 8, 1941 - July 7, 2008) was a photographer, independent filmmaker, producer, traveler, active documentarian, anti-war activist and lecturer. Ackerman is best remembered for his photographic exhibition at the 1969 Woodstock music festival.

== Biography ==
Ackerman displayed the only photography exhibit on an outlying fence at the original 1969 "Woodstock", which was booked to be an Arts and Music festival. He was photographer for the 60's publication, the ORACLE published by Allan Cohen. He also produced and developed "Fashion Video Magazine" and the "Fashion Video Awards".

Ackerman suffered complications from throat cancer, which was in remission, but eventually died from kidney failure while working in his studio in the Chelsea Art District in New York.

He had just returned from L.A. in the process of working on producing an Independent documentary on the history of the DJ in Hip-Hop while at the same time social engineering media development deals during the Digital Hollywood conference. From LA he headed back to New York for one day before departing to Cannes, France where he founded and ran the Film Producers Intensive program, "The Film Program Cannes" with professor, Robert Nickson of NYU's Graduate Film Program.

He has left behind a collection of historical photographs, films and videos documenting artists, musicians, activists, and people from many backgrounds from the '60's through to 2008.
