= Marta Cunningham =

American singer

- Born: December 1869; Brazos County, Texas, United States
- Died: June 25, 1937 (aged 67)
- Genres: opera
- Instrument: soprano

Marta Cunningham CBE (December 1869 – June 25, 1937) was an American-born European-based soprano.

Born in 1869 in Brazos County, Texas, United States, her parents were Albert Baxter and Martha Minerva Tharp Cunningham, both from DeSoto Parish, Louisiana. Marta was educated to high school level at the Convent of Notre Dame in Baltimore.

She then immigrated to the United Kingdom, where she trained classically, making her debut as a soprano soloist at the coronation of King Edward VII in 1901. She then made regular tours of England, Ireland and the United States, until taking up a residency at Claridges Hotel, London, from 1910 until 1912, presenting "matinees musicales."

At the outbreak of World War I she resided in London, undertaking charity and canteen work in the East End. In 1919, while visiting her local hospital, Cunningham asked the matron if she still had any wounded servicemen under treatment. Horrified to be given the answer 600, Cunningham discovered there were thousands of wounded men lying in hospitals, bored, lonely, and in pain. Cunningham established The Not Forgotten Association, with the object of providing entertainment and recreation for the war crippled that would alleviate the tedium of their lives and give them something to which they could look forward. Through her royal connections, Cunningham persuaded Princess Mary to become the Association's first patron, a position she held until her death in 1965. Cunningham devoted the rest of her life to the charity, for which in 1929 she was appointed a CBE.

Cunningham died on June 25, 1937.
