= Boundary-Layer Meteorology =

- Discipline: Meteorology
- Language: English
- Edited by: E. Fedorovich, W. Anderson

Publication details
- History: 1970–present
- Publisher: Springer Science+Business Media
- Frequency: Monthly
- Impact factor: 2.949 (2020)

Standard abbreviations
- ISO 4: Bound.-Layer Meteorol.

Indexing
- CODEN: BLMEBR
- ISSN: 0006-8314 (print); 1573-1472 (web)
- LCCN: 76016654
- OCLC no.: 1536930

Links
- Journal homepage

Boundary-Layer Meteorology is a monthly peer-reviewed scientific journal published by Springer Science+Business Media. It was established in 1970 by R. E. Munn (University of Toronto). The current editors-in-chief are Evgeni Fedorovich (University of Oklahoma) and William Anderson (University of Texas at Dallas). According to the Journal Citation Reports, the journal has a 2020 impact factor of 2.949. It covers fundamental research on physical, chemical, and biological processes occurring within the atmospheric boundary layer, the lowest few kilometres of the Earth's atmosphere.
