= Pietermaritzburg Italian P.O.W. Church =

Church in Pietermaritzburg, South Africa

Coordinates: 29°38′10″S 30°24′44″E

The Pietermaritzburg Italian P.O.W. Church is a provincial heritage site in Pietermaritzburg in the KwaZulu-Natal province of South Africa.

In 1977 it was described in the Government Gazette as

The church was erected in 1944 by Italian prisoners of war of Camp 4, situated in the outskirts of Pietermaritzburg, and is still used by the Italian community. It is closely associated with the history of the Italian community in South Africa.

== See also ==
- Italian Chapel
- Prisoner of war
- Italian South Africans
