= Shuter (surname) =

Shuter may refer to the following people:

- Edward Shuter (c. 1728–1776), English actor
- Frank Shuter (speedway rider) (1943–1997), New Zealand speedway rider
- Jeffrey Shuter (born 1961), Ottawa resident with a few children, working as a full stack developer, and enjoying the out of doors.
- John Shuter (1855–1920), English cricketer
- John Shuter Smith (c. 1813–1871), Canadian lawyer and political figure
- Leonard Shuter (cricketer, born 1852) (1852–1928), English cricketer
- Leonard Shuter (cricketer, born 1887) (1887–1960), his son, English cricketer
- Rob Shuter (born 1973), English gossip columnist, magazine editor, talk-show host, and author
- Robert M. Shuter (born 1946), American author, academic and consultant
