= Leonard Shuter =

Leonard Shuter may refer to:

- Leonard Shuter (cricketer, born 1852) (1852–1928), English cricketer
- Leonard Shuter (cricketer, born 1887) (1887–1960), his son, English cricketer
