= Shuter =

Shuter may refer to

- Shuter (surname)
- Shuter House in South Africa
- Shuter & Shooter Publishers based in South Africa
