= List of heritage sites in Pietermaritzburg =

This is a list of the heritage sites in Pietermaritzburg as recognized by the South African Heritage Resources Agency.

| SAHRA identifier | Site name | Description | Town | District | NHRA status | Coordinates | Image |
|---|---|---|---|---|---|---|---|
| 9/2/436/0001/001 | Fort Napier, Devonshire Road, Pietermaritzburg: Officers' Mess | One-and-a-half storeyed building of rectangular form with a steeply pitched corrugated iron roof; fu Officers' Mess of military headquarters for Imperial troops in Natal from 1843 to 1914, includes both B Type of site: Mess Previous use: mess. Current use: residence. Head up Loop St (one-way) turn left in Edendale Rd at T and first right under railway into Devnoshire. Part of military headquarters for Imperial troops in Natal 1843–1914. This building is probably one...? seems cut off | Pietermaritzburg, Napierville | Pietermaritzburg | Provincial Heritage Site | 29°37′00″S 30°22′00″E | Upload Photo |
| 9/2/436/0001/002 | St George's Garrison Anglican Church, Fort Napier, Devonshire Road, Pietermaritzburg | Red brick building built in the Gothic style with mouldings in the brickwork. Has a front and rear f This little military church is situated at Fort Napier on the hill to the west of Pietermaritzburg. The garrison at Fort Napier had no church of their own for fifty years and had to attend services either in the open air at the fort or in the old Drill Ha Type of site: Church Current use: church. Head up Loop St (one-way) turn left in Edendale Rd at T and first right under railway into Devnoshire. Historical and architectural- This building is of significance in terms of its architecture, environ...? seems cut off | Pietermaritzburg, Napierville | Pietermaritzburg | Provincial Heritage Site | 29°36′46″S 30°22′14″E | Red brick building built in the Gothic style with mouldings in the brickwork. Has a front and rear f This little military church is situated at Fort Napier on the hill to the west of Pietermaritzburg. The garrison at Fort Napier had no church of their own for fifty years and had to attend services either in the open air at the fort or in the old Drill Ha Type of site: Church Current use: church. Head up Loop St (one-way) turn left in Edendale Rd at T and first right under railway into Devnoshire. Historical and architectural- This building is of significance in terms of its architecture, environ...? seems cut off |
| 9/2/436/0001/004 | Fort Napier, Devonshire Road, Pietermaritzburg: Historic Core | Fort Napier was established in 1843 by a small British force. Within two years permanent buildings h Type of site: Fort Previous use: other: various. Current use: other: medical residential facilities. The various buildings of Fort Napier, including one of the original bastions of the old fort and...? | Pietermaritzburg, Napierville | Pietermaritzburg | Provincial Heritage Site | 29°36′47″S 30°22′08″E | Upload Photo |
| 9/2/436/0002 | City Hall, 260 Commercial (Cnr Church) Road, Pietermaritzburg | Multi-storeyed red brick building with roof of copper and corrugated iron. Plastered mouldings and f The Pietermaritzburg City Hall stands in Commercial Street, between Church and Longmarket Streets. It occupies the site where the Voortrekkers built the 'Volksraadsaal' or National Council Chamber of the Republic of Natalia. The 'Volksraadsaal' was commen Architectural style: Flemish Renaissance Style. Type of site: City Hall Current use: city hall. The City Hall has great historical and architectural importance, is a work of a recognised master an... | Pietermaritzburg, Central | Pietermaritzburg | Provincial Heritage Site | 29°36′05″S 30°22′47″E | Multi-storeyed red brick building with roof of copper and corrugated iron. Plastered mouldings and f The Pietermaritzburg City Hall stands in Commercial Street, between Church and Longmarket Streets. It occupies the site where the Voortrekkers built the 'Volksraadsaal' or National Council Chamber of the Republic of Natalia. The 'Volksraadsaal' was commen Architectural style: Flemish Renaissance Style. Type of site: City Hall Current use: city hall. The City Hall has great historical and architectural importance, is a work of a recognised master an... Media related to Pietermaritzburg Town Hall at Wikimedia Commons |
| 9/2/436/0004 | Old Pentrich Railway Station, Woods Road, Pietermaritzburg | Type of site: Railway Station Previous use: station. Current use: house. From CBD take West St towards Durban. Becomes Camps Drift Road. At T right into Alexandra Rd. Cross. One of the oldest NGR station buildings in Natal. | Pietermaritzburg, Mason's Mill | Pietermaritzburg | Provincial Heritage Site | 29°38′27″S 30°22′11″E | Upload Photo |
| 9/2/436/0005-002 | 12 Oxford Street, Central, Pietermaritzburg | A double storey twin gable fronted house with corrugated iron roof, painted brick walls with express Type of site: House Current use: house. The building has architectural merit and is part of a grouping of architectural merit, over eighty y | Pietermaritzburg, Central | Pietermaritzburg | Heritage Register (KZN Heritage Act) | 30°22′07″S 29°36′10″E | Upload Photo |
| 9/2/436/0005-005 | 121 Loop (Cnr Temple) Street, Central, Pietermaritzburg | This is a double storey Victorian Colonial verandah house. The roof is of corrugated iron with a mai Current use: office. The house both historical and architectural merit, it is a rare and outstanding example of its archi | Pietermaritzburg, Central | Pietermaritzburg | Heritage Register (KZN Heritage Act) | 30°22′34″S 29°36′28″E | Upload Photo |
| 9/2/436/0005-006 | 123 Loop Street, Central, Pietermaritzburg | A high character double storey Edwardian residence with a broseley tiled roof and well defined decor Architectural style: Edwardian Style. Type of site: House Current use: house. This house is considered to be of significant historical and architectural merit and is a particular...? seems cut off | Pietermaritzburg, Central | Pietermaritzburg | Heritage Register (KZN Heritage Act) | 30°22′34″S 29°36′28″E | Upload Photo |
| 9/2/436/0005-012 | 148 Loop Street, Central, Pietermaritzburg | An Early Settler single storey verandah cottage with metal tile roof partly replaced by corrugated i Type of site: House Current use: house. The house is of historical and architectural importance. It is over eighty years old, forms part of | Pietermaritzburg, Central | Pietermaritzburg | Heritage Register (KZN Heritage Act) | 30°22′38″S 29°36′27″E | Upload Photo |
| 9/2/436/0005-013 | Comrades House, 18 Connaught Road, Scottsville, Pietermaritzburg | | Pietermaritzburg, Scottsville | Pietermaritzburg | Heritage Register (KZN Heritage Act) | 30°23′43″S 29°36′51″E | Upload Photo |
| 9/2/436/0005-015 | Lister House, 36 Buckingham Avenue, Pietermaritzburg | | Pietermaritzburg, Scottsville | Pietermaritzburg | Heritage Register (KZN Heritage Act) | 30°23′16″S 29°37′21″E | |
| 9/2/436/0005-036 | Kensington, 359 Bulwer Street (cnr Boshoff Street), Pietermaritzburg | A large and imposing double storey residence, formerly the Gwalia Hotel, with recently added metal t Type of site: House Current use: house. This prominent house is a landmark in Pmb, commanding as it does the Boshoff Street entrance to the | Pietermaritzburg, Central | Pietermaritzburg | Heritage Register (KZN Heritage Act) | 30°23′18″S 29°36′13″E | Upload Photo |
| 9/2/436/0005-058 | 11 Carlyle (Cnr Chancery) Arcade, Central, Pietermaritzburg | A double storey office block with tiled roof, face brick plinth and plastered walls above and timber Type of site: commercial Current use: office. The building has architectural merit and is part of an architectural grouping, making a significant | Pietermaritzburg, Central | Pietermaritzburg | Heritage Register (KZN Heritage Act) | 30°22′42″S 29°36′11″E | Upload Photo |
| 9/2/436/0005-068 | 180 Loop Street, Central, Pietermaritzburg | A gable ended double storey Victorian town house, now converted to a restaurant. The roof is of corr Architectural style: Tudor Revival Style. Type of site: commercial Current use: office. This is a distinctive house of architectural importance and a rare and outstanding example of its ty | Pietermaritzburg, Central | Pietermaritzburg | Heritage Register (KZN Heritage Act) | 30°22′44″S 29°36′24″E | Upload Photo |
| 9/2/436/0005-073 | 202 Chapel Street, Central, Pietermaritzburg | | Pietermaritzburg, Central | Pietermaritzburg | Heritage Register (KZN Heritage Act) | 30°22′38″S 29°36′25″E | Upload Photo |
| 9/2/436/0005-087 | 25 Loop Street, Central, Pietermaritzburg | An imposing double storey residence with a gable turret on one corner (flanked by verandahson two si Type of site: House Current use: house. The house is of architectural importance and part of a grouping of architectural merit. It is more t | Pietermaritzburg, Central | Pietermaritzburg | Heritage Register (KZN Heritage Act) | 30°22′20″S 29°36′40″E | Upload Photo |
| 9/2/436/0005-089 | 270 Longmarket Street, Central, Pietermaritzburg | This building originally housed the City and Port Hotel. It is a simple double storey structure. The Architectural style is Cape Georgian Style. Type of site: commercial Current use: office. This building is of historical and architectural importance, as well as being over eighty years old | Pietermaritzburg, Central | Pietermaritzburg | Heritage Register (KZN Heritage Act) | 30°22′51″S 29°36′09″E | Upload Photo |
| 9/2/436/0005-091 | 278 Prince Alfred Street, Central, Pietermaritzburg | | Pietermaritzburg, Central | Pietermaritzburg | Heritage Register (KZN Heritage Act) | 30°23′07″S 29°36′19″E | Upload Photo |
| 9/2/436/0005-111 | 39-39A Henrietta Street, Central, Pietermaritzburg | | Pietermaritzburg, Central | Pietermaritzburg | Heritage Register (KZN Heritage Act) | 30°23′00″S 29°36′11″E | Upload Photo |
| 9/2/436/0005-115 | 4 McCullum Street, Central, Pietermaritzburg | | Pietermaritzburg, Central | Pietermaritzburg | Heritage Register (KZN Heritage Act) | 29°36′02″S 30°22′46″E | Upload Photo |
| 9/2/436/0005-116 | 4 Stranack Street, Central, Pietermaritzburg | A single storey cottage with metal tiled saddle roof, red brick walls and timber framed sliding sash Type of site: House Current use: house. The cottage has architectural merit and is part of a grouping, over eighty years old, and makes a si | Pietermaritzburg, Central | Pietermaritzburg | Heritage Register (KZN Heritage Act) | 30°22′26″S 29°36′00″E | Upload Photo |
| 9/2/436/0005-123 | 420 Loop Street, Central, Pietermaritzburg | This is a high character cottage of great charm and quality. The glazed panelled entrance door is fl Type of site: House Current use: house. Dwelling of architectural importance, outstanding example of its type; over eighty years old and con | Pietermaritzburg, Central | Pietermaritzburg | Heritage Register (KZN Heritage Act) | 30°23′17″S 29°35′56″E | Upload Photo |
| 9/2/436/0005-126 | 431 Prince Alfred Street, Central, Pietermaritzburg | A single storey verandah house with prominent triangular front gable with neo-Gothic ventilator, cor Architectural style: Victorian Style. Type of site: House Current use: house. This house is of architectural importance and forms part of a grouping of architectural merit. It is | Pietermaritzburg, Central | Pietermaritzburg | Heritage Register (KZN Heritage Act) | 30°23′24″S 29°36′01″E | Upload Photo |
| 9/2/436/0005-130 | 5 Hillside Road, Prestbury, Pietermaritzburg | | Pietermaritzburg, Prestbury | Pietermaritzburg | Heritage Register (KZN Heritage Act) | 30°20′58″S 29°36′23″E | Upload Photo |
| 9/2/436/0005-164 | 46 Braid Street, Central, Pietermaritzburg | A double storey gable fronted house with a corrugated iron roof, face brick walls and timber framed Type of site: House Current use: house. The house has architectural merit and is part of an architectural grouping, over eighty years old, a | Pietermaritzburg, Central | Pietermaritzburg | Heritage Register (KZN Heritage Act) | 30°23′13″S 29°36′23″E | Upload Photo |
| 9/2/436/0005-165 | Barclays Bank, 207 Church (Cnr Bank) Street, Pietermaritzburg | Distinctive double storey bank premises with tiled roof, red brick walls and stone quoin. The building Architectural style: Classical Revival Style. Type of site: Bank Current use: office. The site of this building has been used continuously for banking purposes since the 1850s. The site and | Pietermaritzburg, Central | Pietermaritzburg | Heritage Register (KZN Heritage Act) | 30°22′36″S 29°36′11″E | Upload Photo |
| 9/2/436/0005-192 | Greene's Chambers, 27 Chancery Lane (cnr Change Lane), Pietermaritzburg | A double storey office block in the Renaissance Revival style with a concealed corrugated iron roof, Architectural style: Renaissance Revival Style. Type of site: commercial Current use: office. The building has architectural and historical merit and is a rare outstanding example of its type. I | Pietermaritzburg, Central | Pietermaritzburg | Heritage Register (KZN Heritage Act) | 30°22′43″S 29°36′10″E | Upload Photo |
| 9/2/436/0005-198 | House Ripkin, 428 Longmarket Street, Pietermaritzburg | A 1 1/2-storey house, originally with dormer windows under thatch. It is one of the oldest Type of site: House Current use: house. This house is of considerable historical and architectural merit, and a rare and outstanding example | Pietermaritzburg, Central | Pietermaritzburg | Heritage Register (KZN Heritage Act) | 30°23′13″S 29°35′52″E | Upload Photo |
| 9/2/436/0005-200 | Ketelfontein, 231 Old Howick Road, Pietermaritzburg | | Pietermaritzburg, Worlds View | Pietermaritzburg | Heritage Register (KZN Heritage Act) | 30°18′57″S 29°34′20″E | Upload Photo |
| 9/2/436/0005-246 | 412 Longmarket St, Central, Pietermaritzburg | A single storey early Voortrekker cottage, considerably altered, with corrugated iron roof, plastere Type of site: House Current use: house. The house is of considerable historical and architectural importance and is a rare example of its ty | Pietermaritzburg, Central | Pietermaritzburg | Heritage Register (KZN Heritage Act) | 30°23′10″S 29°35′53″E | Upload Photo |
| 9/2/436/0005-289 | 11 Burger (Cnr Pine) Street, Central, Pietermaritzburg | A single storey gable fronted house with verandah on two sides, half-hipped corrugated iron roof and Type of site: House Current use: house. The house has architectural merit in that it is a good example of the Pmb red brick verancular, is ov | Pietermaritzburg, Central | Pietermaritzburg | Pending (Register) | 30°22′23″S 29°36′46″E | Upload Photo |
| 9/2/436/0006 | Overpark, 122 Loop Street, Pietermaritzburg | The front entrance of the house is closed by an e high teak Victorian door with coloured glass middle panels. The doorway gives into a short, high passage and this in turn brings the visitor into a hallway of considerable width, running the entire length Overpark is a fine Victorian verandah house in the Natal style. It was built in 1884 for a wealthy merchant in Pietermaritzburg and reflects his wealth in its size and quality of its architectural detailing as well as in the opulence of its interiors. Architectural style: Gothic Revival Style. Type of site: commercial Previous use: house. Current use: office. Turn into Loop Street (one-way) from Chapel Street. Building is on left just of end of redbrick wall. Overpark House, with its beautiful cast-iron trimmings and cast-iron fireplaces, dates from 1884 and is an excellent example of a Victorian veranda house in the Natal style. | Pietermaritzburg, Central | Pietermaritzburg | Provincial Heritage Site | 30°22′36″S 29°36′30″E | The front entrance of the house is closed by an e high teak Victorian door with coloured glass middle panels. The doorway gives into a short, high passage and this in turn brings the visitor into a hallway of considerable width, running the entire length Overpark is a fine Victorian verandah house in the Natal style. It was built in 1884 for a wealthy merchant in Pietermaritzburg and reflects his wealth in its size and quality of its architectural detailing as well as in the opulence of its interiors. Architectural style: Gothic Revival Style. Type of site: commercial Previous use: house. Current use: office. Turn into Loop Street (one-way) from Chapel Street. Building is on left just of end of redbrick wall. Overpark House, with its beautiful cast-iron trimmings and cast-iron fireplaces, dates from 1884 and is an excellent example of a Victorian veranda house in the Natal style. |
| 9/2/436/0007 | Shuter House, 381 Longmarket Street, Pietermaritzburg | A single storey house with a verandah on three sides and a broseley tiled pyramid roof. The plastere This house is the work of the Architect Phillip Dudgeon. Type of site: House Current use: house. From City Hall Building take left down Longmarket Street and cross Boshoff street. Shuter House is o. This is one of the most important houses in the City from an architectural point of view, a rare exa | Pietermaritzburg, Central | Pietermaritzburg | Provincial Heritage Site | 30°23′05″S 29°35′54″E | Upload Photo |
| 9/2/436/0008 | The Property Shop, 120 Chapel (Cnr Pietermaritz) Street, Pietermaritzburg | Double storey premises with shop at ground floor level and dwelling above, and with corrugated iron Architectural style: Tudor Revival Style. Type of site: commercial Current use: office. The corner building is a Pietermaritzburg landmark. It is of considerable significance from an archi | Pietermaritzburg, Central | Pietermaritzburg | Pending (Register) | 29°36′14″S 30°22′27″E | Upload Photo |
| 9/2/436/0009 | Old Supreme Court, College Road, Pietermaritzburg | Type of site: Courthouse Previous use: supreme court. Current use: offices. The history of the Old Supreme Court is inextricably linked to the legal system at it applied to Bla | Pietermaritzburg, Pelham | Pietermaritzburg | Provincial Heritage Site | 29°36′53″S 30°22′41″E | Type of site: Courthouse Previous use: supreme court. Current use: offices. The history of the Old Supreme Court is inextricably linked to the legal system at it applied to Bla |
| 9/2/436/0010 | Old Government House, 1 Longmarket Street, Pietermaritzburg | Double storey brick building with broseley tiled roof. Shale stone walls, with ventilated gables. Th The former Government House stands in Longmarket Street, between Fleming and Pine Streets, near the railway station. It is now one of the buildings of a Training College for teachers. In early times officials, even including the Lieutenant- Governor of th Type of site: Government House Previous use: offices & other: official residence. Current use: college. Head up Loop Street (one-way) turn right into Pine Street, just before T, and cross next T on Longmar. Historical and architectural-Was the home of Lieutenant-Governor of Natal, Benjamin Pine. | Pietermaritzburg, Central | Pietermaritzburg | Provincial Heritage Site | 30°22′51″S 29°36′09″E | Double storey brick building with broseley tiled roof. Shale stone walls, with ventilated gables. Th The former Government House stands in Longmarket Street, between Fleming and Pine Streets, near the railway station. It is now one of the buildings of a Training College for teachers. In early times officials, even including the Lieutenant- Governor of th Type of site: Government House Previous use: offices & other: official residence. Current use: college. Head up Loop Street (one-way) turn right into Pine Street, just before T, and cross next T on Longmar. Historical and architectural-Was the home of Lieutenant-Governor of Natal, Benjamin Pine. |
| 9/2/436/0011 | Colonial Building, Old Umgeni Magistrate's Court and Old Police Quarters, 241 Church (Gallwey and Pietermaritz) Street, Pietermaritzburg | A three-storey structure on the Church Street facade extending down Gallwey Lane becoming a double s The building was commenced in 1895 to house the Natal Colonial Government departments and completed Architectural style: Renaissance Style. Type of site: Courthouse Current use: Natal Museum offices. Walk up pedestrianised section of Church Street from the City Hall. Colonial Building is third on Ri. Historical and architectural- Built in the Late English Renaissance-Georgian Revival style | Pietermaritzburg, Central | Pietermaritzburg | Provincial Heritage Site | 30°22′42″S 29°36′07″E | A three-storey structure on the Church Street facade extending down Gallwey Lane becoming a double s The building was commenced in 1895 to house the Natal Colonial Government departments and completed Architectural style: Renaissance Style. Type of site: Courthouse Current use: Natal Museum offices. Walk up pedestrianised section of Church Street from the City Hall. Colonial Building is third on Ri. Historical and architectural- Built in the Late English Renaissance-Georgian Revival style |
| 9/2/436/0012 | Old Merchiston School Boarding Hostel, 231 Prince Alfred Street, Pietermaritzburg | Type of site: School Previous use: hostel. Current use: offices and gymnasium. | Pietermaritzburg, Central | Pietermaritzburg | Register | 30°23′01″S 29°36′22″E | Upload Photo |
| 9/2/436/0014 | Alexandra Road Police Station, Alexandra (Cnr Lindup) Road, Pietermaritzburg | Double storey red-brick building with corrugated iron roof. Central entrance and end gables face to Built as barracks for the Natal Mounted Police, from 1894 known as the Natal Police. About 1921 it b Type of site: Police Station Current use: police station. From CBD take Commercial Rd towards Durban. At end of Alexandra Park right into Alexandra Road along. This architecturally interesting building was the headquarters of the Natal Mounted Police, later kn | Pietermaritzburg, Scottsville | Pietermaritzburg | Provincial Heritage Site | 29°37′09″S 30°23′17″E | Upload Photo |
| 9/2/436/0016 | Italian P.O.W. Church, Epworth Road, Pietermaritzburg | Single storey church building of square form. Main roof has Marseilles tiles while the tower has a b The church was erected in 1944 by Italian prisoners of war of Camp 4, situated in the outskirts of Pietermaritzburg, and is still used by the Italian community. It is closely associated with the history of the Italian community in South Africa. Architectural style: Neo-Classical. Type of site: Church Current use: religious. From CBD take Commercial Rd to Durban. At traffic light before motorway turn right and immeidiate le. Of architectural and historical interest – The Italian POW Church was built in 1944 by Italian priso | Pietermaritzburg, Epworth | Pietermaritzburg | Provincial Heritage Site | 29°38′04″S 30°24′38″E | Upload Photo |
| 9/2/436/0017 | Scottsville Primary School, King Edward Avenue, Pietermaritzburg | Single storey building of longitudinal form. The slate roof is of flat red clay tiles. The walls are Was PMBurg`s first primary school. The Scottsville school buildings were the last such buildings to Type of site: School Current use: school. From CBD take Commercial Rd towards Durban. At nedbank Plaza Shopping Centre turn left into King Edw. First primary school in Pietermaritzburg; an outstanding complex of redbrick buildings in the 'colle | Pietermaritzburg, Scottsville | Pietermaritzburg | Provincial Heritage Site | 29°36′55″S 30°24′00″E | Upload Photo |
| 9/2/436/0018 | Old Harward Boys School, Havelock Road, Pietermaritzburg | Single storeyed Edwardian building of longitudinal form. It has a shingled, faceted roof, the main r Built c1910 as the Harward Boys' School, the building was later used by the College for Further Trai Architectural style: Edwardian. Type of site: School Previous use: school & college. Current use: other: school of music. Head up Pietermaritz Street (one-way) After crossing Pine Street, Pietermaritz becomes Havelock. Buil. Of architectural and local historical interest – An important landmark in Pietermaritzurg, it is a t | Pietermaritzburg, Central | Pietermaritzburg | Provincial Heritage Site | 29°36′32″S 30°22′00″E | Upload Photo |
| 9/2/436/0019 | Loop Street Police Station, Loop (Cnr Murray) Street, Pietermaritzburg | Multi-storeyed building with a concealed roof, walls of red brick and greystone, with pilasters and Originally built as offices for the Natal Government Railways, now the Local Headquarters of the Sou Architectural style: Late English Renaissance. Type of site: Police Station Previous use: offices. Current use: police station. Heading up Loop Street (one-way) from Commercial Road station is on right next door to Natal Museum.. Of architectural and local historical interest – a recognition of the architectural importance of a | Pietermaritzburg, Central | Pietermaritzburg | Provincial Heritage Site | 29°36′16″S 30°22′49″E | Upload Photo |
| 9/2/436/0021 | Tatham Art Gallery and Adjacent Gardens, Commercial Road, Pietermaritzburg | Double-storey court building with symmetrical arcaded front showing Romanesque influence. Four pavil The former Pietermaritzburg Supreme Court building now houses the Tatham Art Gallery. Architectural style: Renaissance, with Romanesque influence. Previous use: supreme court. Current use: art gallery & other: park. Opposite to City Hall'. Architectural and historical interest – Pietermaritzburg's former Supreme Court, an impressive faceb | Pietermaritzburg, Central | Pietermaritzburg | Provincial Heritage Site | 29°36′08″S 30°22′44″E | Double-storey court building with symmetrical arcaded front showing Romanesque influence. Four pavil The former Pietermaritzburg Supreme Court building now houses the Tatham Art Gallery. Architectural style: Renaissance, with Romanesque influence. Previous use: supreme court. Current use: art gallery & other: park. Opposite to City Hall'. Architectural and historical interest – Pietermaritzburg's former Supreme Court, an impressive faceb |
| 9/2/436/0022/001 | Old State Veterinary Laboratory: Allerton Laboratories, 458 Town Bush Road, Pietermaritzburg | Double-storey square facebrick building with pitched corrugated iron roof surmounted by a small squa Erected as a state laboratory after which it became offices for the Regional Director and State Vete Previous use: laboratory. Current use: offices. From CBD take Boshoff St towards Howick. Becomes Town Bush Valley Rd. Turn right into Allerton short. Erected as a laboratory for State veterinary services, by Dr Herbert Watkins-Pitchford, who with Pro | Pietermaritzburg, Chase Valley | Pietermaritzburg | Provincial Heritage Site | 30°21′33″S 29°34′26″E | Upload Photo |
| 9/2/436/0023 | 238 Boom Street, Central, Pietermaritzburg | Single storey cottage with saddle roof finished in broseley tile on street side, corrugated iron on This cottage is a very early dwelling and was built before 1876. It is one of the oldest remaining u Type of site: commercial Previous use: house. Current use: office. This house is of both national and local architectural and historical importance and is the only sur | Pietermaritzburg, Central | Pietermaritzburg | Provincial Heritage Site | 30°22′29″S 29°35′57″E | Upload Photo |
| 9/2/436/0024 | Christian Science Church, 204 Chapel (Cnr Loop) Street, Pietermaritzburg | A fine example of an Edwardian church, with a broseley tiled roof with dormer window and turret, red This imposing church building, with its Gothic and Romanesque features, was originally built in 1903/4 as a Congregational Church. The building was designed by the architects Stott and Kirby. Architectural style: Edwardian Style. Type of site: Church Current use: religious. Head along Chapel Street towards Scottsville/Durban (ie: SE). Church is on far left corner at inters. The church has architectural and historical merit, is a rare and outstanding example of its type, is | Pietermaritzburg, Central | Pietermaritzburg | Provincial Heritage Site | 30°22′40″S 29°36′25″E | Upload Photo |
| 9/2/436/0025 | Town Hill Hospital, Town Bush Valley (Cnr Hyslop) Road, Pietermaritzburg: Old Victorian and Old North Park Buildings | Type of site: Hospital Current use: mental hospital. From CBD take Boshof St towards Howick. Becomes Chatterton Rd then Town Bush Valley Road. Left before. Sensitively designed two core buildings of the old Town Hill Hospital complex, each an architectural | Pietermaritzburg, Athlone | Pietermaritzburg | Provincial Heritage Site | 29°35′21″S 30°22′17″E | Upload Photo |
| 9/2/436/0026 | Conservatoire de Hammerstein, 141 Alexandra Road, Pietermaritzburg | Double-storey square facebrick building, kitchen wing at the rear; double-volume timber verandah cha Built in the late 1800s and named after Oscar Hammerstein who was a relative of a former owner of this type of site: House Current use: house. From the CBD take commercial road and turn right to Alexandra Road. The conservatoire de Hammeritein is here. The building is a landmark and focal point on one of Pietermaritzburg's major suburban thoroughfares | Pietermaritzburg, Scottsville | Pietermaritzburg | Provincial Heritage Site | 30°23′14″S 29°37′17″E | Upload Photo |
| 9/2/436/0027 | Old YMCA Building, 195 Longmarket Street, Pietermaritzburg | This double-storeyed building strategically situated in Longmarket Street, was erected in the late 1890s as office accommodation. The building itself is of locally manufactured red brick with a steeply pitched slate roof which has a central gable formed Architectural style: Renaissance revival style. Type of site: YMCA Previous use: boarding house. Current use: offices. In Longmarket Street (one-way) on left between Chapel St and Commercial Rd. opposite intersection wit. This double-storeyed building, with its wood and cast-iron decorated verandah, dates from the 1890s. The building forms an integral part of facade of Longmarket Street. | Pietermaritzburg, Central | Pietermaritzburg | Provincial Heritage Site | 30°22′39″S 29°36′16″E | Upload Photo |
| 9/2/436/0031 | Old Longmarket Street Girls School, 351 Longmarket (Cnr Boshoff) Street, Pietermaritzburg | The Old Longmarket Street Girls' School is a double storey building of considerable character design. The Longmarket Street Girls' School building was erected between 1903 and 1911. The building shows a plurality or architectural styles and is a fine and rare example of a Victorian school building. Architectural style: Nineteenth century Classical revival style. Type of site: School Previous use: school. Current use: museum. Head down Longmarket St (one-way) and turn into parking lot for Vorrtrekker Museum on left just before. The Longmarket Street Girls' School building was erected between 1903 and 1911. The building shows a plurality or architectural styles and is a fine and rare example of a Victorian school building. | Pietermaritzburg, Central | Pietermaritzburg | Provincial Heritage Site | 29°35′58″S 30°23′04″E | The Old Longmarket Street Girls' School is a double storey building of considerable character design. The Longmarket Street Girls' School building was erected between 1903 and 1911. The building shows a plurality or architectural styles and is a fine and rare example of a Victorian school building. Architectural style: Nineteenth century Classical revival style. Type of site: School Previous use: school. Current use: museum. Head down Longmarket St (one-way) and turn into parking lot for Vorrtrekker Museum on left just before. The Longmarket Street Girls' School building was erected between 1903 and 1911. The building shows a plurality or architectural styles and is a fine and rare example of a Victorian school building. |
| 9/2/436/0032 | Macrorie House, 11 Loop (Cnr Pine) Street, Pietermaritzburg | Double storey detached house with broseley tiled roof and greystone walls with quoining in sections. After it was built it became the house of Bishop Macrorie. The house became dilapidated, as the year Type of site: House Previous use: house. Current use: museum. Turn into Loop Street (one-way) from West Street (or lower down). House is on right next major inters. Historical and Architectural | Pietermaritzburg, Central | Pietermaritzburg | Provincial Heritage Site | 30°22′19″S 29°36′41″E | Double storey detached house with broseley tiled roof and greystone walls with quoining in sections. After it was built it became the house of Bishop Macrorie. The house became dilapidated, as the year Type of site: House Previous use: house. Current use: museum. Turn into Loop Street (one-way) from West Street (or lower down). House is on right next major inters. Historical and Architectural |
| 9/2/436/0033 | Old Presbyterian Church, 248 Church Street, Pietermaritzburg | It is built in shale. The land on which the old Presbyterian Church was built, together with the adjoining plots, was a gift from the Government in 1851. This land was granted on condition that a clock was installed in the tower of the church. Building work on the church was c Architectural style: Gothic Revival Style. Type of site: Church Previous use: church. Current use: religious. On pedestrianised section of Church Street, first building on left waliking up from City Hall.. This church was erected between 1852 and 1854. The neo-Gothic tower dates from 1874, after which the church was enlarged in 1883. During the Zulu War in 1879 the church was converted into a fortified refuge. | Pietermaritzburg, Central | Pietermaritzburg | Provincial Heritage Site | 30°22′43″S 29°36′08″E | Upload Photo |
| 9/2/436/0034 | Old Satya Vardhak Sabha Crematorium, Cremorne Cemetery, Pietermaritzburg | The site consists of two structures, the first a small, 1920`s vernacular, waiting room for mourners. In 1928 the Satya Vardak Sabha was formed to promote the principles of hygiene and the philosophy of Type of site: Crematorium Current use: hindu temple. From CBD head down Church St towards Greytown. Becomes Old Greytown Rd. 2nd left after crossing moto. This building is an important landmark on one of Pietermaritzburg's major arterial roads. It is of h | Pietermaritzburg, Northdale | Pietermaritzburg | Provincial Heritage Site | 30°23′35″S 29°34′46″E | Upload Photo |
| 9/2/436/0042 | Old Natal Houses of Parliament, 245 Longmarket Street, Pietermaritzburg | These buildings not only symbolise the constitutional development of Natal but are representative of the architecture of public buildings of their period. In 1856 Natal became a separate colony and was given a system of representative government. At the head of the executive authority there was the Governor and an Executive Council of nominated officials, while the legislative authority was exercised by a L Architectural style: Queen Anne Revival Style. Type of site: Parliament Previous use: parliament. Current use: other: Parliament assembly hall & offices. Head down Longmarket Street (one-way) from Chapel Street. Buildings are last on left before reaching. The Old Legislative Assembly building was erected to house the Legislative Assembly when Natal was granted representative government. The foundation stone was laid on 21 June 1887, by the Governor, Sir A. E. Havelock, K.C.M.G. The Old Legislative Council | Pietermaritzburg, Central | Pietermaritzburg | Provincial Heritage Site | 29°36′12″S 30°22′45″E | These buildings not only symbolise the constitutional development of Natal but are representative of the architecture of public buildings of their period. In 1856 Natal became a separate colony and was given a system of representative government. At the head of the executive authority there was the Governor and an Executive Council of nominated officials, while the legislative authority was exercised by a L Architectural style: Queen Anne Revival Style. Type of site: Parliament Previous use: parliament. Current use: other: Parliament assembly hall & offices. Head down Longmarket Street (one-way) from Chapel Street. Buildings are last on left before reaching. The Old Legislative Assembly building was erected to house the Legislative Assembly when Natal was granted representative government. The foundation stone was laid on 21 June 1887, by the Governor, Sir A. E. Havelock, K.C.M.G. The Old Legislative Council |
| 9/2/436/0044 | Marian Villa, 282 Alexandra Road, Pietermaritzburg | Single storeyed residence with high, ventilated, broseley tiled roof; wide encaustic-tiled verandah Built for Dr Conrad Akerman. In 1962 a small chapel was fitted into the layout of the building for u Type of site: House Previous use: house. Current use: old age home. From CBD take West St towards Durban. At T left into Alexandra Rd. Pass Girls High School on right a. This magnificent manor-house was designed by well-known architect Clement Stott who later bought the | Pietermaritzburg, Pelham | Pietermaritzburg | Provincial Heritage Site | 30°23′00″S 29°37′46″E | Upload Photo |
| 9/2/436/0050 | Church of the Covenant, Church Street, Pietermaritzburg | Single storey building with plastered shale stone walls. Front and rear Cape Dutch gables added at l This remarkable little building which houses a unique collection of Voortrekker relics is situated in Church Street, below Market Square. When the Voortrekkers entered Natal from the Orange Free State in the beginning of 1837, they suffered dreadful disas Architectural style: Dutch-style building. Type of site: Church Previous use: church. Current use: museum. From Boshoff Street turn into Church Street, towards City Hall. Church is third structure on left.. Built in 1840 to honour a vow that they would build a church 'in honour of God should He grant them | Pietermaritzburg, Central | Pietermaritzburg | Provincial Heritage Site | 29°36′03″S 30°22′46″E | Single storey building with plastered shale stone walls. Front and rear Cape Dutch gables added at l This remarkable little building which houses a unique collection of Voortrekker relics is situated in Church Street, below Market Square. When the Voortrekkers entered Natal from the Orange Free State in the beginning of 1837, they suffered dreadful disas Architectural style: Dutch-style building. Type of site: Church Previous use: church. Current use: museum. From Boshoff Street turn into Church Street, towards City Hall. Church is third structure on left.. Built in 1840 to honour a vow that they would build a church 'in honour of God should He grant them |
| 9/2/436/0050/001 | Voortrekker Pulpit, Church of the Covenant, Church Street, Pietermaritzburg | When the Church of the Vow was built, it was necessary to make a new pulpit for it. It is said to have been made of various kinds of local timber by a carpenter C. H. Nagel with the assistance of C. Heine. According to a statement by Mary Lindley, it was Type of site: Pulpit. | Pietermaritzburg, Central | Pietermaritzburg | Heritage Object | | Upload Photo |
| 9/2/436/0051 | Publicity House, 117 Commercial (Cnr Longmarket) Street, Pietermaritzburg | Publicity House has a symmetrical facade with an imposing entrance portico at its centre. The roof of the portico is supported by columns in the Greek fashion. The front of the building is ornamented and has sliding sash windows, The iron latticework at t This building was designed by J.S. Brunskill for the Pietermaritzburg and Borough Police and was completed in 1884. The original building consisted of nine dormitory rooms for the staff, a dining room and eight cells on the Longmarket Street side of the b Architectural style: Renaissance style. Current use: offices. In the heart of the city is the only other structure in same block on same side of Commercial Road a. Together with the City Hall and other historical buildings in the vicinity such as the Supreme Court, Publicity House forms a unique historical and architectural group. | Pietermaritzburg, Central | Pietermaritzburg | Provincial Heritage Site | 30°22′40″S 29°36′00″E | Upload Photo |
| 9/2/436/0052 | Old Prison, 2 Burger (Cnr Pine and Edendale) Street, Pietermaritzburg | The entire gaol complex is surrounded by a high rusticated plastered wall. The entrance is defined b Type of site: Gaol Previous use: prison complex. Current use: other: community training centre. From CBD take commercial, pass longmarket and loop till you come to burger street, turn right and pa. This unusual building is one of the older surviving government buildings in Pietermaritzburg and has | Pietermaritzburg, Central | Pietermaritzburg | Provincial Heritage Site | 30°22′23″S 29°36′50″E | Upload Photo |
| 9/2/436/0053 | Main Post Office, 232 Longmarket Street, Pietermaritzburg | Civic building designed in the grand manner by Architect William Lucas for Sir Herbert Baker. A typi Opened in 1903 during Edwardian era. Architectural style: Edwardian Style. Type of site: Post Office Current use: post office. Heading down Longmarket Street (one-way) from Chapel Street, the Post Office is on left next door to. Landmark quality; historical and architectural importance; over eighty years old; outstanding example | Pietermaritzburg, Central | Pietermaritzburg | Provincial Heritage Site | 30°22′51″S 29°36′09″E | Civic building designed in the grand manner by Architect William Lucas for Sir Herbert Baker. A typi Opened in 1903 during Edwardian era. Architectural style: Edwardian Style. Type of site: Post Office Current use: post office. Heading down Longmarket Street (one-way) from Chapel Street, the Post Office is on left next door to. Landmark quality; historical and architectural importance; over eighty years old; outstanding example |
| 9/2/436/0054 | Butine House, 151 Pietermaritz Street, Pietermaritzburg | This imposing house is a double-storeyed building under corrugated iron roof with a rectangular turret room and pedimented side and front gables. The front facade is characterised by a fine balcony with original wrought-iron work of an elaborate late Vict Architectural style: Victorian and Classical revival style. Type of site: commercial Previous use: house. Current use: offices. Turn into Pietermaritz Street (one-way) from Chapel Street. House is on right a short way up and just. This property is not only an excellent example of Pietermaritzburg's Victorian architecture, but its fine quality Victorian front facade and elegant Italianate northern facade are unique and contribute materially to the creation of a nationally important | Pietermaritzburg, Central | Pietermaritzburg | Provincial Heritage Site | 30°22′25″S 29°36′15″E | Upload Photo |
| 9/2/436/0056 | Clark House and Victoria Hall, Maritzburg College, Pietermaritzburg | Clark House was erected in 1887 and the adjoining Victoria Hall in 1895. These buildings housed the original Pietermaritzburg High School. Clark House itself is built in the Neo-Gothic style and is one of the best-known school buildings in South Africa. Current use: college. From CBD take West Street towards Durban. After passing Alexandra Park turn first left into school.. Clark House was erected in 1887 and the adjoining Victoria Hall in 1895. These buildings housed the original Pietermaritzburg High School. Clark House itself is built in the Neo-Gothic style and is one of the best-known school buildings in South Africa. | Pietermaritzburg, Pelham | Pietermaritzburg | Provincial Heritage Site | 29°37′00″S 30°22′54″E | Upload Photo |
| 9/2/436/0057 | Girls' High School, Alexandra Road, Pietermaritzburg | The Main Building of the Girls' High School which is situated in Alexandra Road, Pietermaritzburg, is a double-storeyed red-brick building in the neo Classical style. The facade is composed of 3 main elements in the form of projecting rusticated bays. The Girls' High School first opened in the gracious home "Morningside", which the Administration had bought from Mr. Peter Davis, on 4 August 1920. Part of that lovely home is still evident in the old part of the Boarding establishment. Miss Charlotte Nor Type of site: School Previous use: school. Current use: school. From CBD take West St towards Durban. At T right into Alexandra Rd. School is on right almost immedi. This impressive group of buildings, erected in the neo-classical style, forms the nucleus of the Girls' High School that was opened on this site in the old manor-house, Morningside, on 4 August 1920. The latter building, although altered, still forms part | Pietermaritzburg, Pelham | Pietermaritzburg | Provincial Heritage Site | 29°37′28″S 30°23′06″E | Upload Photo |
| 9/2/436/0060 | Old Remedial Model Primary School, 310 Loop Street, Pietermaritzburg | Single storey; broseley tiled roofs; red brick walls; Neo-Gothic Revival style; flat arch-headed, ti First occupied by Maritzburg College, Natal`s first high school (originally Pietermaritzburg High Sc Architectural style: Neo-Gothic Revival style. Type of site: School Current use: college. Turn into Loop Street (one-way) from Boshoff. School is in mid-block on left after St Anne's Hospital. Of architectural and local historical interest – Example of high character Victorian school architect | Pietermaritzburg, Central | Pietermaritzburg | Provincial Heritage Site | 30°23′01″S 29°36′09″E | Upload Photo |
| 9/2/436/0061 | Old Natal University Central Block, King Edward Avenue, Pietermaritzburg | The foundation stone was laid on 1910-08-01 by the Earl of Connaught and the building was opened in Type of site: educational Current use: university block. From CBD take Commercial Rd towards Durban. At Nedbank Plaza shops turn right into King Edward Avenue. Of architectural and historical interest – This is the oldest building of the University of Natal, P | Pietermaritzburg, Scottsville | Pietermaritzburg | Provincial Heritage Site | 29°37′17″S 30°23′44″E | The foundation stone was laid on 1910-08-01 by the Earl of Connaught and the building was opened in Type of site: educational Current use: university block. From CBD take Commercial Rd towards Durban. At Nedbank Plaza shops turn right into King Edward Avenue. Of architectural and historical interest – This is the oldest building of the University of Natal, P |
| 9/2/436/0062 | Old St Mary's Anglican Church, Commercial (Cnr Burger) Road, Pietermaritzburg | This (or 'the original') church was built with funds raised by bishop Colenso. An identical church, Architectural style: Gothic Revival Style. Type of site: Church Previous use: church. Current use: religious. From City Hall head towards Durban on Commercial Road. Church is on far righthand corner of intersect. Historical interest – The church was built on the initiative of Bishop Colenso and opened for service | Pietermaritzburg, Central | Pietermaritzburg | Provincial Heritage Site | 29°36′19″S 30°22′57″E | Upload Photo |
| 9/2/436/0063 | Natal Botanical Gardens and Plane Tree Avenue, Pietermaritzburg | About 300m long and consists of 46 Trees. There is a bell at the top of Plane Avenue in the gardens. These botanical gardens, the original portion of which was established in 1870, consist of an exotic garden and an indigenous garden. The plane tree avenue of approximately 300 metres, which was planted in 1908, is a world-renowned sight and stretches mai Type of site: Botanical Garden, Avenue Current use: park. From the CBD take Pietermaritz St (one-way) turning right into Pine St and first left into Mayors Wal. Historical and panoramic; the Plane tree avenue is a world renowned site and stretches mainly through | Pietermaritzburg, Prestbury | Pietermaritzburg | Provincial Heritage Site | 29°36′27″S 30°20′47″E | About 300m long and consists of 46 Trees. There is a bell at the top of Plane Avenue in the gardens. These botanical gardens, the original portion of which was established in 1870, consist of an exotic garden and an indigenous garden. The plane tree avenue of approximately 300 metres, which was planted in 1908, is a world-renowned sight and stretches mai Type of site: Botanical Garden, Avenue Current use: park. From the CBD take Pietermaritz St (one-way) turning right into Pine St and first left into Mayors Wal. Historical and panoramic; the Plane tree avenue is a world renowned site and stretches mainly through |
| 9/2/436/0064 | Reid's Building, 214 Longmarket (Cnr Club) Street, Pietermaritzburg | Three-storeyed red-brick square building. Corrugated iron roof; flat, plain gable; timber framed cas Was known for many years as Reid`s cabinet works and was the first triple-storey business house in P Architectural style: Renaissance Revival Style. Type of site: industrial Previous use: factory. Current use: shop & other: bowling alley & gamesroom. On Longmarket Street, between Chapel Street and Commercial Road, this building is clearly visible. Of historical and architectural interest – The first three-storey business house in Pietermaritzburg | Pietermaritzburg, Central | Pietermaritzburg | Provincial Heritage Site | 29°36′15″S 30°22′44″E | Upload Photo |
| 9/2/436/0065 | Russell High School, 127 Berg (Cnr Chapel) Street, Pietermaritzburg | Double storey school in Classic Revival style with broseley tiled hipped roof with bargeboards. Wall The school was opened in 1873 with fifty three boys and one hundred and fifty nine girls and was known as the Girls' Model School. It was sited in Chapel Street, Pietermaritzburg. Due to the increase of pupils, it was soon found that a larger building was Architectural style: Late 19th century Classical Revival Style. Type of site: School Current use: school. From the CBD head along Chapel Street towards Howick (ie: NW). The school is on the far left hand cor. In 1941 this school, which was founded in 1879, was renamed the Russell High School, in honour of Robert Russell, Superintendent of Education from 1878 to 1903. This late-nineteenth-century building complex forms a unique historical and architectural group | Pietermaritzburg, Central | Pietermaritzburg | Provincial Heritage Site | 30°22′16″S 29°36′12″E | Upload Photo |
| 9/2/436/0066 | Sans Souci, 65 Trelawney Road, Pietermaritzburg | The entrance portico and pediments are German neoclassical and compare with the fashionable German buildings which were illustrated in the architectural magazines of the period. The portico is from the ground level by a curving staircase at each and which Originally the home of a Mr Harwin, after whom Harwin`s arcade is named. San Souci was designed in 1883 for Richard Harwin, a prominent businessman, by a German architect, Albert Halder. The aesthetic result is interesting as one has a house of Europea Type of site: House Current use: house. From CBD take West St towards Durban. Becomes Camps Drift Road. At T right into Alexandra Rd. Cross. Architectural- This Victorian Manor-House, as well as its beautiful landscaped garden, reflects the | Pietermaritzburg, Mason's Mill | Pietermaritzburg | Provincial Heritage Site | 30°22′56″S 29°38′22″E | The entrance portico and pediments are German neoclassical and compare with the fashionable German buildings which were illustrated in the architectural magazines of the period. The portico is from the ground level by a curving staircase at each and which Originally the home of a Mr Harwin, after whom Harwin`s arcade is named. San Souci was designed in 1883 for Richard Harwin, a prominent businessman, by a German architect, Albert Halder. The aesthetic result is interesting as one has a house of Europea Type of site: House Current use: house. From CBD take West St towards Durban. Becomes Camps Drift Road. At T right into Alexandra Rd. Cross. Architectural- This Victorian Manor-House, as well as its beautiful landscaped garden, reflects the Media related to Sans Souci, Pietermaritzburg at Wikimedia Commons |
| 9/2/436/0067 | Voortrekker House Museum, 333 Boom (Cnr Claybourne) Street, Pietermaritzburg | Double storeyed house of local shalestone with original thatched roof. Has timber door and casement Was granted to Petrus Gerhardus Pretorius on 1846-04-08. This double-storeyed building was probably erected in 1846 by the Voortrekker Petrus Gerhardus Pretorius. The building is a good example of Voortrekker architecture and is the oldest building in Pie Type of site: House Previous use: house. Current use: museum. Head towards Howick on Boshoff Street (ie:NW). Turn left into Berg Street. The house is on the right. Historical – was probably erected c1846 by the Voortrekker Petrus Gerhardus Pretorius. The building | Pietermaritzburg, Central | Pietermaritzburg | Provincial Heritage Site | 30°22′42″S 29°35′45″E | Double storeyed house of local shalestone with original thatched roof. Has timber door and casement Was granted to Petrus Gerhardus Pretorius on 1846-04-08. This double-storeyed building was probably erected in 1846 by the Voortrekker Petrus Gerhardus Pretorius. The building is a good example of Voortrekker architecture and is the oldest building in Pie Type of site: House Previous use: house. Current use: museum. Head towards Howick on Boshoff Street (ie:NW). Turn left into Berg Street. The house is on the right. Historical – was probably erected c1846 by the Voortrekker Petrus Gerhardus Pretorius. The building Media related to Voortrekker House Museum at Wikimedia Commons |
| 9/2/436/0068 | Old Voortrekker Road, World's View Road, Pietermaritzburg | An area approximately 60 feet wide and 600 feet long, running in a south easterley direction from this observation post bears the appropriate name of World's View and has a great attraction for the residents of Pietermaritzburg and for visitors from all over the country. World's View, however, is not only a natural monument, but also worth seeing from Current use: road. Head up Boshoff Street onto Old Howick Road travell several km till out of town. Turn onto World's V. Historical – A portion of the historic Voortrekkers road to Natal is preserved here. | Pietermaritzburg | Pietermaritzburg | Provincial Heritage Site | 29°35′00″S 30°19′50″E | An area approximately 60 feet wide and 600 feet long, running in a south easterley direction from this observation post bears the appropriate name of World's View and has a great attraction for the residents of Pietermaritzburg and for visitors from all over the country. World's View, however, is not only a natural monument, but also worth seeing from Current use: road. Head up Boshoff Street onto Old Howick Road travell several km till out of town. Turn onto World's V. Historical – A portion of the historic Voortrekkers road to Natal is preserved here. |
| 9/2/436/0069 | Wayland, 149 Pietermaritz Street, Pietermaritzburg | The front facade consisting of three bays, is characterised by a verandah with cast-iron balustrading, a small porch in. the Arts and Crafts style and decorative barge boarding on the eaves and verandah. The, facade of the projecting bay has half- round w This double-storeyed red brick Victorian gentlemen's residence dates from the 1890s. From 1967 to 1971 was utilised by the YMCA as a hostel., Since 1971, it was transferred to the present company, it has been converted into a luxurious residence for the m Architectural style: Victorian and late Edwardian Gothic Revival. Type of site: House Previous use: house. Current use: offices. Turn into Pietermaritz Street (one-way) from Chapel Street. The house is on the right shortly before. Forms an integral part of the historic facade of Pietermaritz Street which is one of the oldest stre | Pietermaritzburg, Central | Pietermaritzburg | Provincial Heritage Site | 30°22′23″S 29°36′14″E | Upload Photo |
| 9/2/436/0070 | Welverdient, Edendale, Pietermaritzburg | This house is the oldest known double-storeyed dwelling erected outside the Cape Colony. It was built about 1840 by the Voortrekker leader. General Andries Pretorius, who also constructed the historic mill and the water furrow on the site. After the prope Type of site: House Previous use: house. Current use: museum. Facing the Church of the Covenant from Church Street, this house is slightly further back. This house is the oldest known double-storeyed dwelling erected outside the Cape Colony. It was built about 1840 by the Voortrekker leader. General Andries Pretorius, who also constructed the historic mill and the water furrow on the site. After the prope | Pietermaritzburg, Edendale | Pietermaritzburg | Provisional Protection | 29°35′56″S 30°22′57″E | Upload Photo |
| 9/2/436/0071 | Dudgeon House, 385 Longmarket Street, Pietermaritzburg | A single storey verandah house with corrugated iron roof, plastered brick walls in simulated stone c was designed by Phillip Dudgeon, the architect of the Standard Bank and Clark House in Pietermaritzbu Type of site: commercial Current use: office. The house is of national historical and architectural importance. It is an outstanding example of it | Pietermaritzburg, Central | Pietermaritzburg | Provincial Heritage Site | 30°23′05″S 29°35′54″E | A single storey verandah house with corrugated iron roof, plastered brick walls in simulated stone c was designed by Phillip Dudgeon, the architect of the Standard Bank and Clark House in Pietermaritzbu Type of site: commercial Current use: office. The house is of national historical and architectural importance. It is an outstanding example of it |
| 9/2/436/0072-001 | 11 Leighton Street, Central, Pietermaritzburg | | Pietermaritzburg, Central | Pietermaritzburg | Heritage Register (KZN Heritage Act) | 30°22′38″S 29°36′29″E | Upload Photo |
| 9/2/436/0072-002 | 14 Leighton Street, Central, Pietermaritzburg | | Pietermaritzburg, Central | Pietermaritzburg | Heritage Register (KZN Heritage Act) | 30°22′38″S 29°36′29″E | Upload Photo |
| 9/2/436/0072-003 | 13 Leighton Street, Central, Pietermaritzburg | | Pietermaritzburg, Central | Pietermaritzburg | Heritage Register (KZN Heritage Act) | 30°22′39″S 29°36′29″E | Upload Photo |
| 9/2/436/0072-005 | 17 Leighton Street, Central, Pietermaritzburg | | Pietermaritzburg, Central | Pietermaritzburg | Heritage Register (KZN Heritage Act) | 30°22′41″S 29°36′30″E | Upload Photo |
| 9/2/436/0072-006 | 20 Leighton Street, Central, Pietermaritzburg | | Pietermaritzburg, Central | Pietermaritzburg | Heritage Register (KZN Heritage Act) | 30°22′38″S 29°36′30″E | Upload Photo |
| 9/2/436/0072-007 | 26 Leighton Street, Central, Pietermaritzburg | | Pietermaritzburg, Central | Pietermaritzburg | Heritage Register (KZN Heritage Act) | 30°22′39″S 29°36′31″E | Upload Photo |
| 9/2/436/0072-008 | 30 Leighton Street, Central, Pietermaritzburg | | Pietermaritzburg, Central | Pietermaritzburg | Heritage Register (KZN Heritage Act) | 30°22′40″S 29°36′31″E | Upload Photo |
| 9/2/436/0072-009 | 7 Leighton Street, Pietermaritzburg | A double storey gable fronted Edwardian house with metal tiled roof and red brick walls with a heavi Architectural style: Edwardian Style. Type of site: House Current use: house. The house has architectural and historical merit and is a rare and outstanding example of its type. | Pietermaritzburg, Central | Pietermaritzburg | Heritage Register (KZN Heritage Act) | 30°22′38″S 29°36′29″E | Upload Photo |
| 9/2/436/0073-001 | 126 Berg Street, Central, Pietermaritzburg | | Pietermaritzburg, Central | Pietermaritzburg | Heritage Register (KZN Heritage Act) | 30°22′19″S 29°36′14″E | Upload Photo |
| 9/2/436/0073-003 | 15A Deanery Lane, Central, Pietermaritzburg | | Pietermaritzburg, Central | Pietermaritzburg | Heritage Register (KZN Heritage Act) | 30°22′21″S 29°36′14″E | Upload Photo |
| 9/2/436/0073-004 | 12 Deanery Lane, Central, Pietermaritzburg | | Pietermaritzburg, Central | Pietermaritzburg | Heritage Register (KZN Heritage Act) | 30°22′20″S 29°36′15″E | Upload Photo |
| 9/2/436/0073-004 | 134 Berg Street, Central, Pietermaritzburg | | Pietermaritzburg, Central | Pietermaritzburg | Heritage Register (KZN Heritage Act) | 30°22′19″S 29°36′13″E | Upload Photo |
| 9/2/436/0073-005 | 11 Deanery Lane, Central, Pietermaritzburg | | Pietermaritzburg, Central | Pietermaritzburg | Heritage Register (KZN Heritage Act) | 30°22′20″S 29°36′13″E | Upload Photo |
| 9/2/436/0073-006 | 10 Deanery Lane, Central, Pietermaritzburg | | Pietermaritzburg, Central | Pietermaritzburg | Heritage Register (KZN Heritage Act) | 30°22′20″S 29°36′15″E | Upload Photo |
| 9/2/436/0073-007 | 14 Deanery Lane, Central, Pietermaritzburg | | Pietermaritzburg, Central | Pietermaritzburg | Heritage Register (KZN Heritage Act) | 30°22′20″S 29°36′16″E | Upload Photo |
| 9/2/436/0073-008 | 21 Deanery Lane, Central, Pietermaritzburg | | Pietermaritzburg, Central | Pietermaritzburg | Heritage Register (KZN Heritage Act) | 30°22′21″S 29°36′15″E | Upload Photo |
| 9/2/436/0073-009 | 17 Deanery Lane, Central, Pietermaritzburg | | Pietermaritzburg, Central | Pietermaritzburg | Heritage Register (KZN Heritage Act) | 30°22′21″S 29°36′15″E | Upload Photo |
| 9/2/436/0073-010 | 16 Deanery Lane, Central, Pietermaritzburg | | Pietermaritzburg, Central | Pietermaritzburg | Heritage Register (KZN Heritage Act) | 30°22′21″S 29°36′16″E | Upload Photo |
| 9/2/436/0073-011 | 13 Deanery Lane, Central, Pietermaritzburg | | Pietermaritzburg, Central | Pietermaritzburg | Heritage Register (KZN Heritage Act) | 30°22′20″S 29°36′14″E | Upload Photo |
| 9/2/436/0073-012 | 15 Deanery Lane, Central, Pietermaritzburg | | Pietermaritzburg, Central | Pietermaritzburg | Heritage Register (KZN Heritage Act) | 30°22′20″S 29°36′14″E | Upload Photo |
| 9/2/436/0074 | Acacia Tree, Parkside, Pietermaritzburg | This remarkable acacia tree stands in the attractive grounds of the Administrator's residence in Pietermaritzburg. This tree occupies a special place in the traditions of KwaZulu-Natal. After the establishment of the Republic of Natalia by the Voortrekker Type of site: Tree Previous use: tree. From CBD take West Street towards Durban (ie: SE). After passing Maritzburg College and at guard box. (unknown – old regional file missing) | Pietermaritzburg, Pelham | Pietermaritzburg | Provisional Protection | 29°36′38″S 30°22′42″E | Upload Photo |
| 9/2/436/0075 | One O'Clock Gun, 12Pr ML Naval Cannon, Pietermaritzburg | Type of site: Gun. This gun is a well known city landmark, with a significant, but little known history. Its declarati | Pietermaritzburg | Pietermaritzburg | Heritage Object | | Upload Photo |
| 9/2/436/0082 | Dorchester House, 190 Loop Street, Pietermaritzburg | L-shaped double storey villa, three gables with wood finials and fretwork, one chimney with corbelle The property dates back to 1877 when it was owned by a Johan Wicht; various owners since – Sir Henry Architectural style: Gothic Style. Type of site: House Previous use: house. Current use: offices. From CBD at City Hall travel down Commercial Road towards Durban, turn right into Loop Street, build. This building is a noted landmark and important essentially for its architectural qualities being on | Pietermaritzburg, Central | Pietermaritzburg | Provincial Heritage Site | 30°22′45″S 29°36′22″E | Upload Photo |
| 9/2/436/0083 | Norfolk Villa, 196 Loop Street, Pietermaritzburg | Rectangular double-storey villa, one gable with double vertical arched vents, two facebrick chimneys Earliest valuation 1877, subdivided 1892. Over the years the house changed various hands belonging t Architectural style: Villa. Type of site: House Previous use: house. Current use: offices. From the CBD take Commercial road to Longmarker street and turn left down Longmarket street till yo. This prominent building at various times the home of two prominent and high-ranking, Imperial militar | Pietermaritzburg, Central | Pietermaritzburg | Provincial Heritage Site | 30°22′46″S 29°36′22″E | Upload Photo |
| 9/2/436/0087 | 131 Pietermaritz (Cnr Deanery) Street, Central, Pietermaritzburg | This is one of the few remaining double storey houses which once formed part of an imposing section Type of site: House Previous use: house. Current use: office. This building was listed in terms of Clause 27 bis of the Draft Town Planning Scheme on 14 February | Pietermaritzburg, Central | Pietermaritzburg | Provincial Heritage Site | 30°22′22″S 29°36′16″E | Upload Photo |
| 9/2/436/0094 | The Grove, 29 Riverton Road, Pietermaritzburg | Type of site: House Current use: house. Among the few original surviving homesteads in the Scottsville area, an example of a suburban single storey residential house in colonial verandah style. The original symmetry of the house has been compromised by alteration but enough of the house survives | Pietermaritzburg, Scottsville | Pietermaritzburg | Register | 30°23′40″S 29°36′25″E | Upload Photo |
