= Albert Halder =

German architect (1855–1901)

Albert Hubert Halder
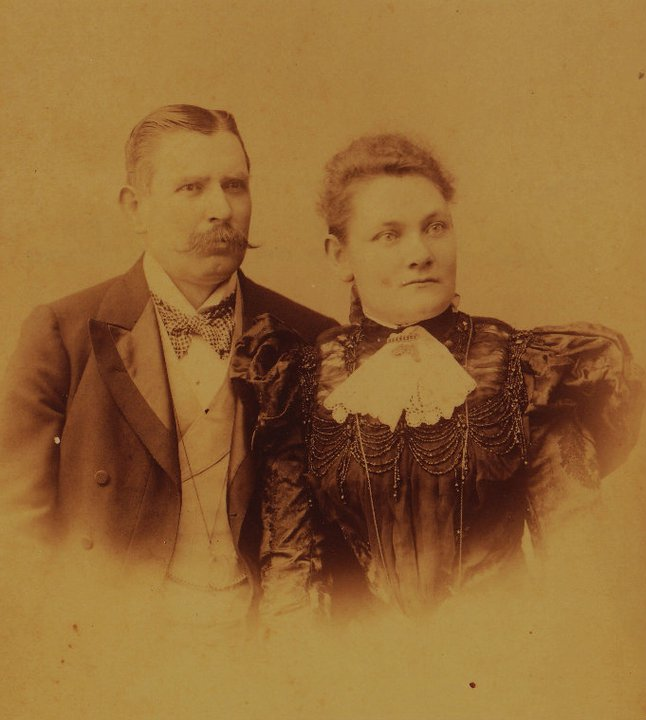
- Albert Hubert Halder and Wife Maria Whilhelmina Heine 1897
- Born: 9 October 1855; Beizkofen, Province of Hohenzollern, Kingdom of Prussia
- Died: 1901 (aged 45–46); London, England, U.K.
- Occupation: Architect
- Years active: 25
- Notable work: Sans Souci, Memorial Hospital building Bulawayo
- Spouse: Maria Whilhelmina Heine

Albert Hubert Halder (9 October 1855 – 1901) was a German architect, civil engineer and businessman who practiced in South Africa (Pietermaritzburg and Barberton) and in the then Rhodesia in Bulawayo. Halder was born in Beizkofen, Germany on 9 October 1855 and died in London, England in 1901.

== Early years in Germany ==
Halder grew up in the southern regions of Germany, At age 12 he attended Realschule, a technical high school, in Stuttgart, Germany. After high school, the next four years he attended multiple Polytechnic schools in Vienna, Stuttgart and Strasbourg, Germany. He eventually past the state examination in 1875 at Stuttgart. After graduation he got employed by the German State Railroads as well as serving one year in the German army as an engineer before beginning private practice in Stuttgart. (Note: According to his RIBA nomination papers, passed the German Staats Examen in architecture and art at the Polytechnikun in 1875.)

== Years in the Southern Africa ==
In about 1881 Halder had moved to the Colonybof Natal he practiced as an architect in Pietermaritzburg. It was here where he designed his best-known and probably best preserved house, Sans Souci (1883-1884). This home has an unusual classical portico ornamented with swags of fruit and flowers. It was among the few private houses illustrated in the 1906 book Twentieth Century Impressions of Natal.

Halder moved from Pietermaritzburg to Barberton In 1886, two years after gold was discovered there. At the time Barberton was part of the South African Republic. He got the job of government architect and was consulted by the board of the Barberton Hospital on the design of the new Hospital Building. During 1886 Halder perform the role as Chief Inspector for the construction of the railway line to the Transvaal. In December of that year Halder became a partner in the firm, R.A. Lavertine & A.H. Halder - architects and surveyors. The firm proposed plans to the city council for the new Dutch Reformed church that was to be built but did not get awarded the contract.

In 1888 Halder Held an appointment as claims inspector in the Barberton area. In December 1888 Halder was instructed by the Minister of Mines of the South African Republic (Transvaal) to collect mineral examples from the mines in the area for display at the Gold Fields stand at the Paris Exhibition of 1889. Halder became a fellow of the Royal Institute of British Architects and in August 1888 he became a corresponding member of the Imperial Institute of Civil Engineers and Architects of Vienna.

Halder left Barberton around the beginning of 1889 for the Witwatersrand, That year he traveled to Europe to attract investments for the Witwatersrand goldfields. He visited Antwerp, Amsterdam, Brussels, Berlin, Frankfurt, the Paris Exhibition, and Vienna including giving numerous lectures on South Africa specifically mining in the Transvaal before members of the Imperial Institute of Civil Engineers and Architects of Vienna. He returned to the Witwatersrand to represent several syndicates and private individuals.

Late 1890, Halder applied for the post of State Mining Engineer for the South African Republic but didn't get the position. This prompted him to leave the Witwatersrand and move to Pietersburg where he applied for naturalization as a citizen of the South African Republic. Halder then went onto Bulawayo where he designed the Memorial Hospital building in Jameson Street and a few office buildings. By 1897 he had returned to the witwatersrand and resided in Johannesburg where he wrote a paper "Mining in Rhodesia" that was published in the Transactions of the Institute of Mining Engineers (Newcastle upon Tyne, 1897, Vol. 13, pp. 609–611).

At around the turn of the century Halder moved to London where he remained until his death in 1901.

== Works ==
Building Name	Location	Year	Image (where available)
Memorial Hospital building	Bulawayo	1894	
Belhaven	Barberton	1904	Belhaeven House 1904
Globe Tavern	Barberton	1887	N/A
Lewis & Marks Building	Barberton	1887	Lewis & Marks Building
Villa Rose Mount	Pietermaritzburg	1884	N/A
Wykham Lodge	Pietermaritzburg	1884	N/A
House Harwin: Sans Souci	Pietermaritzburg	1883	San Souci
House RF Morcom	Pietermaritzburg	1882	N/A

== Notes and references ==
- Picton-Seymour, Désirée (1989). Historical Buildings in South Africa. Struikhof Publishers. ISBN 978-0-947458-01-0.
- Anon (1906). Twentieth Century Impressions of Natal: Its People, Commerce, Industries, and Resources. Lloyd's Greater Britain Publishing Company.
- Barberton Herald, 26 August 1887, Opening of the new hospital; 31 August 1888, Local and general.
- Cullingworth, J.M. Rapport van het Hospitaal te Barberton, 1890.
- Gold Fields News (Barberton), 28 July 1888, Barberton Association of Civil Engineers; 5 December 1888, Paris Exhibition; Extra of 7 August 1889, Mr A.H. Halder in Europe.
- Gold Fields Times (Barberton), 21 December 1886, [Notice] To builders.
- Hall, A.L. (1922). "A bibliography of South African geology to the end of 1920". Geological Survey Memoir (18). Pretoria.
- Plug, C. (1990). "Early scientific and professional societies in the Transvaal: Barberton 1887-1889" (PDF). South African Journal of Cultural History. 4 (3): 190–199.
- "Albert Halder death record". England & Wales deaths 1837-2007 Transcription – via Findmypast.
