= John Shuter =

English cricketer

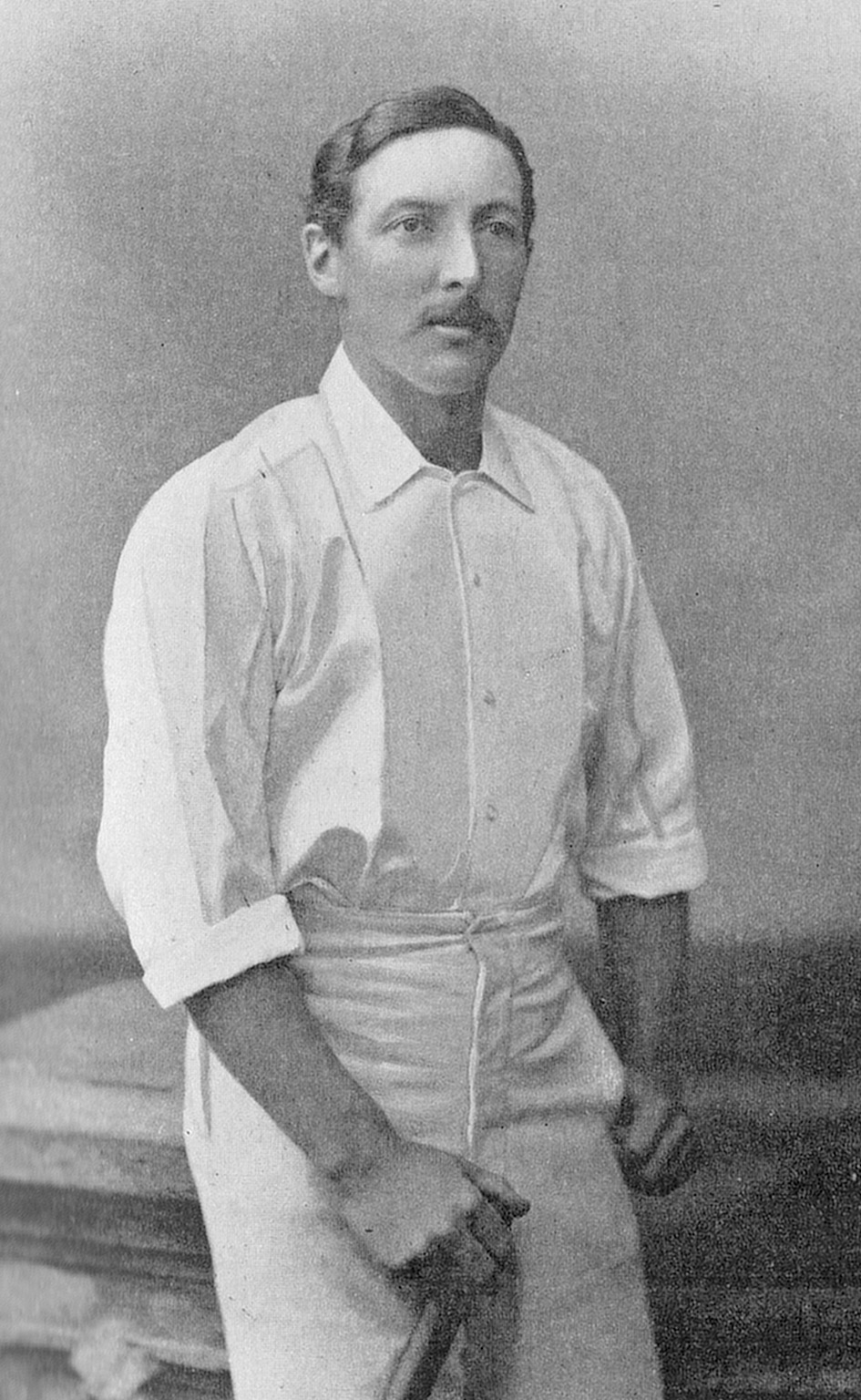

Cricket information
- Batting: Right-handed

International information
- National side: England
- Only Test: 13 August 1888 v Australia

Career statistics
Competition	Test	First-class
Matches	1	306
Runs scored	28	10,206
Batting average	28.00	21.26
100s/50s	0/0	8/49
Top score	28	135
Balls bowled	0	44
Wickets	0	0
Bowling average	–	–
5 wickets in innings	–	–
10 wickets in match	–	–
Best bowling	–	–
Catches/stumpings	0/–	157/–
- Source: CricInfo, 5 June 2020

John Shuter (9 February 1855 – 5 July 1920) was a cricketer who played for England and Surrey in the late 19th century. He is best remembered for captaining Surrey to a string of wins in the County Championship around the time it became official in 1890, aided by the bowler George Lohmann and back up by John Sharpe and William Lockwood. Shuter first led Surrey to the County Championship in 1887. They then came first in 1888, tied with Lancashire and Nottinghamshire in 1889, and won again in 1890, 1891 and 1892. Shuter was a batsman and chiefly an off-side player.

Shuter was born in Thornton Heath, Surrey, England, the son of Leonard Shuter, a stave timber merchant, and Caroline. John went to Winchester College, playing in its cricket eleven from 1871 to 1873. Though a Surrey man by birth, Shuter had played much club cricket in Bexley and was thus qualified by residence for Kent. After a single match in 1874, Shuter was rejected by Kent. He first played for his native county in 1877 and the following year jumped abruptly to the front rank of batsmen. He scored a century (then an exceptional feat due to the primitive pitches) against Sussex at Hove the following year and in 1880 became captain of Surrey.

At first, rewards for this move were slow and Surrey entered a crisis around 1883 – by which time Shuter had become established as one of the best batsmen in England despite a number of failures for the Gentlemen against the Players in the years since 1879. However, after overcoming the crisis Surrey rapidly developed into a top-flight county team through Lohmann's bowling, which headed the list of first-class wicket-takers for seven successive years from 1885 to 1891. Shuter had his best seasons in batting from 1882 to 1887, though he never reached 1,000 runs in a season. He played one Test on his home ground in 1888, but by 1890, with only one score of over fifty, it was clear his best days as a batsman were over. He continued though, to play a major role as captain of Surrey until 1893, when owing to the failure of Abel and their other top batsmen, they declined from first to sixth among nine counties.

Shuter made no score above 44 that season and owing to business resigned the captaincy. His only subsequent first-class match was for Surrey against Oxford University in 1909 at the age of fifty-four – with a team including Bill Hitch, over thirty-one years younger.

Long after he retired he was appointed as a Test selector (for the triangular tournament held in 1912) and secretary of Surrey in 1919 – a role which he did not hold for long as a stroke caused his sudden death in 1920. Although most noted for his cricketing exploits, Shuter joined his father in business as a stave timber merchant and cooper. His nephew, Leonard Shuter, was also a first-class cricketer.

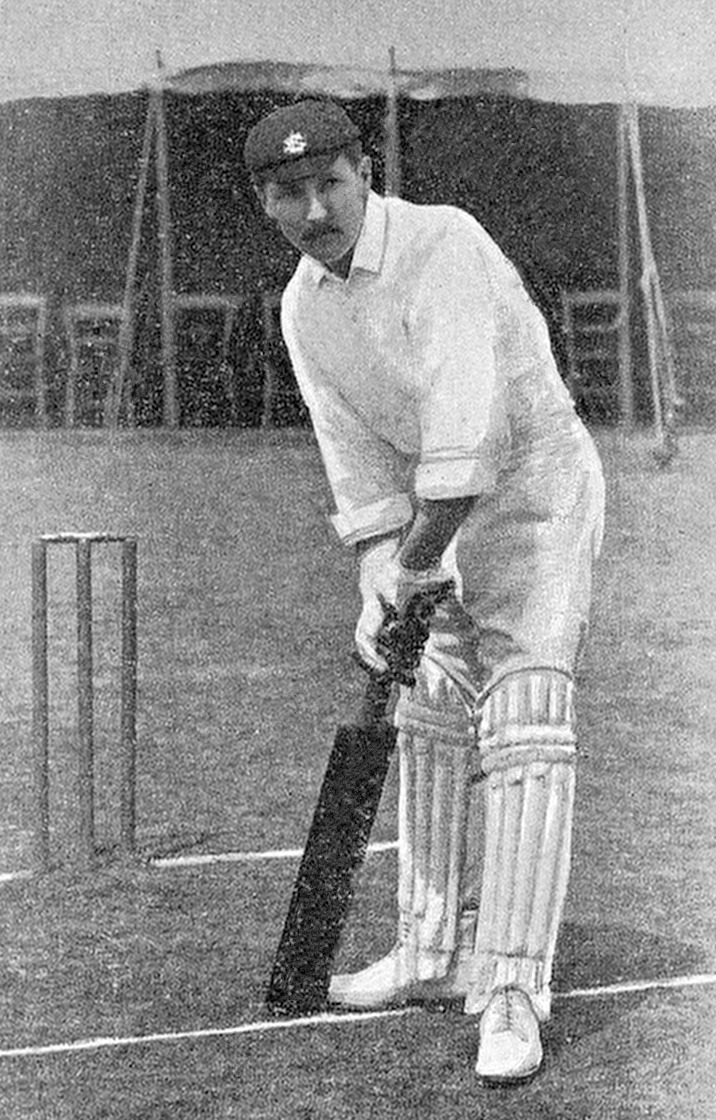
John Shuter

== Bibliography ==
- Carlaw, Derek (2020). Kent County Cricketers, A to Z: Part One (1806–1914) (PDF). Cardiff: ACS.
