= Hohentengen =

- Municipality
- Coat of arms

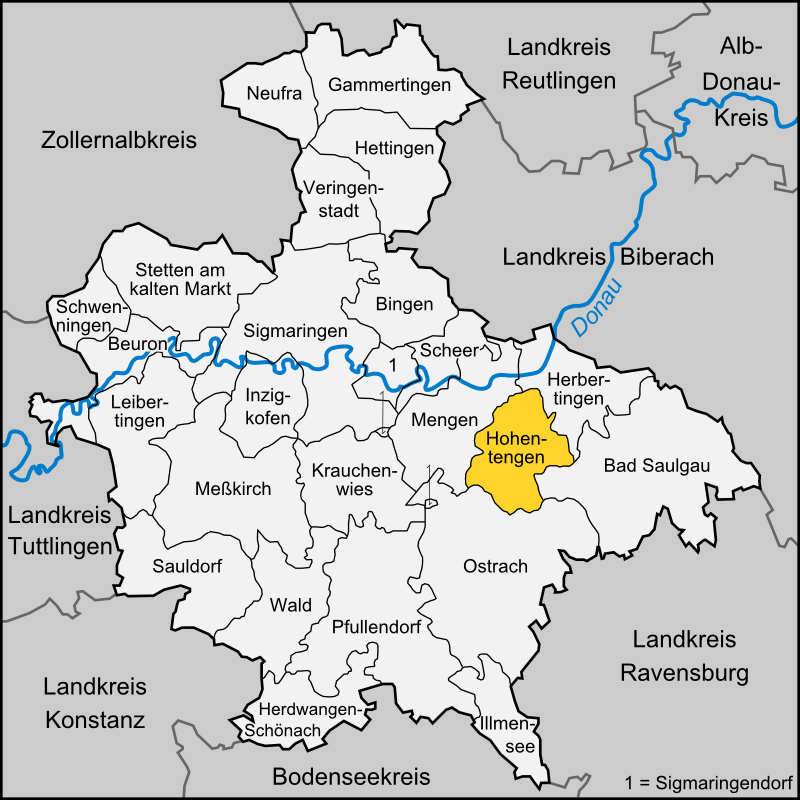
- Location of Hohentengen within Sigmaringen district
- Interactive map of Hohentengen
- Location within Germany Location within Baden-Württemberg
- Coordinates: 48°2′N 9°23′E
- Country: Germany
- State: Baden-Württemberg
- Admin. region: Tübingen
- District: Sigmaringen
- Subdivisions: 8

Government
  - Mayor (2016–24): Peter Rainer

Area
  - Total: 36.56 km^{2} (14.12 sq mi)
- Elevation: 594 m (1,949 ft)

Population (2025-12-31)
  - Total: 4,151
  - Density: 113.5/km^{2} (294.1/sq mi)
- Time zone: UTC+01:00 (CET)
  - Summer (DST): UTC+02:00 (CEST)
- Postal codes: 88367
- Dialling codes: 07572
- Vehicle registration: SIG
- Website: www.hohentengen-online.de

Hohentengen is a municipality in the district of Sigmaringen in Baden-Württemberg in Germany.

Coat of arms	District	Inhabitants	Size
Hohentengen	Hohentengen and Beizkofen	2266	694 ha (1,710 acres)
Kein Wappen Verfügbar	Bremen	285	260 ha (640 acres)
Eichen	Eichen	176	304 ha (750 acres)
Kein Wappen Verfügbar	Enzkofen	221	185 ha (460 acres)
Kein Wappen Verfügbar	Günzkofen	258	335 ha (830 acres)
Kein Wappen Verfügbar	Ölkofen	501	607 ha (1,500 acres)
Kein Wappen Verfügbar	Ursendorf	351	661 ha (1,630 acres)
Kein Wappen Verfügbar	Völlkofen	426	611 ha (1,510 acres)
