= Leonard Shuter (cricketer, born 1887) =

English cricketer (1887–1960)

Personal information
- Full name: Leonard Robert Warner Allen Shuter
- Born: 21 March 1887; Horton Kirby, Kent, England
- Died: 21 November 1960 (aged 73); Aldeburgh, Suffolk, England
- Batting: Unknown
- Relatives: Leonard Shuter (father); John Shuter (uncle)

Domestic team information
- Years: Team
- 1908: Marylebone Cricket Club

Career statistics
Competition	First-class
Matches	1
Runs scored	15
Batting average	7.50
100s/50s	–/–
Top score	11
Catches/stumpings	–/–
- Source: Cricinfo, 6 October 2021

Leonard Robert Warner Allen Shuter (21 March 1887 — 21 November 1960) was an English first-class cricketer.

The son of the cricketer Leonard Shuter, he was born in March 1887 at Horton Kirby, Kent. He was educated at Tonbridge School, before going up to Pembroke College, Cambridge. Shuter played first-class cricket for the Marylebone Cricket Club (MCC) against Hampshire at Lord's in 1908. Batting twice in the match as an opening batsman, he was dismissed for 4 runs by Francis Wyatt in the MCC first innings, while in their second innings he was dismissed for 11 runs by Charlie Llewellyn. A private in the Inns of Court Officers' Training Corps, Shuter was commissioned as a second lieutenant in the Kent Fortress Royal Engineers, serving with the unit in the First World War. During the war, he gained the temporary rank of lieutenant in May 1915 and the temporary rank of captain in July 1916. He gained the full rank of lieutenant in July 1917, while retaining his temporary rank of captain, before obtaining the full rank of captain following the war in November 1920. He married Alice Margaret Alexandra at Bath in November 1916, with the couple living in Ipswich where Shuter was employed until his retirement in 1932 by Alexanders Discount Co. Ltd. He died at in November 1960 at Aldeburgh, Suffolk. His uncle was the Test cricketer John Shuter.
