= Leonard Shuter (cricketer, born 1852) =

English cricketer

Leonard Allen Shuter (25 May 1852 – 13 July 1928) was an English first-class cricketer active 1876–83 who played for Surrey and Marylebone Cricket Club (MCC). He was born in Thornton Heath; died in Eastbourne. His son, also called Leonard, was a first-class cricketer.
