= Shuter House =

Coordinates: 29°35′55″S 30°23′05″E

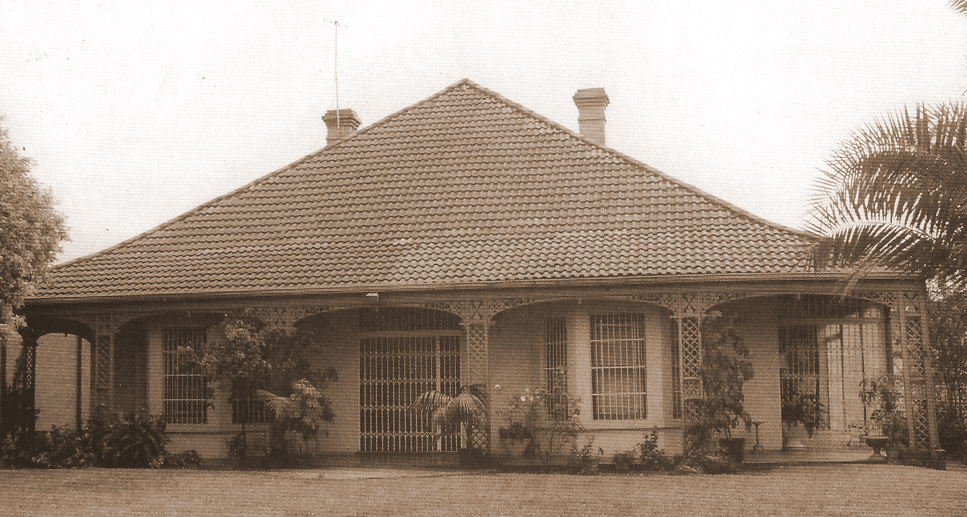
Shuter House in Pietermaritzburg

Shuter House is situated at 381 Langalibalele Street (Longmarket Street) in Pietermaritzburg, KwaZulu-Natal South Africa and designed by the well-known architect Phillip Dudgeon who also designed The Old Durban Town Hall.

The building was declared a National Monument (now known as a heritage landmark) on 16 September 1988

Shuter House is a single-story building with a pyramid roof. It has a verandah along three sides and plastered brick walls with a simulated stone course and ornate timber columns.
